= List of people from Guntur =

The article lists people of importance from (or related to) the city of Guntur of the Indian state of Andhra Pradesh.

== Film industry ==
- Brahmanandam - actor
- Chakravarthy - music composer
- Dhulipala - motion pictures
- Gummadi - actor
- Krish Jagarlamudi - director
- Krishna - owner of Padmalaya Studios
- Jamuna - actress
- S. Janaki - singer
- Mano - singer
- Mukkamala - motion pictures
- Posani Krishna Murali - writer, actor
- K. S. Ravindra - director
- Savithri - actress
- Murali Sharma - actor
- Koratala Siva - director
- Boyapati Srinu - director
- Sunitha - singer
- K. Viswanath - director, actor

== Entrepreneurs and philanthropists ==
- Velagapudi Ramakrishna - KCP Cements
- Kallam Anji Reddy - founder chairman, Dr Reddy Labs
- Maddi Sudarsanam - freedom fighter, philanthropist, politician and industrialist
- Konda Venkatappayya - freedom fighter, philanthropist

== Politics ==
=== Chief ministers ===
- Tanguturi Prakasam - former Chief Minister Andhra Pradesh
- Bhavanam Venkatarami Reddy - former Chief Minister Andhra Pradesh
- Kasu Brahmananda Reddy - former Chief Minister Andhra Pradesh
- Konijeti Rosaiah - former Chief Minister Andhra Pradesh

=== Central ministers ===
- Kotha Raghuramaiah - former Central minister
- Ummareddy Venkateswarlu - former Central minister
- Chandra Sekhar Pemmasani - Union minister of state for rural development and communications

=== Ministers ===
- Kanna Lakshminarayana

=== Assembly Speakers ===
- Nadendla Manohar - former Assembly speaker Andhra Pradesh
- Alapati Dharma Rao - former Assembly speaker Andhra Pradesh
- Kona Prabhakara Rao - former Assembly speaker Andhra Pradesh

=== Home Ministers ===
- Alapati Dharma Rao - former Home minister Andhra Pradesh
- Kodela Siva Prasada Rao - former Home minister Andhra Pradesh

=== Members of Parliament ===
- S. M. Laljan Basha - former Member of parliament, Loksabha and Rajyasabha
- S. V. L. Narasimham - trade union activist, first MP of Guntur City

== Others ==
- Ambati Rayudu - cricketer
- Ravi Vadlamani - chartered accountant
