= Burripalem =

- Neighborhood
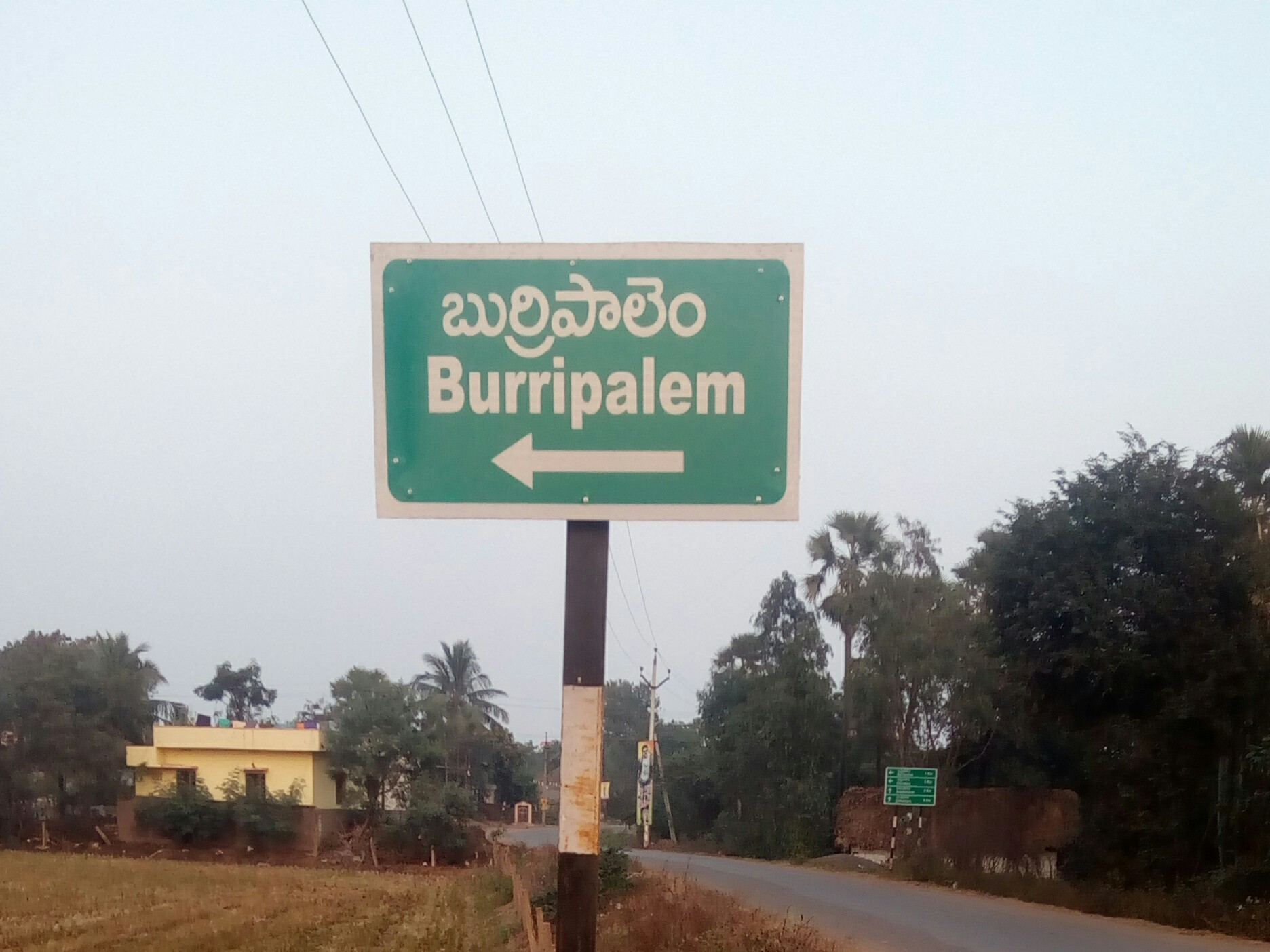
- Burripalem signboard
- Interactive map of Burripalem
- Location in Andhra Pradesh, India Burripalem (India)
- Coordinates: 16°14′50″N 80°42′11″E
- Country: India
- State: Andhra Pradesh
- District: Guntur
- Seat: Burripalem Gram Panchayat
- Wards: 12

Government
  - Type: Panchayati raj
  - Body: Burripalem Gram Sabha
  - Sarpanch: Vacant

Area
  - Total: 7.02 km^{2} (2.71 sq mi)
- Elevation: 10 m (33 ft)

Population (2011)
  - Total: 3,306
  - Density: 471/km^{2} (1,220/sq mi)

Languages
  - Official: Telugu
- Time zone: UTC+5:30 (IST)
- PIN: 522 xxx
- Telephone code: 08644

Burripalem is a village in Guntur district of the Indian state of Andhra Pradesh. It is located in Tenali, Tenali mandal of Tenali revenue division. It forms a part of Andhra Pradesh Capital Region.

== Geography ==
Burripalem is situated to the east of Tenali, at 16.25°N 80.58°E.

== Demographics ==
As of 2011 census of India, Burripalem had a population of 3,306. The total population constitute, 1,639 males and 1,667 females —a sex ratio of 1017 females per 1000 males. 262 children are in the age group of 0–6 years, of which 145 are boys and 117 are girls. The average literacy rate stands at 73.75% with 2,245 literates, significantly higher than the state average of 67.41%.

== Government and politics ==
Burripalem gram panchayat is the local self-government of the village. There are 12 wards, each represented by an elected ward member. The sarpanch is elected indirectly by the ward members; the seat is presently held by Pemmasani Purushotama Rao. The village is administered by the Tenali Mandal Parisha at the intermediate level of panchayat raj institutions.

== Transport ==
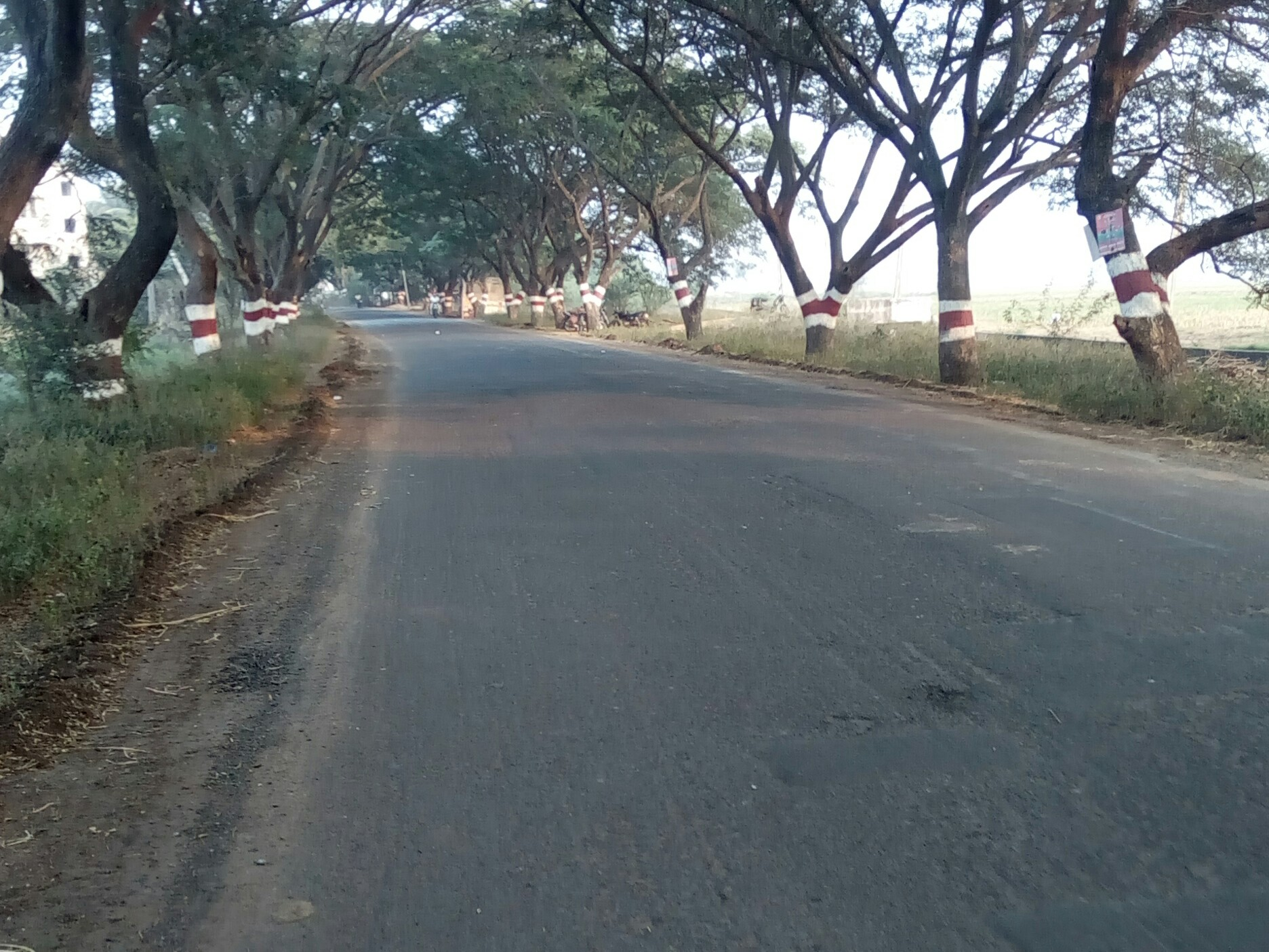
Tenali-Burripalem Road

The village has road connectivity to Tenali by the Tenali–Burripalem road.

This village was adopted by actor Mahesh Babu after his film Srimanthudu portrayed the concept of adoption of villages.

The village is 10 km from Tenali railway station.

== Notable people ==
Chandra Sekhar Pemmasani, Minister of State for Rural Development and Communications, Member of Parliament for Guntur, Founder and CEO of UWorld (USMLEWorld LLC)

Krishna, a Tollywood actor and ex-member of Indian Parliament who hails from Burripalem, and his son Mahesh Babu, also a Tollywood actor, adopted this village in 2015. They aim to provide clean drinking water, drainage and surfaced roads.

== Education ==
The primary and secondary school education are imparted by government, aided and private schools, under the School Education Department of the state. The total number of students enrolled in primary, upper primary and high schools of the village is 236.

Zilla Parishad High School is a Zilla Parishad funded school, which provides secondary education in the village.

== See also ==
- Villages in Tenali mandal
