= Timeline of Guntur =

This gives a timeline of major and important events that took place in the Guntur region of India.

In India history has been kept for thousands of years mainly through the culture, traditions, the science of Vedas and Puranas. The traditional time scale is clearly defined in Yugas cycles. The two epic events listed below are based on the traditional time scale. The Guntur district is home to the oldest evidence of humans in India, in the form of old Stone Age implements.

== Epic events ==
- Last Treta Yuga, (Traditional time scale)
  - The Ramayana took place in this yuga. Lord Rama, Sita and Lakshmana visited this part of India, now called Sitanagaram in the current Guntur district.
- Last Dvapara Yuga, (Traditional time scale)
  - The Mahabharata took place in this yuga. During their agyatavasa, Pandavas visited the area near Guttikonda and Undavalli caves of Guntur Region.

== Until 1600AD ==
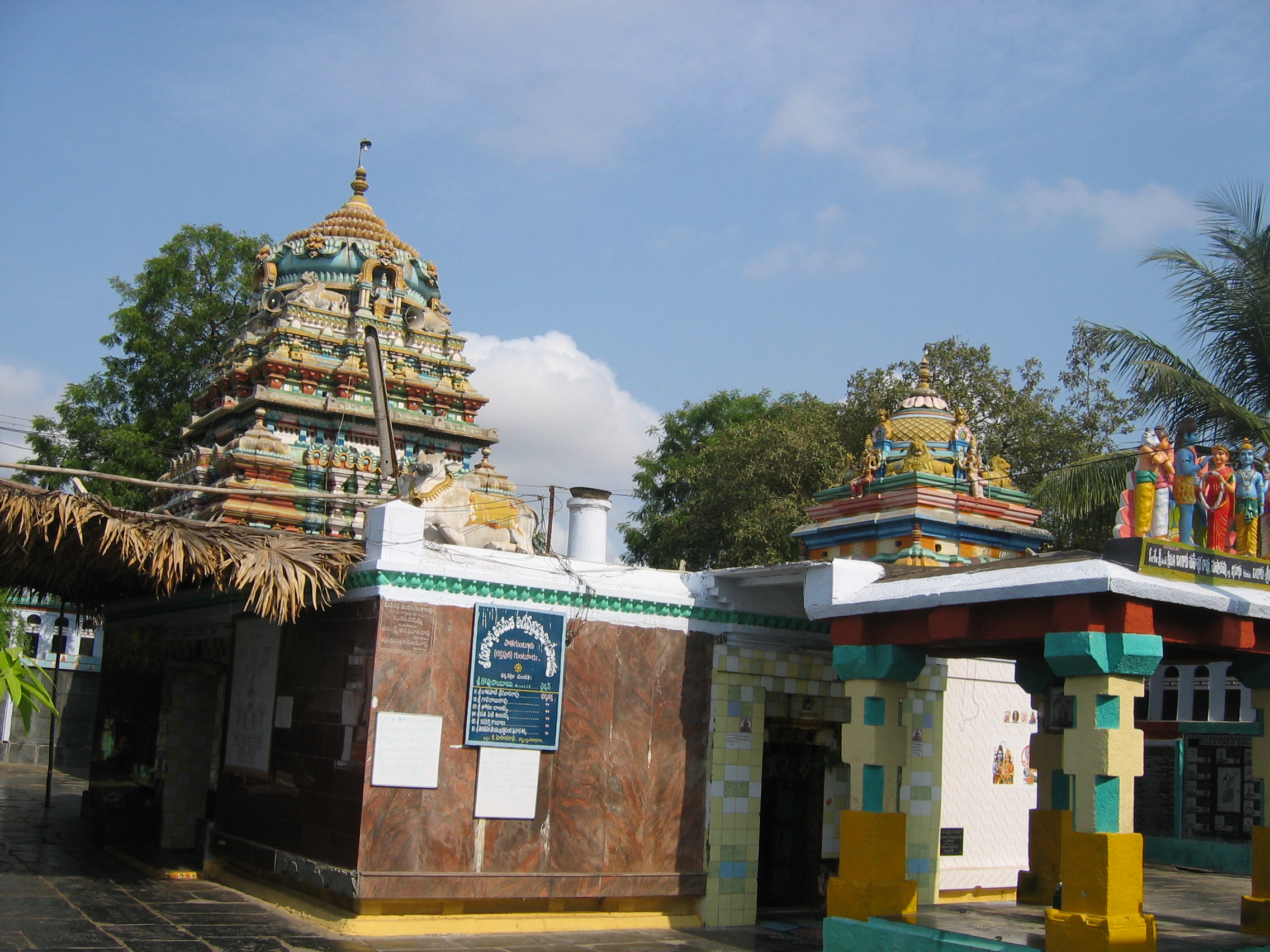
An old temple at Garthapuri

- 500 BCE – The Kingdom of Prati Palapura (currently Bhattiprolu), appears to be the earliest known kingdom in Guntur District.
- 230BCE – Inscriptional evidence shows that king Kubera was ruling over Bhattiprolu, followed by the Sala Kings
- 200 BCE – The philosopher Acharya Nagarjuna lived in this area.
- c. 200BCE – Mica (Abhrakam in Telugu/Sanskrit) was first discovered in the Guntur region, believed to be by the Great Philosopher Acharya Nagarjuna.
- Till & 900AD – Guntur region was successively ruled by dynasties such as the Satavahanas, Andhra-Ikshvakus, Pallavas, Ananda Gotrikas, Vishnukundina, Kota Vamsa, Chalukyas.
- 900 AD – Ammaraja I (922–929), the Vengi Chalukyan King had ruled the region. It was referred to as Garthapuri.
- 1180 AD – "Andhra Kurukshetra" took place, famous battle of Pallava Nadu which is enshrined in legend and literature.
- 1300 AD – Guntur was mentioned as the native place of his forefathers by the famous poet Sri Thikkana Somayaji who co-authored the Telugu Mahabharatham.
- 1509 AD – The famous Tenali Ramalinga joined the club of Astadiggajas (Elite Team for Administration, Literature, Poetry) in the Vijayanagara empire.

== 17th century to present ==
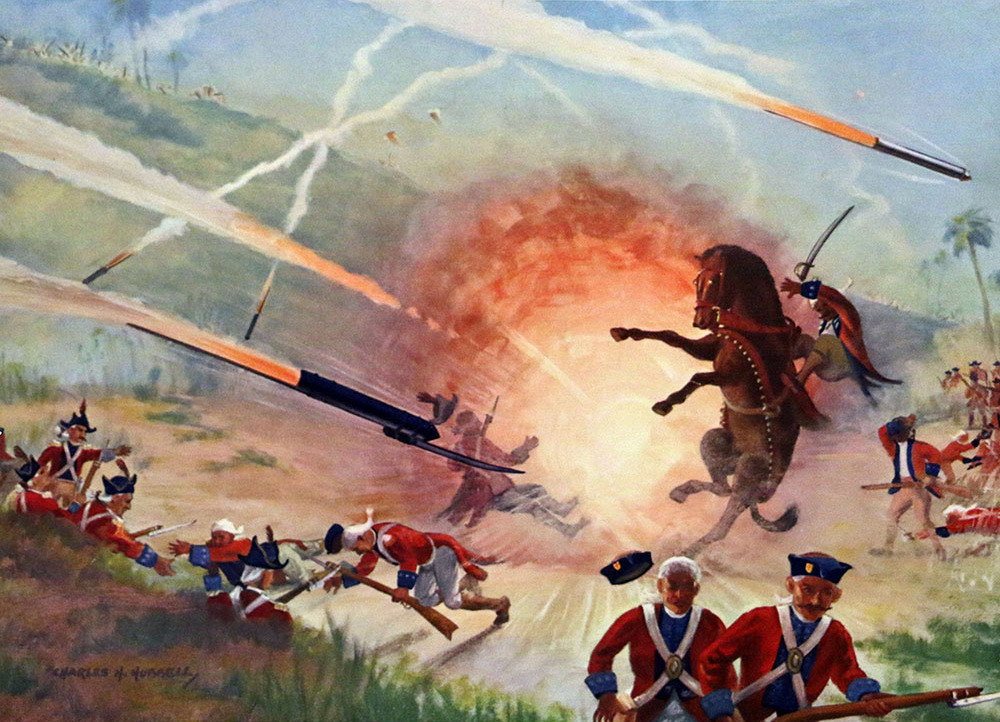
Battle of Guntur

- 1687 – Guntur became part of the Mughal empire when the emperor Aurangzeb conquered the Qutb Shahi sultanate of Golconda.
- 1750 – French occupied and took control of the region.
- 1780 – The Battle of Guntur, involving areas ranging from Mysore to Guntur, took place, where rockets were first used by Indian troops against the British Army.
- 1788 – Guntur was brought under control of the British East India Company, and became a district of Madras Presidency.
- 1868 – Helium was discovered in Guntur City by French astronomer Pierre Janssen during the 18 August solar eclipse.
- 1885 – A higher education institution was established at Guntur, called Andhra-Christian College (AC College).
- 1899 – On 6 April, Mahatma Gandhi held a public meeting at Guntur City on the India's independence movement, with local freedom fighters such as Pattabhi Sitaramayya and Konda Venkatappayya. They marched up to Bapatla.
- 1912 – A family from Guntur who are the only Indian Family, travelled in the Titanic on the way to United States and survived from the sinking accident.
- 1922 – Civil disobedience movement (part of regaining India's independence) took place in Guntur City organised by Tanguturi Prakasam Pantulu with 30,000 volunteers.
- 1930 – Hindu High school was established in Guntur, later it became Guntur Hindu College.
- 1936 – India's first Central Tobacco Research Institute started in Guntur.
- 1946 – The city's first Medical College campus (Guntur Medical College) was established.
- 1947 – India regained independence from Britain.
- 1947 – under Pandit Jwharlal Nehru government elected Janab Galib Saheb as Guntur's first MP[Member of Parliament] directly from guntur
- 1952 – Guntur residents elected their MP, Sistla Narasimharao.
- 1953 – Guntur region played a major role in the formation of new Andhra Pradesh; T.Prakasam became the Head of the State.
- 1954 – The State High Court was established in Guntur on 5 July 1954.
- 1964 – ST.IGNATIUS EM HIGH SCHOOL AND ST.IGNATIUS GIRLS HIGH SCHOOL was established in guntur urban.
- Loyola Public School, one of the largest schools in Andhra Pradesh, was established in Nallapadu.
- 1967 – Andhra University Guntur Campus was established in Nallapadu.
- 1976 – Acharya Nagarjuna University was created, with the main campus on the east side of the city.
- 1985 – The city's first Engineering/Technology college campus (RVR & JC College of Engineering) opened.
- 1992 – Conjoined twins were successfully separated at Guntur General Hospital.
- 1995 – Guntur municipality became Municipal corporation of Guntur in August.
- 2003 – Guntur division became the region's Railway Divisional headquarters under Indian Railways.
- 2004 – To ease the traffic at Guntur station, New Guntur transit point started renaming old Reddipalem station as an alternate route and a by-pass to northern India.
- 2006 – On 4 October, a rare natural phenomenon occurred in Guntur when the sky over the city's skyline illuminated a pink-orange hue.
- 2009 – On 9 February, Vignan University has been established to become the first private university in the region.
- 2009 – On 3 September, K. Rosaiah of Guntur region became the CM of AP after the death of Rajasekhar Reddy.
- 2012 – On 12 July, ten nearby villages have been merged into the municipal corporation as part of city's expansion into 'greater' status, making the city 3rd largest in the state by area.
- 2014 – Guntur city became part of Andhra Pradesh Capital Region
