= Guntur district =

- District of Andhra Pradesh
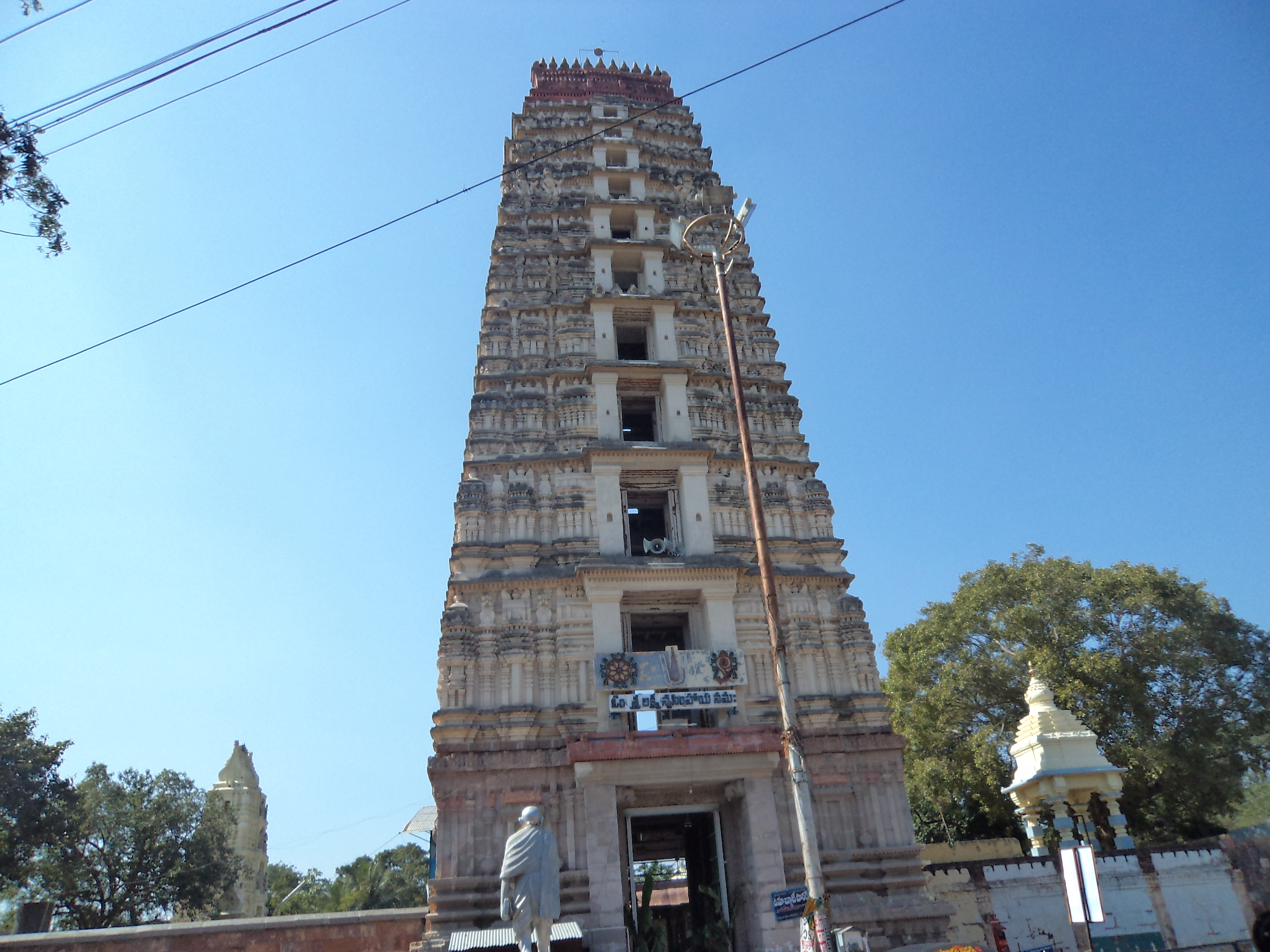
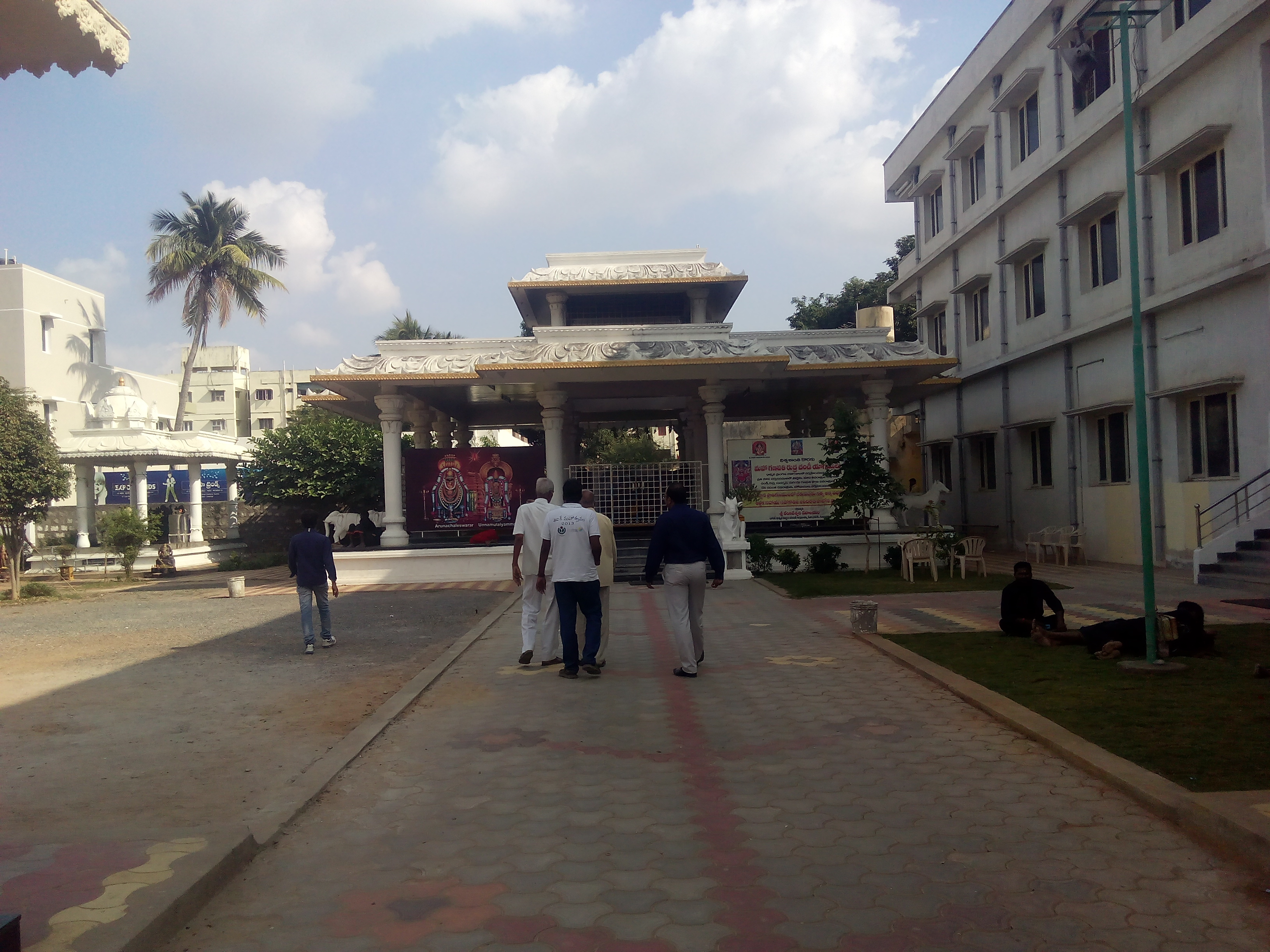
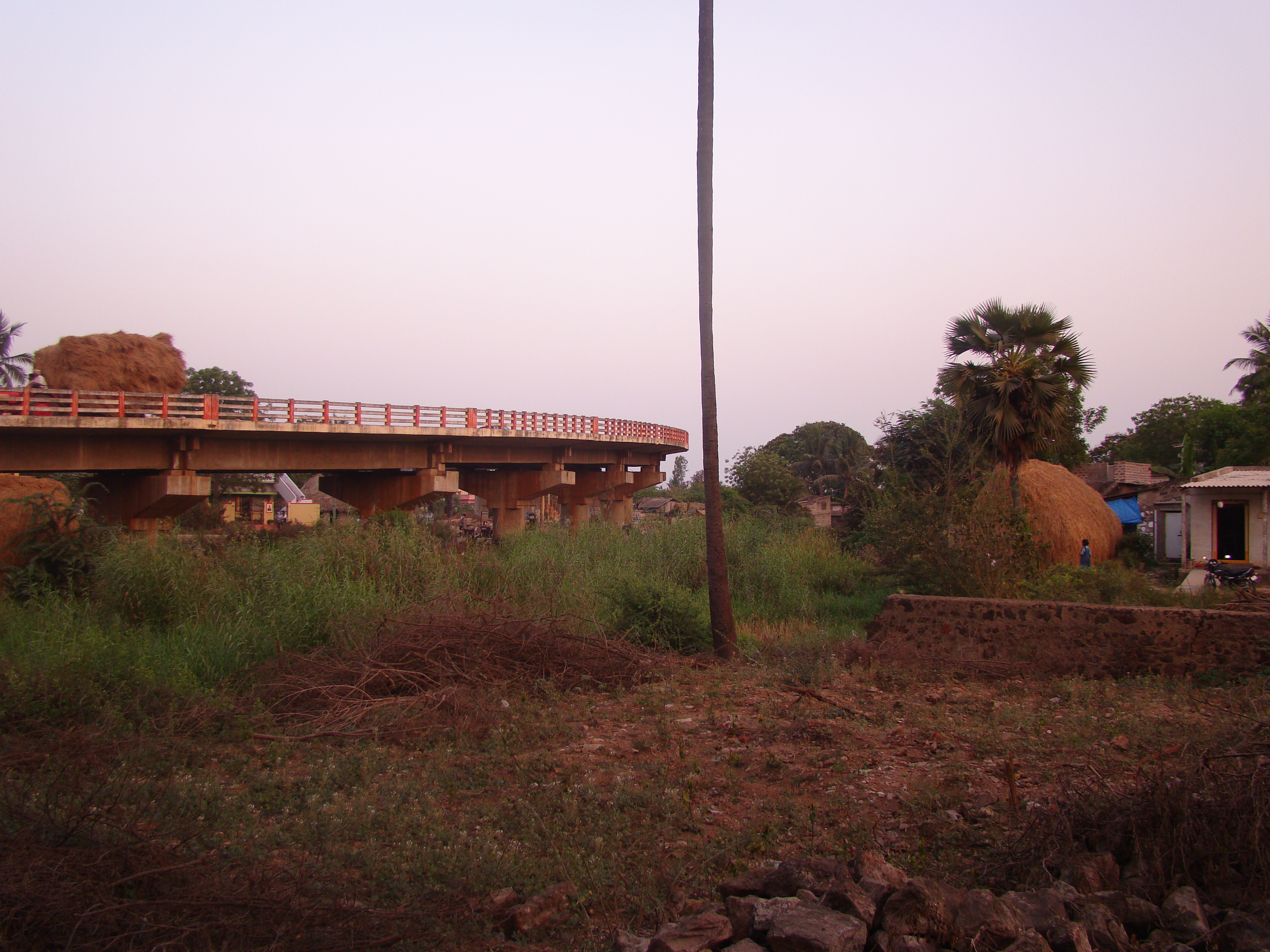
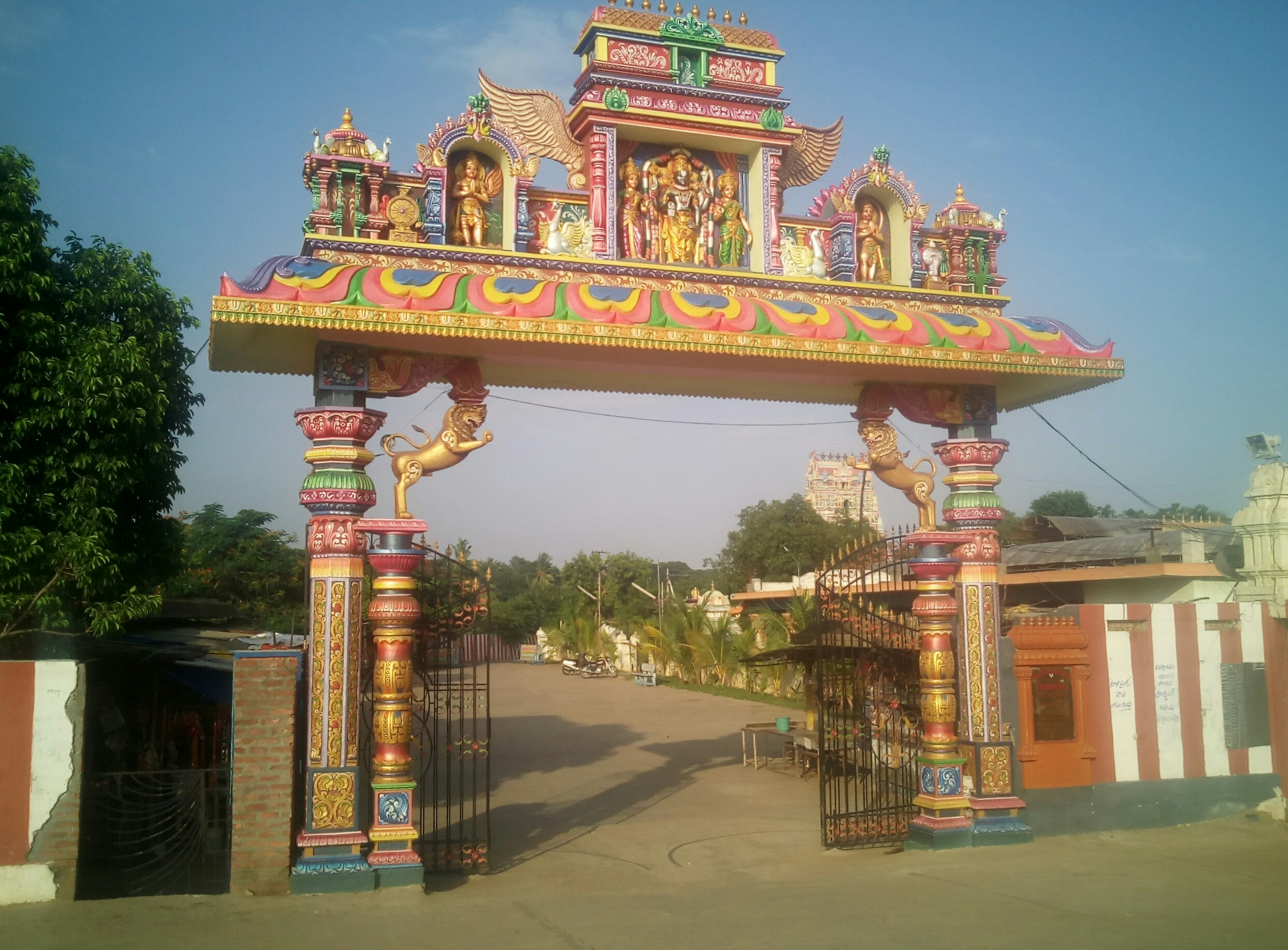
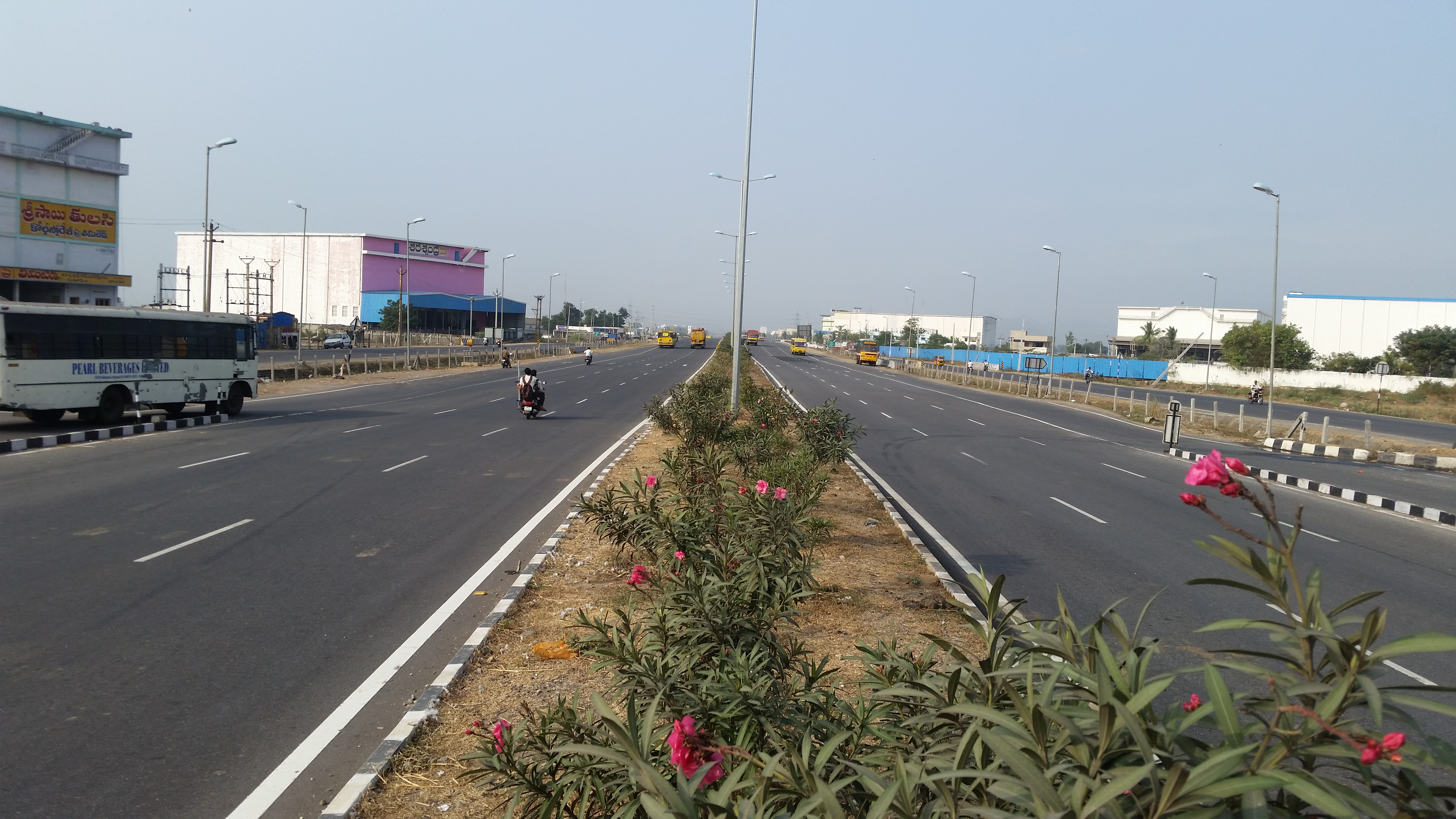
- Clockwise from top-left: Lakshmi Narasimha Temple in Mangalagiri, Annamayya Library, Vaikuntapuram temple in Tenali, Chuttugunta centre in Guntur, Flyover in Pedavadlapudi

- Location of Guntur district in Andhra Pradesh
- Interactive map of Guntur district
- Coordinates (Guntur): 16°18′N 80°27′E
- Country: India
- State: Andhra Pradesh
- Region: Kosta Andhra
- Established: 1904
- Revised to form Prakasam: 1970
- Revised to form new districts: 4 April 2022
- Headquarters: Guntur
- Mandals: 18

Government
  - Collector & District Magistrate: C. M. Saikanth Varma, I.A.S.
  - Superintendent of Police: Vakul Jindal, I.P.S.
  - Lok Sabha constituency: Guntur
  - MP: Chandra Sekhar Pemmasani
  - Assembly constituencies: 07

Area
  - Total: 2,443 km^{2} (943 sq mi)
  - Urban: 130.3 km^{2} (50.3 sq mi)

Population (2011)
  - Total: 2,091,075
  - Density: 855.9/km^{2} (2,217/sq mi)
  - Urban: 1,012,331

Demographics
  - Literacy: 67.40%
  - Sex ratio: 1003
- Time zone: UTC+5:30 (IST)
- Vehicle registration: AP-07 (former); AP39 (from 30 January 2019)
- Major highways: NH-16
- District LGD code: 506
- District abbreviation: GNT
- Website: guntur.ap.gov.in

Guntur district is in the Kosta Andhra region of the Indian state of Andhra Pradesh. The administrative seat of the district is located at Guntur, one of the major urban centres of the state. Historically significant, the region was part of ancient Buddhist and Satavahana-era settlements and later came under various South Indian dynasties before British rule. The district is known for its agricultural prominence, particularly chilli and cotton cultivation, as well as education and trade. It forms part of the larger Coastal Andhra region and contributes significantly to the state’s economy and cultural heritage.

== Etymology ==
The district is named after city Guntur. In Sanskrit documents, Guntur was referred to as Garthapuri; in Telugu, "Guntlapuri" means "a place surrounded by water ponds". The settlement might have been near a pond (Telugu: "gunta"); hence "gunta uru" means "pond village". Another source refers to "kunta", a land-measuring unit, which may have transformed to "kunta uru" and later to "Guntur".

== History ==
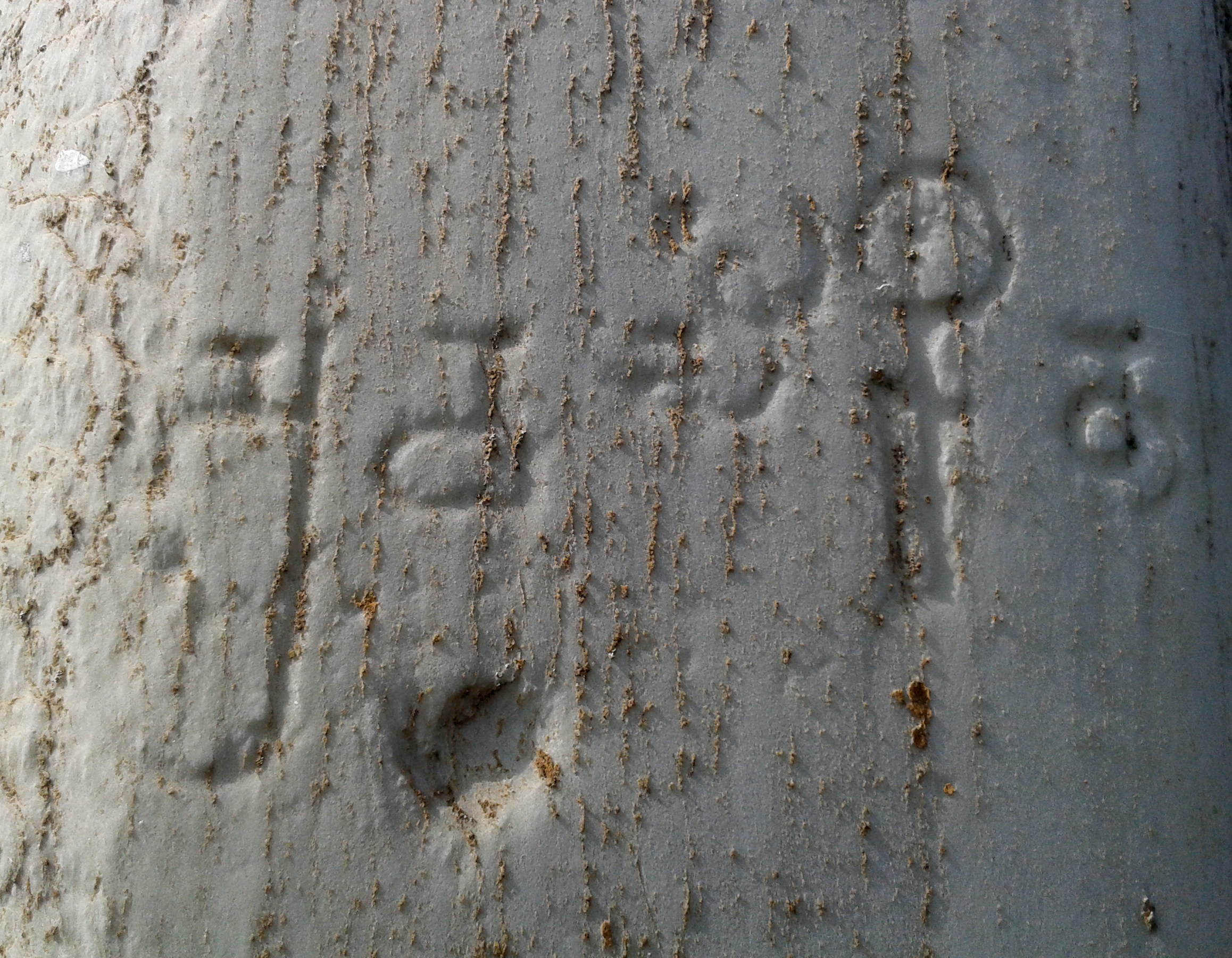
Brahmi Script inscribed on a Railing Pillar at Velpuru

Historical population
| Year | Pop. | ±% p.a. |
|---|---|---|
| 1901 | 1,133,968 | — |
| 1911 | 1,299,257 | +1.37% |
| 1921 | 1,385,050 | +0.64% |
| 1931 | 1,563,095 | +1.22% |
| 1941 | 1,755,986 | +1.17% |
| 1951 | 1,975,395 | +1.18% |
| 1961 | 2,327,246 | +1.65% |
| 1971 | 2,844,488 | +2.03% |
| 1981 | 3,434,724 | +1.90% |
| 1991 | 4,106,999 | +1.80% |
| 2001 | 4,465,144 | +0.84% |
| 2011 | 4,887,813 | +0.91% |

Guntur district is home to the second oldest evidence of human habitation in India, in the form of Palaeolithic (old Stone Age) implements. The place of Sitanagaram part of Guntur and the Guthikonda Caves can be traced (through Vedic Puranas) back to the traditional timescale Treta Yuga and Dvapara Yuga.

Since the beginning of Buddhist time, Guntur stood in the forefront in matters of culture, education and civilisation. Gautama Buddha preached at Dharanikota/Dhanyakatakam near Guntur and conducted Kalachakra ceremony, which takes its antiquity to 500 BCE. Taranatha, a Buddhist monk writes: "On the full moon of the month Chaitra in the year following his enlightenment, at the great stupa of Dhanyakataka, the Buddha emanated the mandala of "The Glorious Lunar Mansions" (Kalachakra). Buddhists established universities in ancient times at Dhanyakataka and Amaravathi. Scores of Buddhist stupas were excavated in the villages of Guntur district. Acharya Nagarjuna, an influential Buddhist philosopher taught at Nagarjunakonda and is said to have discovered Mica in 200 BCE. Chinese traveller and Buddhist monk Hiuen Tsang (Xuanzang) visited Amaravati in 640 C.E., stayed for sometime and studied 'Abhidhammapitakam'. He observed that there were many Viharas and some of them were deserted, which points out that Hinduism was gaining ground at that time. Xuanzang wrote a glorious account of the place, Viharas and monasteries that existed.

The 'Agasthyeswara Sivalayam' is in the old city of Guntur. It has inscriptions on two stones in 'Naga Lipi' (ancient script). It is said that Agastya built the temple in the last Treta Yuga around the Swayambhu Linga and hence the name. The 'Nagas' were said to have ruled the region.

Ancient history can be traced from the time of Sala kings who ruled during the 5th century BCE. The earliest reference to Guntur, a variant of Guntur, comes from the Idern plates of Ammaraja I (922–929 CE), the Vengi Chalukyan King.

Guntur was successively ruled by famous dynasties such as the Satavahanas, Andhra Ikshvakus, Pallavas, Ananda Gotrikas, Vishnukundina, Kota Vamsa, Chalukyas, Cholas, Kakatiyas, Musunuris, Reddys, Vijayanagara and Qutb Shahis during ancient and medieval times. The famous battle of Palnadu which is enshrined in legend and literature as Palnati Yuddham was fought in Guntur district in 1180 CE.

=== Qutb Shahis, Nizams and later ===
During the 16th century Guntur became part of the Mughal Empire. In 1579 Khasa Rayarao, a Deshastha Brahmin who was the Commander-in-Chief of Ibrahim Quli Qutb Shah captured Kondaveedu Fort. After that, Khasa Rayarao was made the Governor of the Kondaveedu Sima (present Guntur district) by changing its name to Murtazanagar Sircar and kept the financial administration of this region in his hands. Khasa Rayarao appointed many Deshastha Brahmins, Kammas and some Golconda Vyaparis as Deshmukhs and Chowdarys. In 1687 CE when the emperor Aurangzeb conquered the Qutb Shahi sultanate of Golconda, of which Guntur was then a part. In 1724 CE, Asaf Jah, viceroy of the empire's southern provinces, declared his independence as the Nizam of Hyderabad. The coastal districts of Hyderabad, known as the Northern Circars, were occupied by the French in 1750. During this time, the Manur Rao family of Deshastha Brahmin community, the Vasireddi family of Kamma community and the Manik Rao family of Velama community were prominent Zamindar families in the present day Guntur district. The Manur Rao family were rulers of Chilakaluripet Zamindari and Sattenapalle Zamindari, The Vasireddi family were rulers of Amaravathi Zamindari and The Manik Rao family were the rulers of Repalle Zamindari.

=== Post Independence ===
The Guntur region played a significant role in the struggle for independence and the formation of Andhra Pradesh. The northern, Telugu- speaking districts of Madras State, including Guntur, advocated to become a separate state after independence. The new state of Andhra region named Andhra State, was created in 1953 from the eleven northern districts of Madras State.

In 1970, part of Guntur district was split off to become part of the Prakasam district. Guntur District had 8 Talukas in 1971, later in 1978 they were increased to 21 Talukas. In 1985, Mandal system was created and 57 mandals were formed in the district. In 2018, Guntur mandal is split into Guntur East and Guntur West mandals making a total of 58 mandals.

| S.No. | Talukas in 1971 | Talukas in 1978 | Mandals in 1985 |
|---|---|---|---|
| 1 | Guntur | Guntur | Guntur, Pedakakani, Chebrolu |
| 1 | Guntur | Prathipadu | Prathipadu, Vatticherukuru, Pedanandipadu |
| 1 | Guntur | Tadikonda | Tadikonda, Thullur, Amaravathi |
| 1 | Guntur | Mangalagiri | Mangalagiri, Tadepalli |
| 2 | Tenali | Tenali | Tenali, Tsundur, Vemuru, Chebrolu |
| 2 | Tenali | Emani | Duggirala, Kollipara |
| 2 | Tenali | Amruthalur | Amruthalur, Kolluru, Vemuru |
| 3 | Repalle | Repalle | Repalle, Bhattiprolu |
| 3 | Repalle | Pallapatla | Cherukupalli, Nagaram, Nizampatnam |
| 4 | Bapatla | Bapatla | Bapatla, Karlapalem, Pittalavanipalem |
| 4 | Bapatla | Ponnur | Ponnuru, Kakumanu |
| 5 | Narsaraopeta | Narsaraopeta | Narasaraopeta, Nakirekallu, Rompicherla |
| 5 | Narsaraopeta | Chilakaluripeta | Chilakaluripeta, Edlapadu, Nadendla, Pedanandipadu |
| 6 | Vinukonda | Vinukonda | Vinukonda, Nuzendla, Savalyapuram |
| 6 | Vinukonda | Ipur | Ipur, Bollapalle, Savalyapuram |
| 7 | Palnadu | Palnadu | Gurajala, Karempudi, Rentachintala |
| 7 | Palnadu | Macherla | Macherla, Durgi, Veldurthy, Rentachintala |
| 7 | Palnadu | Piduguralla | Piduguralla, Dachepalle, Machavaram |
| 8 | Sattenapalle | Sattenapalle | Sattenapalle, Phirangipuram, Medikonduru |
| 8 | Sattenapalle | Rajupalem | Rajupalem, Bellamkonda, Muppala, Krosuru |
| 8 | Sattenapalle | Talluru | Atchampet, Pedakurapadu, Amaravathi, Krosuru |

The district was often referred to as the Land of Chillies. It was also a major centre for agriculture, education and learning. It exported large quantities of chillies and tobacco. It suffered from Naxalite insurgency and is a part of the Red corridor.

Based on census of India, the district before reorganisation in 2022 had a population of 4,887,813 with a density of 193 inhabitants per square kilometre (500/sq mi). The total population constitute, 2,440,521 males and 2,447,292 females – a sex ratio of 1003 females per 1000 males. The total urban population is 16,52,738 (33.81%). There are 29,60,441 literates with a literacy rate of 67.40%. On 4 April 2022, the district is divided again to form Palnadu and Bapatla districts.

== Geography ==
Guntur district occupies an area of approximately 2,443 square kilometres (943 sq mi), The Krishna River forms the northeastern and eastern boundary of the district, separating it from Krishna district.It is bounded on the south by Bapatla district and on the west by Palnadu district. It has an area of 2,443 km^{2} (943 mi^{2}).

== Demographics ==
Religions in Guntur district as of 4 April 2022 and based on 2011 census data (Note: As christians record their religion as 'Hindu' on the census, the hinduism may numbers are larger)
| Religion | Percent |
| Hinduism | 83.94% |
| Islam | 13.37% |
| Christianity | 2.21% |
| Other or not stated | 0.48% |
Distribution of religions

After bifurcation the district on 4th April 2022, based on the 2011 census data, the district had a population of 20,91,075, of which 1,072,544 (51.29%) lived in urban areas. Guntur district had a sex ratio of 1007 females to 1000 males. Scheduled Castes and Scheduled Tribes make up 4,21,861 (20.17%) and 69,017 (3.30%) of the population respectively.} 86.14% of the population spoke Telugu and 12.32% Urdu as their first language.

Languages of Guntur district as of 4 April 2022 based on 2011 census
1. Telugu (86.1%)
2. Urdu (12.3%)
3. Others (1.54%)

== Administrative divisions ==
The district is divided into two Revenue divisions, namely, Guntur and Tenali. These are sub-divided into 18 mandals, 712 villages and 4 cities/towns. Guntur and Mangalagiri Tadepalli Municipal Corporation are two municipal corporations, while Tenali, and Ponnur are municipalities.

=== Mandals ===
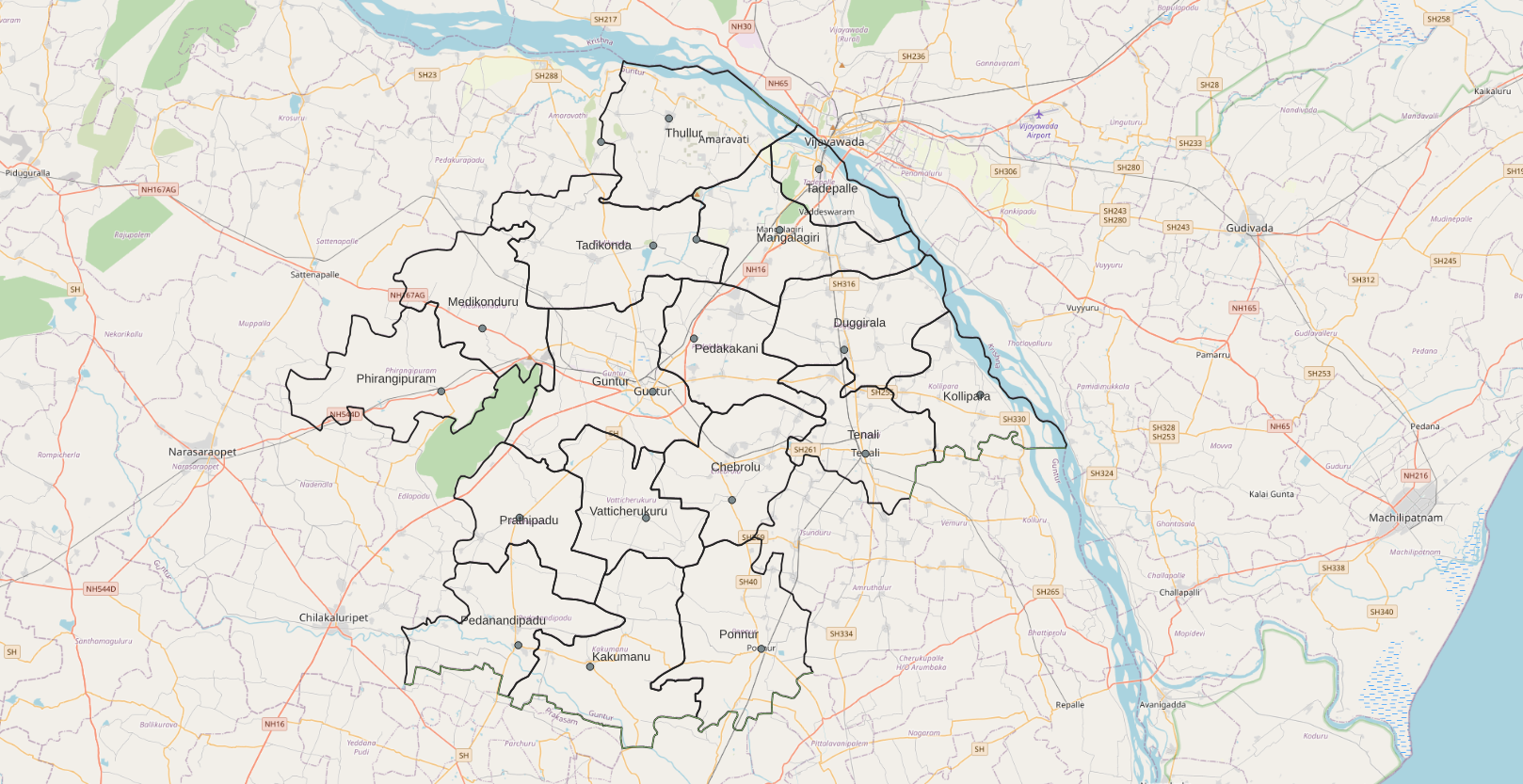
OpenStreetMap rendering of Guntur District Mandals

The below table categorises the 18 mandals into their respective revenue divisions in the district:

1. Guntur revenue division
  1. Guntur East
  2. Guntur West
  3. Medikonduru
  4. Pedakakani
  5. Pedanandipadu
  6. Phirangipuram
  7. Prathipadu
  8. Tadikonda
  9. Thullur
  10. Vatticherukuru
2. Tenali revenue division
  1. Chebrolu
  2. Duggirala
  3. Kakumanu
  4. Kollipara
  5. Mangalagiri
  6. Ponnur
  7. Tadepalle
  8. Tenali

=== Cities and towns ===
Municipal Bodies in Guntur District
| S.No. | City / Town, (city administration) | Urban local body type | Formation Year | 2011 Census Population |
|---|---|---|---|---|
| 1 | Guntur (Municipal body) | Municipal Corporation | 1866 | 670,073 |
| 2 | Mangalagiri, Tadepalli (Municipal body) | Municipal Corporation | 2021 | 300,497 |
| 3 | Tenali (Municipal body) | Municipality Grade - Special | 1912 | 164,937 |
| 4 | Ponnur (Municipal body) | Municipality Grade - 2 | 1964 | 59,913 |

=== Village Panchayats ===
Guntur district has 1022 Gram Panchayats.

== Politics ==
=== Parliament segment ===
Guntur Lok Sabha constituency

=== Assembly segments ===
Guntur constituency presently comprises the following legislative assembly segments:

| Constituency number | Name | Reserved for (SC/ST/None) | Parliament |
|---|---|---|---|
| 86 | Tadikonda | SC | Guntur |
| 87 | Mangalagiri | None | Guntur |
| 88 | Ponnur | None | Guntur |
| 91 | Tenali | None | Guntur |
| 93 | Prathipadu | SC | Guntur |
| 94 | Guntur West | None | Guntur |
| 95 | Guntur East | None | Guntur |

== Economy ==
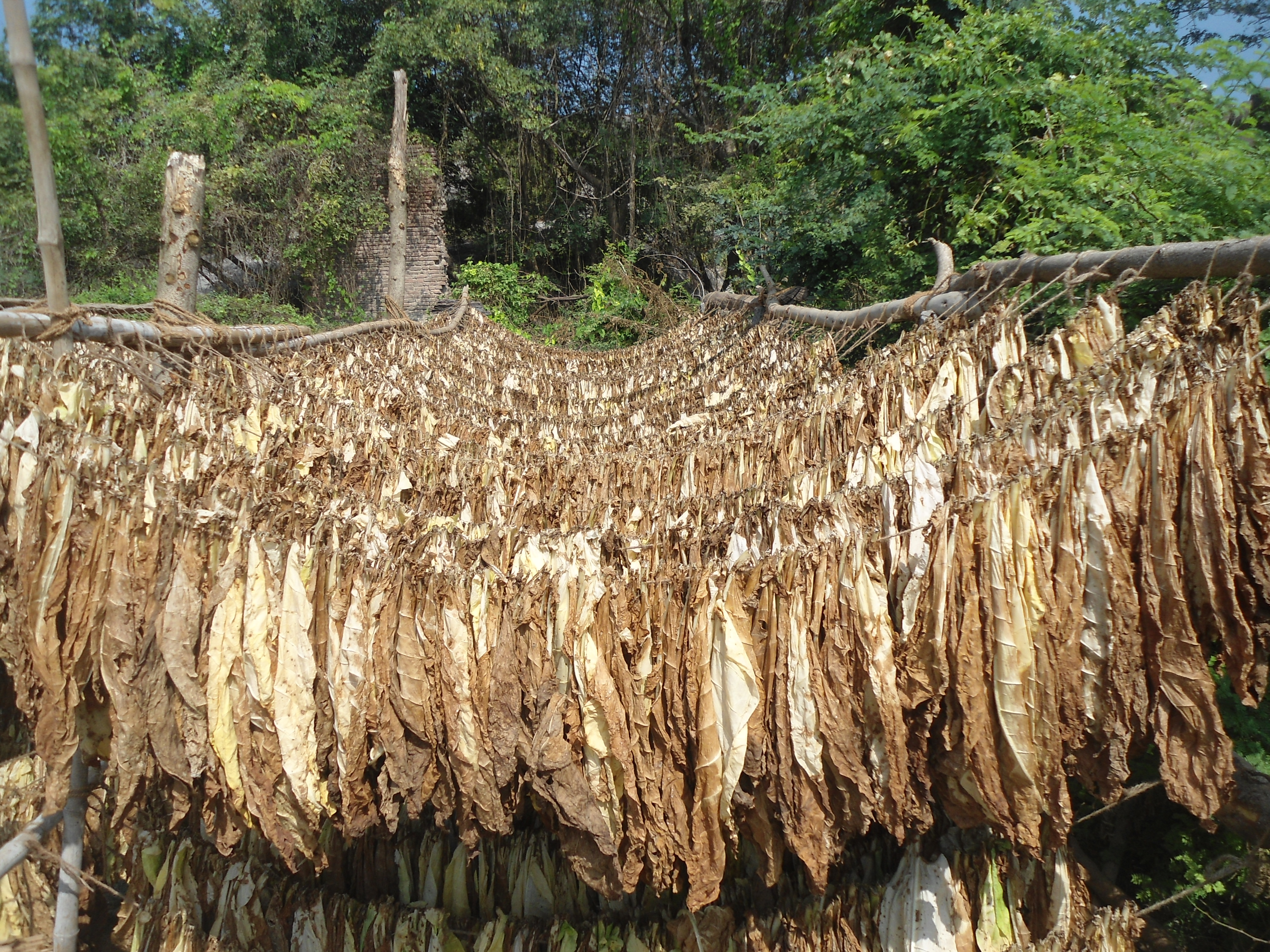
Tobacco Drying at Grandhasiri village in Guntur district

For the FY 2013–14, the Gross District Domestic Product (GDDP) of the district is ₹49,722 crore (US$5.3 billion) and it contributes 9.5% to the Gross State Domestic Product (GSDP). The per capita income at current prices was ₹82,026 (US$880). The primary, secondary and tertiary sectors of the district contribute ₹16,111 crore (US$1.7 billion), ₹8,770 crore (US$940 million) and ₹24,841 crore (US$2.7 billion) respectively to the GDDP.

The major products contributing to the GVA of the district from agriculture and allied services are paddy, cotton kapas, chillies, banana, milk, meat and fisheries. The GVA to the industrial and service sector is contributed from construction, electricity, manufacturing, transport and education.

== Transport ==
The total road length of state highways in the district is 1,258 km (782 mi). There exists 406 km (252 mi) of rail network in the district.

== Education and research ==
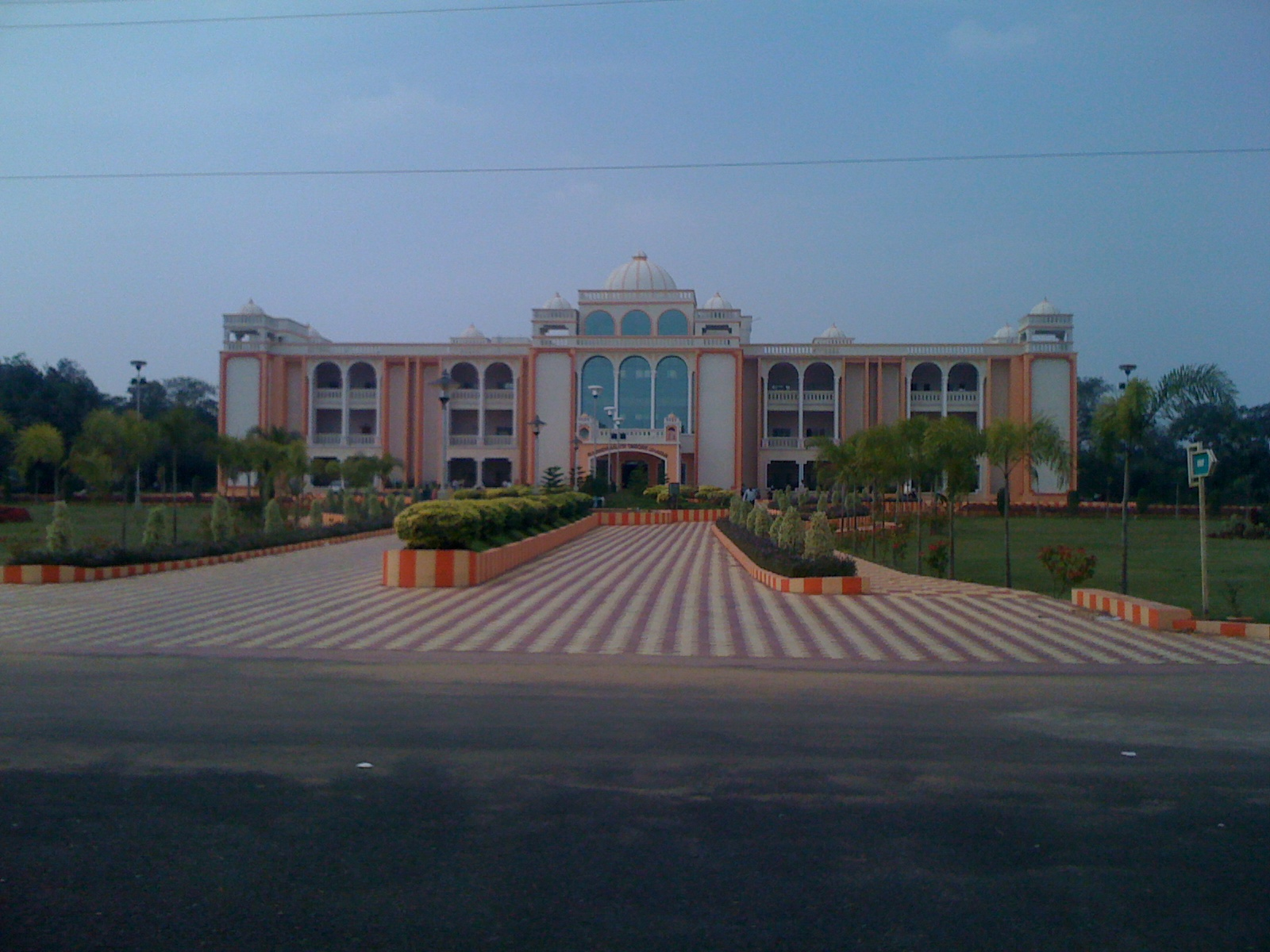
Nagarjuna university campus

The primary and secondary school education is imparted by government, aided and private schools, under the School Education Department of the state. As per the school information report for the academic year 2015–16, there are a total of 4,739 schools. They include, 32 government, 2,839 mandal and zilla parishads, 2 residential, 1329 private, 14 model, 24 Kasturba Gandhi Balika Vidyalaya (KGBV), 296 municipal and 203 other types of schools. The total number of students enrolled in primary, upper primary and high schools of the district are 637,031. The district being home to the capital city, it is experiencing a growth in private international schools as well. The Central Board of Secondary Education, Secondary School Certificate or the Indian Certificate of Secondary Education are the different types of syllabus followed by different schools. The medium of instruction followed by different schools are English, Telugu and Urdu.

There are several junior colleges which are under government, residential, social welfare, disabled welfare, private aided and unaided for the purpose of imparting (10+2) education and the students sit for the certificate of Board of Intermediate Education. AC college is the oldest private aided college of the district, established in 1885. The higher education colleges have various fields of study like medical, nursing, degree, post graduate, polytechnic, law, teaching, pharmacy, engineering, veterinary etc. The Acharya Nagarjuna University is a state university which has fourteen autonomous colleges as per Universities Grant Commission. The KMC, GMC, AIIMS are some of the premier medical institutes in Guntur. There are also many private universities like Vignan University, KL University in the district. The Acharya N. G. Ranga Agricultural University at Lam is a public agricultural university, equipped with a Regional Agricultural Research Station.

== Culture ==
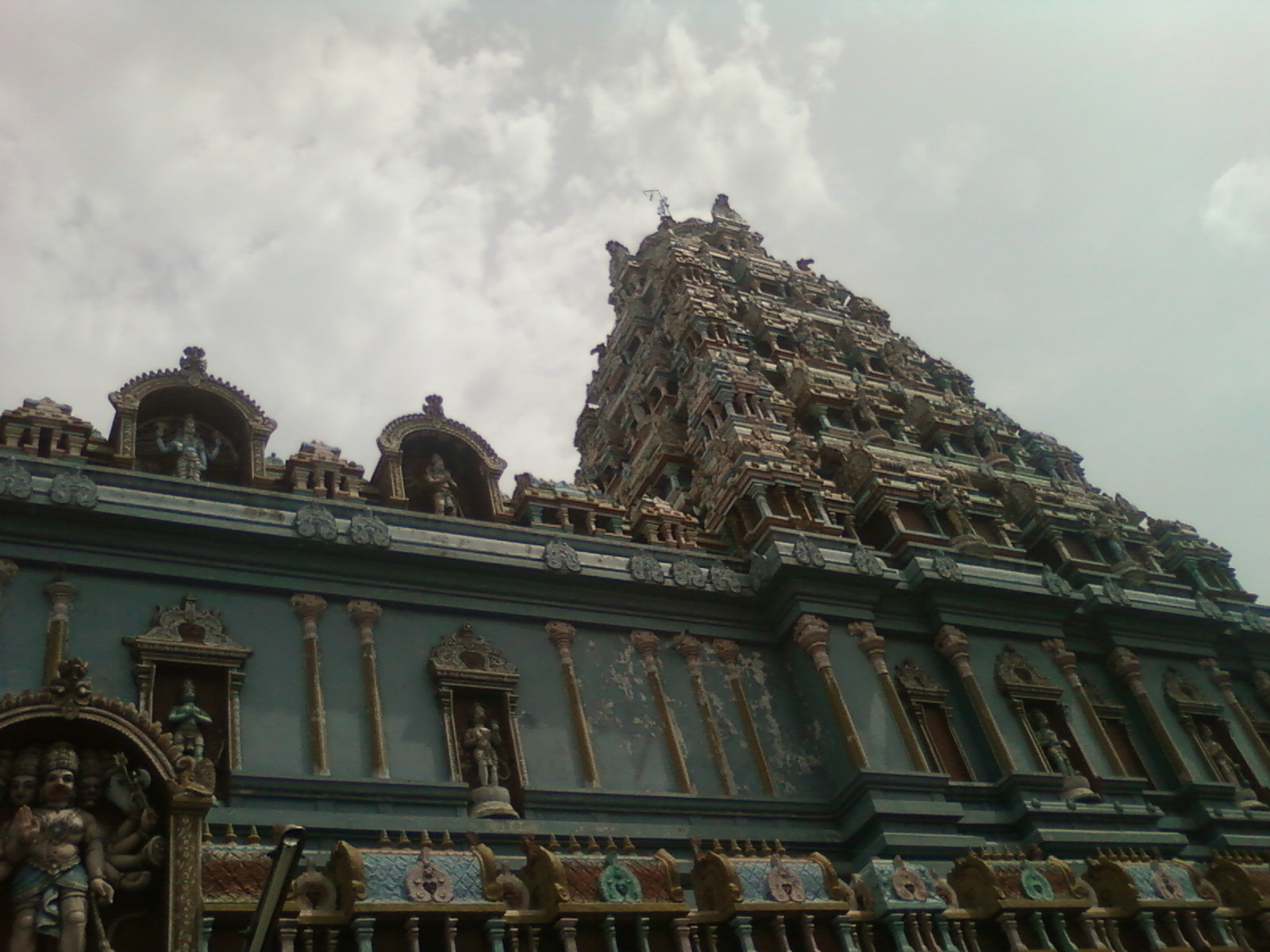
Lord Hanuman temple, Ponnur

The district has many festivals such as Rama Navami, Maha Sivaratri, Vinayaka Chavithi, Vijaya Dasami, Deepawali, Holi, Ugadi, Eid, Krishnastami, Christmas. There are hill temple festivals at Kotappakonda, Mangalagiri.

== Sports ==
Mangalagiri International Cricket Stadium is being built in a 20-acre (8.1 ha) site in Navuluru, village of Mangalagiri town, Guntur district, about 15 km from the city of Guntur. The exclusive stadium of the Andhra Cricket Association will be the venue for international and Ranji matches.

== Tourism ==
Places of historical importance in the district include Ponnur, Undavalli Caves, Gurazala, Mangalagiri, Tadepalle, Tenali and the archaeological museum in Guntur. There are many places of interest like Undavalli Caves.

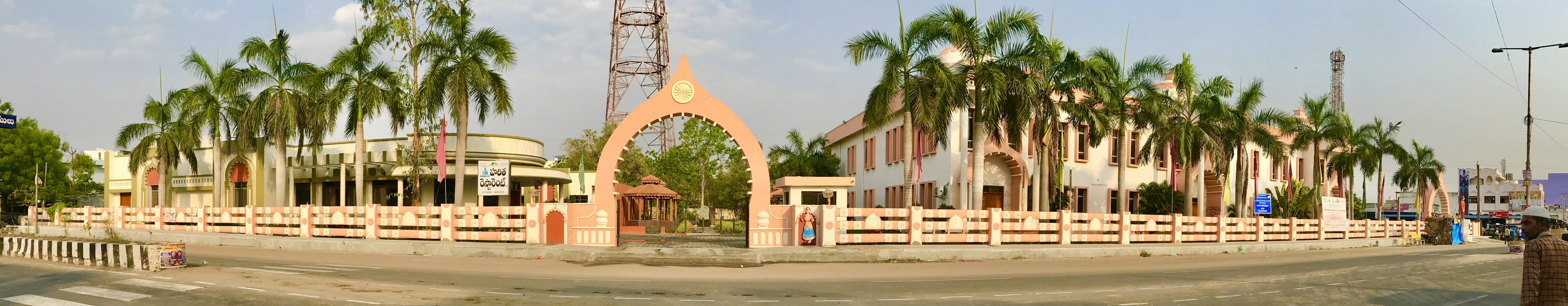
Amaravathi Cultural Heritage Museum

== Healthcare ==
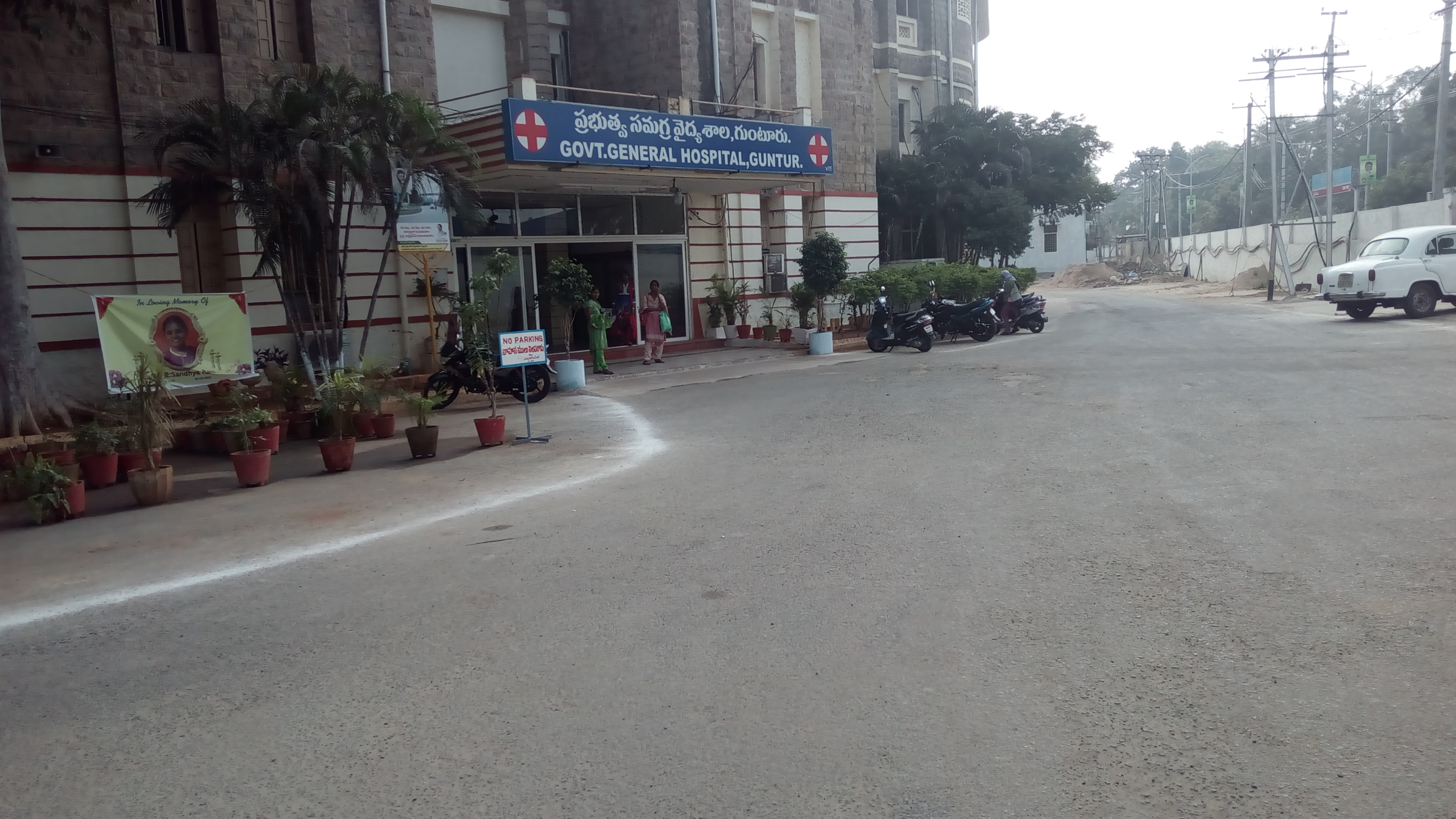
General Hospital in Guntur

Healthcare is provided by government and private institutions. Some of the government or charitable hospitals include Guntur Government Hospital, All India Institute of Medical Sciences (AIIMS) in Mangalagiri. and the Sankara Eye Hospital.

== Notable people ==
- Aluri Chakrapani, film producer
- Jamuna, actress
- Krishna, film actor
- Posani Krishna Murali, actor, writer
- Dokka Manikya Vara Prasad, former State Minister
- Ambati Rayudu, former Indian Cricketer
- Kotha Raghuramaiah, Member of Parliament and former Central Minister
- N. G. Ranga, Member of Parliament
- N. Bhaskara Rao, former Chief Minister of Andhra Pradesh
- Alla Ayodhya Rami Reddy, Member of Parliament and Founded Ramky Group of Companies
- A. V. Gurava Reddy, leading surgeon
- Bhavanam Venkatarami Reddy, former Chief Minister of Andhra Pradesh
- Kallam Anji Reddy, the founder of Dr. Reddy's Laboratories
- Kallam Satish Reddy present Chairman of Dr. Reddy's Laboratories
- Savitri, actress
- Sharada, actress and Member of Parliament
- Sumalatha, actress and Member of Parliament

== See also ==
- Timeline of Guntur
- List of people from Guntur
- Kollur Mine
