= Guntur East Assembly constituency =

Constituency of the Andhra Pradesh Legislative Assembly, India

Coordinates: 16.30°N 80.45°E

Guntur East
- Constituency No. 95 for the Andhra Pradesh Legislative Assembly
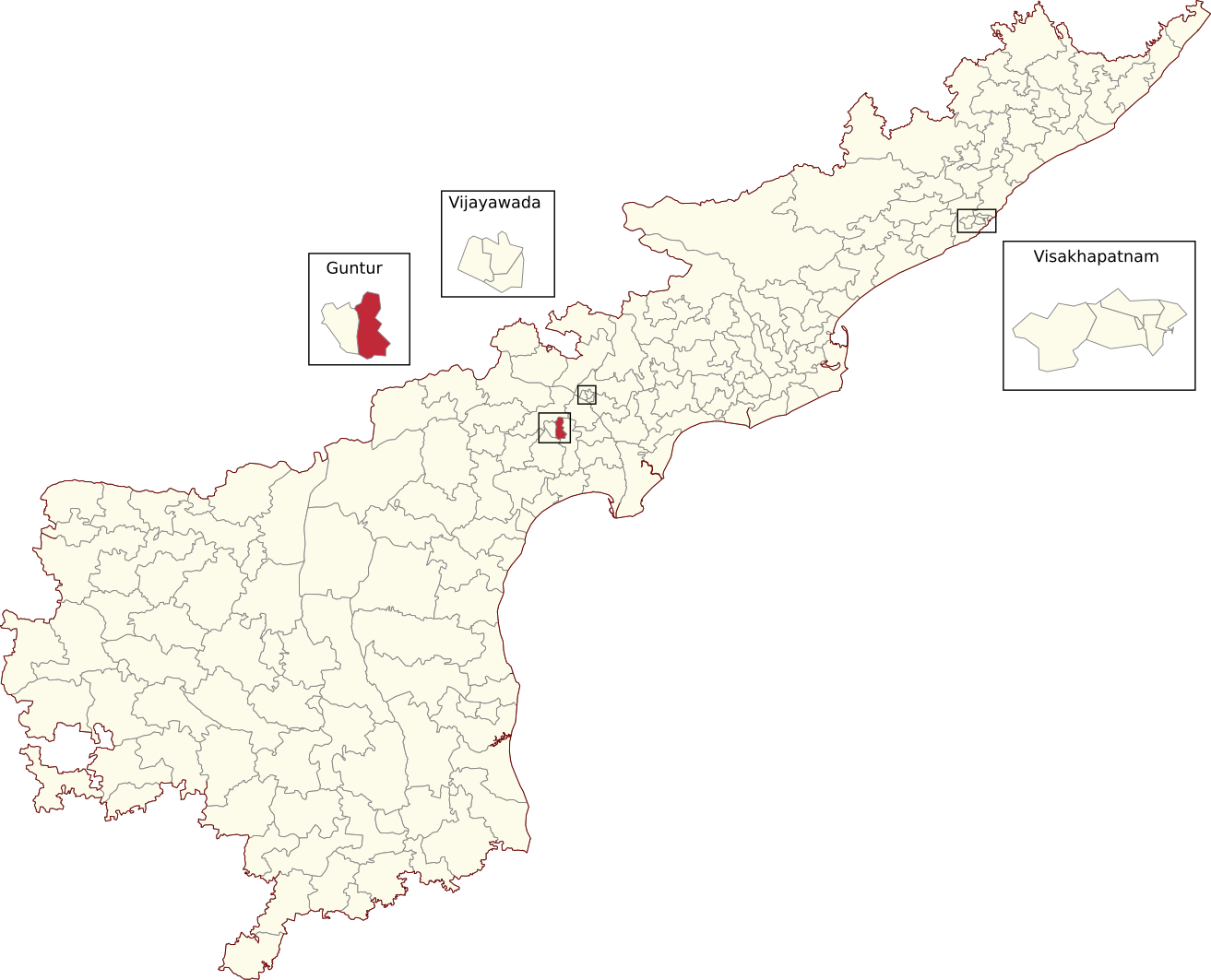
- Location of Guntur East Assembly constituency within Andhra Pradesh

Constituency details
- Country: India
- Region: South India
- State: Andhra Pradesh
- District: Guntur
- Lok Sabha constituency: Guntur
- Established: 2008
- Total electors: 2,50,790
- Reservation: None

Member of Legislative Assembly
- 16th Andhra Pradesh Legislative Assembly
- Incumbent Mohammed Naseer Ahmed
- Party: TDP
- Alliance: NDA
- Elected year: 2024

Guntur East is a constituency in Guntur district of Andhra Pradesh that elects representatives to the Andhra Pradesh Legislative Assembly in India. It is one of the seven assembly segments of Guntur Lok Sabha constituency.

Mohammed Naseer Ahmed is the current MLA of the constituency, having won the 2024 Andhra Pradesh Legislative Assembly election from Telugu Desam Party. As of 2024, there are a total of 2,50,790 electors in the constituency. The constituency was established in 2008, as per the Delimitation Orders (2008).

== Mandals ==
It covers Guntur mandal (Part), Guntur (M.Corp) (Part) and Guntur (M.Corp) – Ward No.7 to 23.

Mandal
Guntur mandal

== Members of the Legislative Assembly ==
Year	Member	Political party
2009	Shaik Mastan Vali	Indian National Congress
2014	Mohammad Musthafa Shaik	YSR Congress Party
2019	Mohammad Musthafa Shaik	YSR Congress Party
2024	Mohammed Naseer Ahmed	Telugu Desam Party

== Election results ==
=== 2024 ===
2024 Andhra Pradesh Legislative Assembly election: Guntur East
Party	Candidate	Votes	%	±%
TDP	Mohammed Naseer Ahmed	100,815	56.17	
YSRCP	Noori Fathima	68,853	38.36	
INC	Shaik Mastan Valli	5,239	2.92	
NOTA	None of the above	1,215	0.68	
Majority		31,962	17.81	
Turnout		1,79,491	70.47	
TDP gain from YSRCP		Swing		

=== 2019 ===
2019 Andhra Pradesh Legislative Assembly election: Guntur East
Party	Candidate	Votes	%	±%
YSRCP	Mohammad Musthafa Shaik	77,047	47.70	
TDP	Mohammad Nazeer	54,956	34.02	
JSP	Zia Ur Rahman Shaik	21,508	13.32	
Majority		22,091	13.68	
Turnout		1,61,522	70.25	
YSRCP hold		Swing		

=== 2014 ===
2014 Andhra Pradesh Legislative Assembly election: Guntur East
Party	Candidate	Votes	%	±%
YSRCP	Mohammad Musthafa Shaik	74,131	47.66	
TDP	Maddali Giridhar Rao	70,980	45.63	
Majority		3,151	2.02	
Turnout		1,55,549	68.59	
YSRCP gain from INC		Swing		

=== 2009 ===
2009 Andhra Pradesh Legislative Assembly election: Guntur East
Party	Candidate	Votes	%	±%
INC	Shaik Mastan Vali	45,586	38.45	
PRP	Shaik Showkat	36,574	30.84	
TDP	SM Ziyauddin	29,926	25.24	
Majority		9,012	7.60	
Turnout		118831	64.69	
INC hold		Swing		

== See also ==
- List of constituencies of Andhra Pradesh Legislative Assembly
