= Guntur Lok Sabha constituency =

Lok Sabha Constituency in Andhra Pradesh

Coordinates: 16.3°N 80.4°E

Guntur AP-13
- Lok Sabha constituency
- Interactive Map Outlining Guntur Lok Sabha constituency

Constituency details
- Country: India
- Region: South India
- State: Andhra Pradesh
- Assembly constituencies: Tadikonda; Mangalagiri; Ponnur; Tenali; Prathipadu; Guntur West; Guntur East
- Established: 1952
- Total electors: 17,93,324
- Reservation: None

Member of Parliament
- 18th Lok Sabha
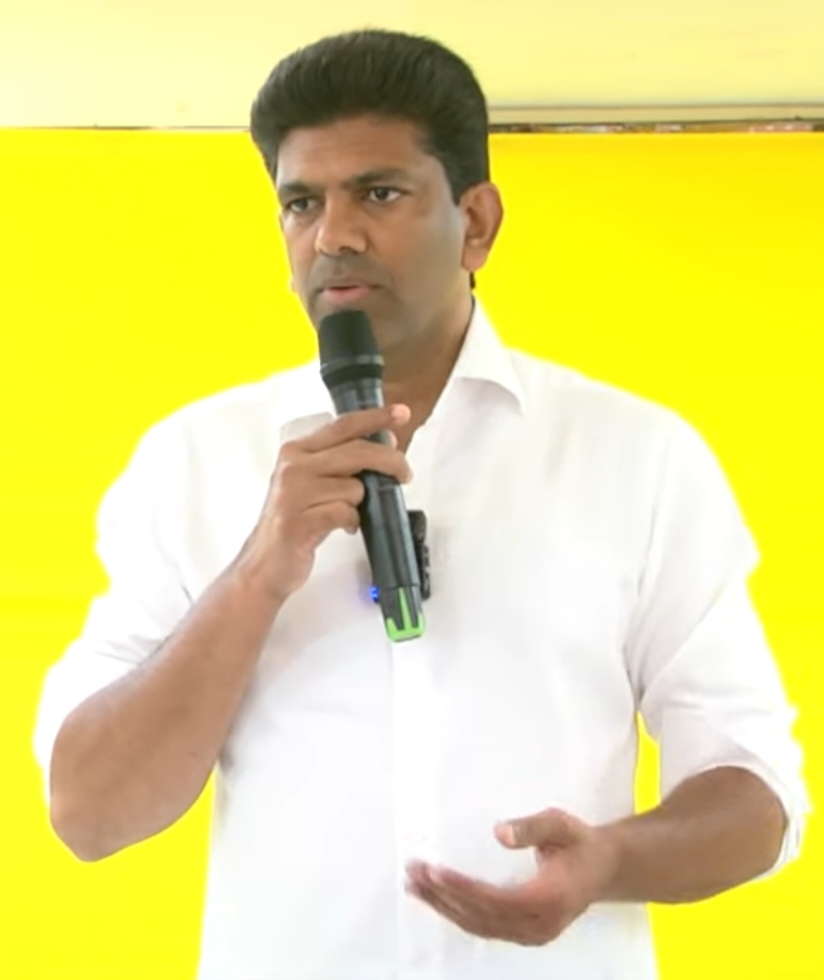
- Incumbent Chandra Sekhar Pemmasani
- Party: TDP
- Alliance: NDA
- Elected year: 2024
- Preceded by: Galla Jayadev

Guntur Lok Sabha constituency is one of the twenty-five lok sabha constituencies of Andhra Pradesh in India. It comprises seven assembly segments and belongs to Guntur district. Chandra Sekhar Pemmasani is currently serving as the MP since June 2024. This constituency was earlier represented by Galla Jayadev who won the 2014 and 2019 Lok Sabha elections representing Telugu Desam Party.

Most Successful parties from Guntur Lok Sabha
1. INC (12 Times) (67.0%)
2. TDP (5 Times) (28.0%)
3. Independent (1 time) (5.00%)

== Assembly segments ==
Guntur constituency presently comprises the following legislative assembly segments:

#	Name	District	Member	Party	Leading (in 2024)
86	Tadikonda (SC)	Guntur	Tenali Sravan Kumar	TDP	TDP
87	Mangalagiri	Guntur	Nara Lokesh	TDP	TDP
88	Ponnur	Guntur	Dhulipalla Narendra Kumar	TDP	TDP
91	Tenali	Guntur	Nadendla Manohar	JSP	TDP
93	Prathipadu (SC)	Guntur	Burla Ramanjaneyulu	TDP	TDP
94	Guntur West	Guntur	Galla Madhavi	TDP	TDP
95	Guntur East	Guntur	Mohammed Naseer Ahmed	TDP	TDP

== Members of Parliament ==
Year	Member	Party
1952	S. V. L. Narasimham	Independent
1957	Kotha Raghuramaiah	Indian National Congress
1962	Kotha Raghuramaiah	Indian National Congress
1967	Kotha Raghuramaiah	Indian National Congress
1971	Kotha Raghuramaiah	Indian National Congress
1977	Kotha Raghuramaiah	Indian National Congress
1980	N. G. Ranga	Indian National Congress
1984	N. G. Ranga	Indian National Congress
1989	N. G. Ranga	Indian National Congress
1991	S. M. Laljan Basha	Telugu Desam Party
1996	Rayapati Sambasiva Rao	Indian National Congress
1998	Rayapati Sambasiva Rao	Indian National Congress
1999	Yemparala Venkateswara Rao	Telugu Desam Party
2004	Rayapati Sambasiva Rao	Indian National Congress
2009	Rayapati Sambasiva Rao	Indian National Congress
2014	Galla Jayadev	Telugu Desam Party
2019	Galla Jayadev	Telugu Desam Party
2024	Chandra Sekhar Pemmasani	Telugu Desam Party

== Election results ==
=== General Election 2024 ===
2024 Indian general elections: Guntur
Party	Candidate	Votes	%	±%
TDP	Dr. Chandra Sekhar Pemmasani	864,948	60.68	▲17.18
YSRCP	Kilari Venkata Rosaiah	5,20,253	36.50	▼6.69
CPI	Jangala Ajay Kumar	8,637	0.61	
NOTA	None Of The Above	7,387	0.52	
Majority		3,44,695	24.18	
Total valid votes		14,25,371		
Turnout		14,37,528	80.16	
Registered electors		17,93,324		
TDP hold		Swing		

==== Legislative Assembly Constituency wise Results 2024 ====
No.	Constituency	1st Position	Party	Votes	2nd Position	Party	Votes
86	Tadikonda (SC)	Chandra Sekhar Pemmasani	TDP	1,05,558	Kilari Venkata Rosaiah	YSRCP	71,973
87	Mangalagiri	Chandra Sekhar Pemmasani	TDP	1,62,935	Kilari Venkata Rosaiah	YSRCP	80,230
88	Ponnur	Chandra Sekhar Pemmasani	TDP	1,07,160	Kilari Venkata Rosaiah	YSRCP	77,277
91	Tenali	Chandra Sekhar Pemmasani	TDP	1,25,362	Kilari Venkata Rosaiah	YSRCP	71,608
93	Prathipadu (SC)	Chandra Sekhar Pemmasani	TDP	1,30,433	Kilari Venkata Rosaiah	YSRCP	83,136
94	Guntur West	Chandra Sekhar Pemmasani	TDP	1,16,804	Kilari Venkata Rosaiah	YSRCP	63,524
95	Guntur East	Chandra Sekhar Pemmasani	TDP	1,02,768	Kilari Venkata Rosaiah	YSRCP	65,815
Postal Ballot Papers		Chandra Sekhar Pemmasani	TDP	13,928	Kilari Venkata Rosaiah	YSRCP	6,690

=== General Election 2019 ===
General Election, 2019: Guntur
Party	Candidate	Votes	%	±%
TDP	Galla Jayadev	587,918	43.50	
YSRCP	Modugula Venugopala Reddy	583,713	43.19	
JSP	Bonaboyina Srinivasa Yadav	125,205	9.56	
INC	Shaik Mastanvali	14,205	1.05	
Majority		4,205	0.31	
Turnout		13,51,474	79.21	
Registered electors		17,06,119		
TDP hold		Swing		

=== General Election 2014 ===
General Election, 2014: Guntur
Party	Candidate	Votes	%	±%
TDP	Galla Jayadev	618,417	49.67	
YSRCP	Vallabhaneni Balashowry	549,306	44.12	
INC	Abdul Waheed Shaik	46,818	3.76	
JSP	Mallela Venkata Rao	5,608	0.45	
BSP	Mallela Babu Rao	4,223	0.33	
AAP	Kata Veera Vara Prasad	2,344	0.18	
NOTA	None of the Above	7,596	0.61	
Majority		69,111	5.55	
Turnout		12,44,926	79.20	+2.67
TDP gain from INC		Swing		

=== General Election 2009 ===
General Election, 2009: Guntur
Party	Candidate	Votes	%	±%
INC	Rayapati Sambasiva Rao	403,937	38.66	−18.09
TDP	Rajendra Madala	364,582	34.90	−6.05
PRP	Thota Chandra Sekhar	227,764	21.80	
Majority		39,355	3.76	
Turnout		1,044,731	76.53	+6.50
INC hold		Swing		

=== General Election 2004 ===
General Election, 2004: Guntur
Party	Candidate	Votes	%	±%
INC	Rayapati Sambasiva Rao	466,221	56.75	+10.83
TDP	Yemparala Venkateswara Rao	336,429	40.95	−10.13
BSP	Jupalli Hanumantha Rao Goud	9,375	1.14	+1.14
TRS	Venkateswarlu Gundi	5,444	0.66	+0.66
Independent	Muvva Venkat Rao	4,009	0.49	+0.46
Majority		129,792	15.80	
Turnout		8,21,478	70.03	+7.01
INC gain from TDP		Swing		

=== General Election 1999 ===
General Election, 1999: Guntur
Party	Candidate	Votes	%	±%
TDP	Yemparala Venkateswararao	399,065	51.08	+10.92
INC	Rayapati Sambasiva Rao	358,735	45.92	−1.87
Majority		40,330	5.16	
Turnout		781,254	63.02	+3.54
TDP gain from INC		Swing		

=== General Election 1998 ===
General Election, 1998: Guntur
Party	Candidate	Votes	%	±%
INC	Rayapati Sambasiva Rao	359,456	47.79	+0.97
TDP	S. M. Laljan Basha	302,109	40.16	+2.69
BJP	Avula Veerasekhararao	82,193	10.93	
Majority		57,347	7.63	
Turnout		752,220	59.48	+1.77
INC hold		Swing		

=== General Election 1996 ===
General Election, 1996: Guntur
Party	Candidate	Votes	%	±%
INC	Rayapati Sambasiva Rao	343,252	46.82	+1.55
TDP	S. M. Laljan Basha	274,753	37.47	−10.08
NTRTDP(LP)	Makineni Peda Rathaiah	89,098	12.15	
Majority		68,499	9.35	
Turnout		733,191	57.71	−0.23
INC gain from TDP		Swing		

=== General Election 1991 ===
General Election, 1991: Guntur
Party	Candidate	Votes	%	±%
TDP	S. M. Laljan Basha	307,073	47.55	+2.27
INC	N. G. Ranga	292,329	45.27	−8.68
Majority		14,744	2.28	
Turnout		645,726	57.94	−9.37
TDP gain from INC		Swing		

=== General Election 1989 ===
General Election, 1989: Guntur
Party	Candidate	Votes	%	±%
INC	N. G. Ranga	404,558	53.95	+4.43
TDP	M S S Koteswararao	339,545	45.28	−2.23
Majority		65,013	8.67	
Turnout		749,809	67.31	+1.21
INC hold		Swing		

== See also ==
- List of constituencies of the Andhra Pradesh Legislative Assembly
