= Yemparala Venkateswara Rao =

Indian politician

Member of Parliament, Lok Sabha
- In office 1999–2004
- Preceded by: Rayapati Sambasiva Rao
- Succeeded by: Rayapati Sambasiva Rao
- Constituency: Guntur

Personal details
- Born: 1 March 1932 (age 94)
- Party: Telugu Desam Party
- Spouse: Rajeswari
- Education: Hindu College, Guntur

Yemparala Venkateswara Rao is an Indian politician who served as Member of 13th Lok Sabha from Guntur Lok Sabha constituency. In 1999 Indian general election, he got 3,99,065 votes.

== Personal life ==
He was born on 1 March 1932 and married Rajeswari on 8 March 1950. He was educated from Hindu College, Guntur.
