= C. M. Prasad =

Indian psychiatrist

Dr. C.M. Prasad
- Born: Channavajjala Mallikarjuna Prasad; 14 May 1948 (age 78); Guntur, Andhra Pradesh, India
- Occupation: Psychiatrist

Channavajjala Mallikarjuna Prasad (born May 14, 1948), commonly known as C. M. Prasad, is an Indian born physician/psychiatrist in the Washington, DC area.

== Education ==
C.M. Prasad acquired a bachelor's degree from Andhra Christian College, Guntur, Andhra University in 1968. He went on in 1972 to graduate with a master's degree in pharmacology from Maharaja Sayajirao University of Baroda. He pursued postgraduate research work at the University of Bombay and obtained his PhD in Pharmacology in 1977.

Prasad started as a research scientist at the University of Texas Medical Center in Houston in 1978. He taught and carried out research in pharmacology at the University of Houston, TX in 1979. His research during 1978-1982 addressed studies into the mechanisms of neuronal and neurohumoral transmission. He obtained his medical degree in 1984 at the Medical School in Juarez, Mexico. That was followed by psychiatry training in St. Elizabeths hospital in Washington, DC during 1984–88, and then a year of neurology in Mt. Sinai Hospital in New York. Prasad specialized in researching basal ganglia mineralization in schizophrenic patients.

== Career ==
Prasad has certifications in psychiatry and addiction medicine. He is also involved in geriatric psychiatry, pain management, prison psychiatry and electroconvulsive therapy. Prasad is a member of the American Psychiatric Association, Washington Psychiatric Society, American Board of Addiction Medicine, American Board of Physician Specialists, American Board of Psychiatric Medicine, American Board of Pain Management, American Association of Physicians of India Origin, the Indo-American Psychiatric Association, and the National Association of certified Hypnotherapists.

Prasad retired from his affiliation with St. Elizabeths Hospital in 2011 and continued to practice as an independent consultant psychiatrist in private practice in several Washington, DC area hospitals. He is the medical director in a Neighbors' Cosejo, a nonprofit organization for the benefit of homeless Hispanic population in need of services for mental health, alcohol/substance abuse, rehabilitation and affordable housing in Washington, DC.

== Awards ==
- He received the Pravasi Divas award for his achievements in the field of medicine at national and international levels from Lt. Governor of Pondicherry Sardar Dr. Iqbal Singh at an event held in Hotel Le Meridian of New Delhi.
- He was elected to the status of a Distinguished Fellow of the American Psychiatric Association in December 2011.
- He was recognized by the Global Organization of People of Indian Origin (GOPIO) in 2014 as one of its honorees who have excelled in the fields of education, business, industry, and community service.
- On 14 December 2010 he was honored by the "Maryland India Business Round Table"(MIBRT) with the "MIBRT award for excellence in Psychiatry and Addiction Medicine Practice & Counseling Service of the year".
- He received the honor from Honorable Ben Cardin, Maryland Senator, in recognition of his commitment and services in providing Medical, Psychiatric and Counseling in the Washington DC metro area.
- On 26 May 2011 he received Maryland Governor's Citation in recognition of leadership in promoting business, trade and job growth in Maryland.
- He was recognized in the Congressional Record on 6 September 2018 for his exceptional contributions to the international medical community.

== Publications ==
- Casanova, MF; Prasad, CM; Waldman, I; Illowsky, B; Stein, B; Weinberger, DR; Kleinman, JB (1990). "No difference in basal ganglia mineralization between schizophrenic and nonschizophrenic patients: A quantitative computerized tomographic study". Biological Psychiatry. 27 (2): 138–42. doi:10.1016/0006-3223(90)90643-g. PMID 2294977. S2CID 24301613.
- Prasad, CM; Pardo, L; Rigor, BM; Dafny, N (1985). "Dose effects of halothane on sensory evoked responses obtained from the cortex, reticular formation and central gray". The International Journal of Neuroscience. 27 (1–2): 91–100. doi:10.3109/00207458509149138. PMID 4019066.
- Tadepalli, AS; Prasad, CM (1982). "Depression of reflex vagal bradycardia by a central action of phentolamine in the spinal cat". Archives Internationales de Pharmacodynamie et de Thérapie. 257 (1): 77–86. PMID 7114972.
- Prasad, CM; Adamski, SW; Svensjö, E; Grega, GJ (1982). "Pharmacological modification of the edema produced by combined infusions of prostaglandin E1 and bradykinin in canine forelimbs". The Journal of Pharmacology and Experimental Therapeutics. 220 (2): 293–8. doi:10.1016/S0022-3565(25)32936-8. PMID 6173476.
- Amelang, E; Prasad, CM; Raymond, RM; Grega, GJ (1981). "Interactions among inflammatory mediators on edema formation in the canine forelimb". Circulation Research. 49 (2): 298–306. doi:10.1161/01.res.49.2.298. PMID 7249267.
- Prasad, CM; Nair, KG; Sheth, UK (1980). "Reversal of digoxin induced cardiac arrhythmias by nickel chloride". Research Communications in Chemical Pathology and Pharmacology. 27 (2): 405–8. PMID 7367757.
- Prasad, CM; Shah, DS; Gulati, OD (1973). "Some factors affecting the neuron blocking action of guanethidine, xylocholine, bretylium and debrisoquin". Japanese Journal of Pharmacology. 23 (6): 805–11. doi:10.1254/jjp.23.805. PMID 4544694.
