= Mohammed Naseer Ahmed =

Indian politician

Member of the Andhra Pradesh Legislative Assembly
- Incumbent
- Assumed office 2024
- Preceded by: Mohammad Musthafa Shaik
- Constituency: Guntur East

Personal details
- Political party: Telugu Desam Party

Mohammed Naseer Ahmed is an Indian politician of the Telugu Desam Party. He represents Guntur East Assembly constituency in the 16th Andhra Pradesh Assembly.

== Election results ==
=== 2024 ===
2024 Andhra Pradesh Legislative Assembly election: Guntur East
| Party | Candidate | Votes | % | ±% |
|---|---|---|---|---|
| TDP | Mohammed Naseer Ahmed | 100,815 | 56.17 | |
| YSRCP | Noori Fathima | 68,853 | 38.36 | |
| INC | Shaik Mastan Valli | 5,239 | 2.92 | |
| NOTA | None of the above | 1,215 | 0.68 | |
| Majority | | 31,962 | 17.81 | |
| Turnout | | 1,79,491 | 70.47 | |
| TDP gain from YSRCP | | Swing | | |
