= S. M. Laljan Basha =

Indian politician

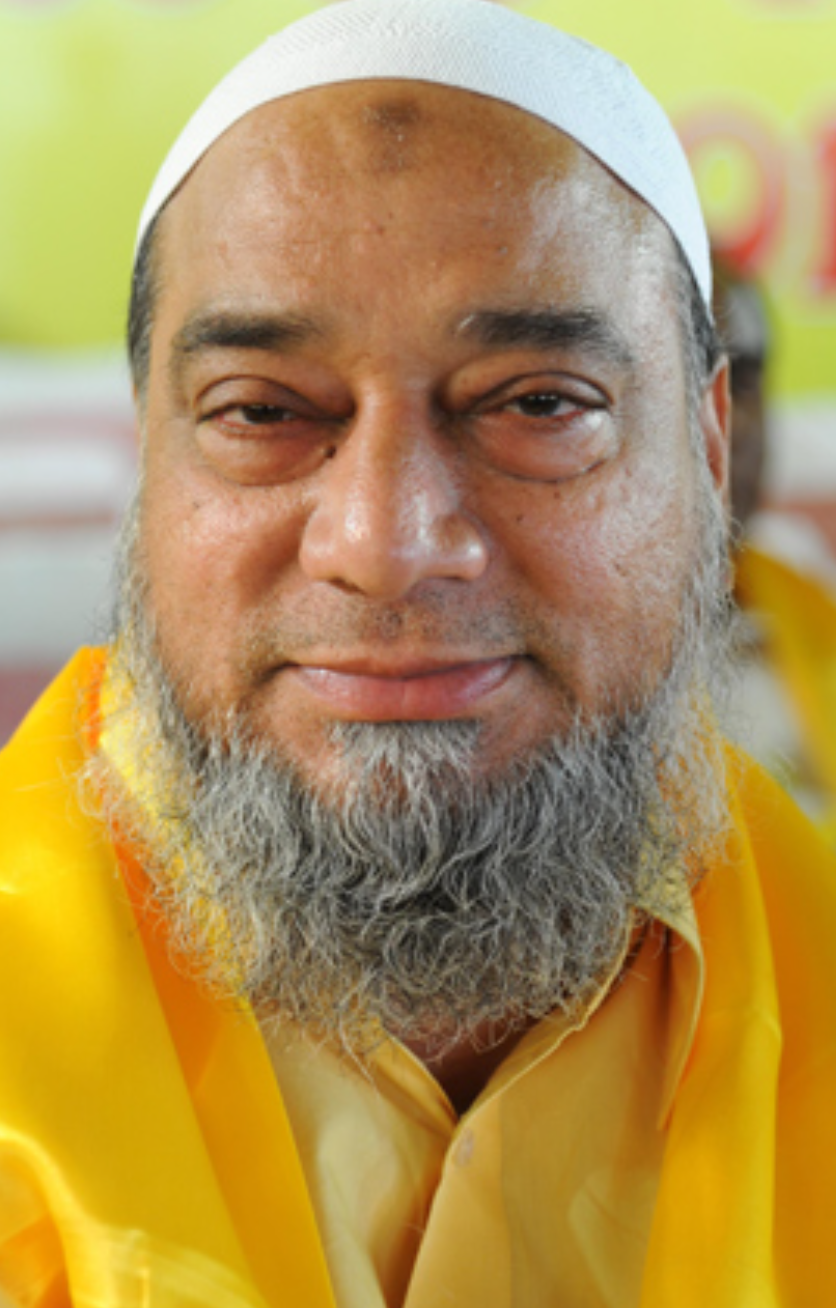

Member of Parliament, Rajya Sabha
- In office 10 April 2002 – 9 April 2008
- Preceded by: Jaya Prada
- Succeeded by: T. Ratna Bai
- Constituency: Andhra Pradesh

Member of Parliament, Lok Sabha
- In office 1991 - 1996
- Preceded by: N. G. Ranga
- Succeeded by: Rayapati Sambasiva Rao
- Constituency: Guntur

S.M Laljan Basha (2 August 1956 – 15 August 2013) was a iron merchant, politician, The Vice President of the Telugu Desam Party & Chairman of Joint Parliamentary Committee of Waqf, TDP Minority Wing & Bombay Mercantile Bank. He entered the Lok Sabha in 1991 from the Guntur Lok Sabha constituency on behalf of the Telugu Desam Party. He defeated prominent politician N. G. Ranga in the 1991 Lok Sabha elections. He later served as a member of the Rajya Sabhaa, the upper house of the Indian Parliament in 2002.S.M Laljan Basha is recognized as a key leader in Guntur.

== Life ==
Telugu Desam Party State Vice President and former Guntur MP Lal Jan Basha was born on 2 August 1956 in Guntur district. Basha got married in 1977. He has one son and four daughters. He often spent time with his mother, six younger brothers and four sisters. Basha, an iron merchant, joined the TDP during the NTR regime and rose through the ranks. In 1991, he contested from the Guntur parliamentary constituency against N. G. Ranga in Guntur and won, setting a record. Basha is known as the first TDP MP to win from here. However, he later contested from the Guntur constituency in 1996 and 98 and lost to Rayapati Sambasiva Rao . He contested from Narasaraopet in 1999 and lost to Nedurumalli Janardhana Reddy . Basha never left the Telugu Desam Party. He played an active role in the party's structural programs and organizational affairs. In recognition of his services to the party, Chandrababu Naidu appointed him as a Rajya Sabha member in 2002. He was a Rajya Sabha member from 2002 to 2008. Basha served as a member of the Politburo, the party's General Secretary, the Chairman of Mercantile Bank, and the Chairman of the TDP Minority Wing. Basha raised his voice in the Lok Sabha and Rajya Sabha on the problems faced by minorities in the country, on foreign policy, and on the hardships of people of various communities. He brought the problems and difficulties faced by Telugus in Saudi Arabia to the attention of the Central Government. Basha also played an important role in the formulation of the Deepam scheme implemented during the Telugu Desam regime for the welfare of women. Basha played a key role in drafting the TDP's announced minority declaration. He worked tirelessly for the advancement of minorities and was a great advocate.
