= Shaik Mastan Vali =

Indian politician

Member of Legislative Assembly, Andhra Pradesh
- In office 2009–2014
- Preceded by: Constituency established
- Succeeded by: Mohammad Musthafa Shaik
- Constituency: Guntur East

Personal details
- Party: Indian National Congress

Shaik Mastan Vali is an Indian politician from Andhra Pradesh. He is a member of the Indian National Congress. He was a Member of Andhra Pradesh Legislative Assembly from Guntur East Assembly constituency.

== Career ==
Mastan Vali was made City Congress party president in 2008. He was elected as an MLA in 2009 from Guntur East constituency.

== Previous Position Held ==
- 2009 Elected Member Of Legislative Assembly Guntur East Constuiency
- 2011- 2013 Chairman, Committee on Welfare of Minorities, Andhra Pradesh Legislative Assembly
