= Chandra Sekhar Pemmasani =

Indian physician, businessperson and politician (born 1976)

Dr. Chandra Sekhar Pemmasani
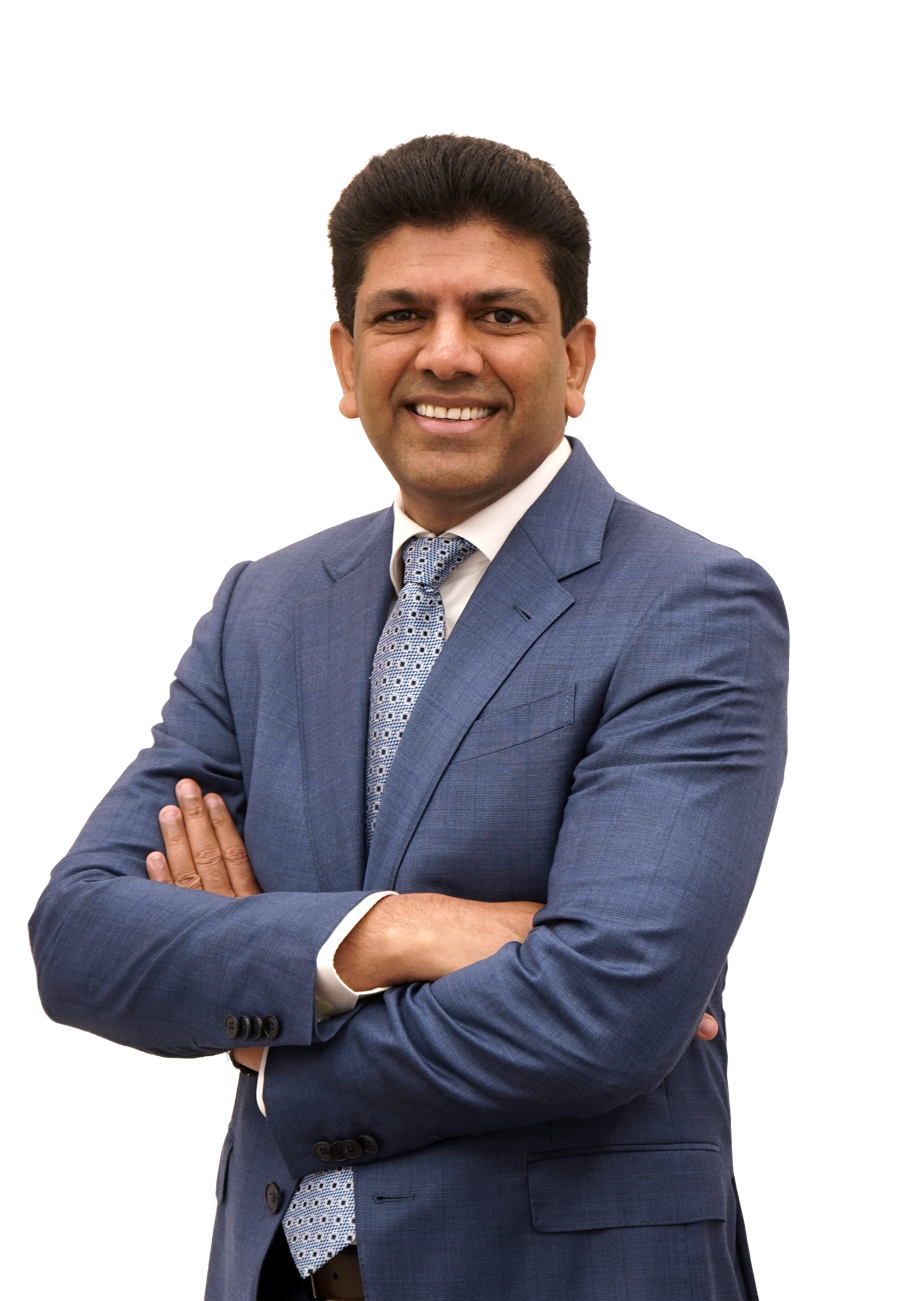

28th Union Minister of State for Communications
- Incumbent
- Assumed office 10 June 2024
- Minister: Jyotiraditya Scindia
- Preceded by: Devusinh Jesingbhai Chauhan

28th Union Minister of State for Rural Development
- Incumbent
- Assumed office 10 June 2024 Serving with Kamlesh Paswan
- Minister: Shivraj Singh Chouhan
- Preceded by: Faggan Singh Kulaste

Member of Parliament, Lok Sabha
- Incumbent
- Assumed office 4 June 2024
- Preceded by: Galla Jayadev
- Constituency: Guntur, Andhra Pradesh

Personal details
- Born: 7 March 1976 (age 50) Burripalem, Andhra Pradesh, India
- Party: Telugu Desam Party (TDP)
- Spouse: Dr. Sri Ratna Koneru (m. 2001)
- Children: 2
- Parents: Sambasiva Rao Pemmasani (father); Suvarchala Pemmasani (mother)
- Education: Internal Medicine Residency (Geisinger Medical Center); M.B.B.S. (Osmania Medical College)
- Occupation: Physician; businessperson; politician; CEO of UWorld
- Website: www.drpemmasani.com

Chandra Sekhar Pemmasani (born 7 March 1976) is an Indian physician, businessperson, and politician currently serving as the 28th Minister of State for Rural Development and Communications since June 2024. He was elected as a Member of parliament to the 18th Lok Sabha from Guntur Lok Sabha constituency, Andhra Pradesh. He won the 2024 Indian general election as a Telugu Desam Party (TDP) candidate.

== Early life and education ==
Pemmasani was born on 7 March 1976 at Burripalem, Guntur district in present-day Andhra Pradesh in an agricultural family to Pemmasani Sambasiva Rao and his wife Suvarchala. He has a brother named Ravi Shankar Pemmasani. Although he was born in Burripalem, he spent some time in his childhood in Narasaraopet because of his father's hotel business. He completed his 10th class in 1991 and his intermediate in 1993. With aspirations to become a doctor, he secured 27th rank out of 60,000 students in the EAMCET in 1993–94 and obtained a seat at Osmania Medical College in Hyderabad.

He finished his postgraduate training in internal medicine at Geisinger Medical Center in Danville, Pennsylvania. In the course of his postgraduate training, he served as the representative of Pennsylvania in a national medical knowledge competition for two consecutive years. Subsequently, he served as an attending physician at Johns Hopkins University and Sinai Hospital for approximately five years, teaching residents and medical students.

== Medical Career and UWorld ==
Pemmasani is the founder of UWorld, a test preparation company headquartered in Dallas, Texas, United States. In 2020, he received the Ernst & Young Entrepreneur of the Year Award for the Southwest United States region, recognizing his work building UWorld.

== Political career ==
Pemmasani’s father, Sambasivarao, was fond of N. T. Rama Rao. Due to this connection, he joined the Telugu Desam Party. He later served as the Deputy Chairman of Narasaraopet town. Following his father’s involvement in politics, Pemmasani also joined the same party. He admired N. Chandrababu Naidu greatly. When Naidu became Chief Minister of Andhra Pradesh, Pemmasani actively participated in organizing events held in the US during his visits.

From 2010, Pemmasani was involved with the Telugu Desam Party’s NRI wing, supporting the party’s welfare programmes among the diaspora, before formally joining the party in 2013. In 2014 and 2019, Pemmasani attempted to secure a Narasaraopet Lok Sabha ticket from Telugu Desam Party. However, due to the opportunity given to the former Indian National Congress leader Rayapati Sambasiva Rao, he withdrew for a considerable period.

=== 2024 General Election ===
He ran in the 2024 Indian general election from Guntur Lok Sabha constituency as a Telugu Desam Party candidate, and won with 864,948 votes (60.68%), a margin of 344,695 votes over runner-up Kilari Venkata Rosaiah of the YSR Congress Party, succeeding former member Galla Jayadev, who had announced he was taking a break from politics in January 2024.

== Ministerial Role ==
Pemmasani has served as the 28th Minister of State for Rural Development and Communications since 10 June 2024, serving alongside Cabinet Ministers Shivraj Singh Chouhan and Jyotiraditya Scindia respectively.

In the communications portfolio, he has held regular reviews of India Post’s postal circles and its technology-driven modernisation programme, focused on operational efficiency, financial inclusion, and revenue growth.

In the rural development portfolio, he has reviewed the progress of livelihoods programmes including the Deendayal Antyodaya Yojana-National Rural Livelihood Mission in Andhra Pradesh. He has also conducted field visits to review centrally funded projects in states including Manipur.

== Philanthropy ==
Pemmasani contributed to the provision of free potable water to residents of the Palnadu region in Andhra Pradesh, within the Guntur district. He provided funding for educational support for children and adults, and has contributed charitably to local community entities.

He founded the Pemmasani Foundation, which has organized health camps and drinking-water access projects in the Guntur and Narasaraopet areas of Andhra Pradesh.

== Election Statistics ==
| Year | Contested for | Party | Constituency | Opponent | Votes | Vote share | Margin | Result |
|---|---|---|---|---|---|---|---|---|
| 2024 | Lok Sabha | Telugu Desam Party (TDP) | Guntur | Kilari Venkata Rosaiah (YSRCP) | 864,948 | 60.68% | 344,695 | Won |

== See also ==
- Third Modi ministry
