= Sistla Venkata Lakshmi Narasimha Rao =

Indian politician (1911–2006)

Sistla Venkata Lakshmi Narasimham

Member of Parliament, Lok Sabha
- In office 1952 - 1957
- Preceded by: First General Election
- Succeeded by: Kotha Raghuramaiah
- Constituency: Guntur

Personal details
- Born: 24 May 1911 Pedapulivarru, Krishna District, Andhra Pradesh, India
- Died: 28 September 2006 (aged 95) Guntur, Andhra Pradesh, India
- Party: Independent politician
- Spouse: Rajyalakshmi
- Children: 7; 5 sons and 2 daughters

Sistla Venkata Lakshmi Narasimham, known as S. V. L. Narasimham (24 May 1911 – 28 September 2006) was Senior Advocate, Trade Union activist and the 1st Lok Sabha member from Guntur constituency, Madras State, India.

He was born to Shri S. V. Purushottam on 24 May 1911. He was educated at Andhra Christian College, Guntur and Law College, Madras and Law College, Trivandrum. He practiced law from 1936 till 2004. He represented the Brodipet ward as a councillor in 1939. He was secretary of Bar Association, Guntur in 1942–43 and was Bar Association president consecutively from 1965 to 1970. He served jail terms twice during Indian freedom movement.

He led the Trade Union of Krishna Cement Company as its president in 1930s. In 1952, he contested as an independent candidate and won by a majority of 1,03,126 votes against the veteran parliamentarian N. G. Ranga (Krushikar Party).

He died in Guntur on 28 September 2006. He left behind his wife, five sons and two daughters.
