= Rayapati Sambasiva Rao =

Indian politician

Member of Parliament, Lok Sabha
- In office 16 May 2014 – 23 May 2019
- Preceded by: Modugula Venugopala Reddy
- Succeeded by: Lavu Sri Krishna Devarayalu
- Constituency: Narasaraopet
- In office 13 May 2004 – 16 May 2014
- Preceded by: Yemparala Venkateswara Rao
- Succeeded by: Jayadev Galla
- Constituency: Guntur
- In office 10 May 1996 – 18 April 1999
- Preceded by: S. M. Laljan Basha
- Succeeded by: Yemparala Venkateswara Rao
- Constituency: Guntur

Member of Parliament, Rajya Sabha
- In office 1982–1988
- Preceded by: M. R. Krishna
- Succeeded by: L. Narsing Naik
- Constituency: Andhra Pradesh

Personal details
- Born: 7 June 1943 (age 83) Unguturu, Madras Presidency, British India
- Party: Telugu Desam Party (since 2014)
- Other political affiliations: Indian National Congress (1982-2014)
- Spouse: Leela Kumari
- Children: Rayapati Ranga Rao, Marni Devika Rani, Muthavarapu Lakshmi
- As of 16 September, 2006

Rayapati Sambasiva Rao is an Indian politician and a member of the 11th, 12th, 14th, 15th, and 16th Lok Sabha. He was one of the youngest members to be elected to the Rajya Sabha at the age of 39. He represented the Narasaraopet and Guntur parliamentary constituency of Andhra Pradesh and currently is a member of the Telugu Desam Party.

== Early life ==
Rao was born in Unguturu, Guntur district, Andhra Pradesh. His father, Venkata Ranga Rao, was a farmer and a follower of Shaivism. His mother, Sitaramamma was a housewife. Sambasivarao was eldest of the seven children. He completed his Secondary Education from Tadikonda and graduated from New Science College, Hyderabad.

== Politics ==
He was inspired by the Indian National Congress, led by then-Prime Minister Indira Gandhi and his maternal uncle Gogineni Kanakaiah, who was also a prominent politician. He served as Sarpanch and President Panchayat Samithi, Tadikonda. He was elected as a member of the Rajya Sabha, and later elected to Lok Sabha for five terms.

== Bank fraud case ==
Sambasiva Rao is the prime accused in transstroy bank fraud case to the tune of 7926Cr Rupees. According to the chargesheet filed by Central Bureau of Investigation (CBI), Sambasiva Rao created fake companies in the name of his maids, drivers and sweepers for diversion of funds from Banks.

== Personal life ==
Sambasiva Rao is married to Leela Kumari. They have one son, Rayapati Ranga Rao and two daughters Devika Rani and Lakshmi.
