= Mohammad Musthafa Shaik =

Indian politician

Mohammed Mustafa Shaik

Member of Legislative Assembly, Andhra Pradesh
- In office 2014–2024
- Preceded by: Shaik Mastan Vali
- Succeeded by: Mohammed Naseer Ahmed
- Constituency: Guntur East Assembly constituency

Personal details
- Party: YSR Congress Party
- Parent: Abdul Rehaman Shaik
- Education: 5th Pass 7th Class From S.V.V. High School, Tadikonda, Guntur, Discontinued, Year-1974-75

Mohammad Mustafa is an Indian politician from Andhra Pradesh. He was a member of Andhra Pradesh Legislative Assembly for the Guntur East Assembly constituency. He is a member of the regional political YSR Congress Party which won the assembly elections.

In November 2022, he announced his retirement from active politics and said that his daughter Noor Fathima would contest the next election in his place. He added that he would focus on his business to fund his daughter's election expenses.

== Early life ==
Mustafa hails from Guntur. His father was late Abdul Rehman Shaik. He is a businessman and his wife is also a director in his business establishment. His daughter Shaik Noori Fathima was nominated to contest the 2024 Andhra Pradesh Legislative Assembly Election from Guntur Constituency.

== Career ==
Mustafa won the 2019 Andhra Pradesh Legislative Assembly Election representing YSR Congress Party after defeating Mohammed Naseer of Telugu Desam Party by a margin of 22,091 votes.
