= Andhra Christian College =

College in India

- Other name: AC College
- Former names: United Lutheran Church Mission College (1907–1928); Arthur G. Watts Memorial College (1893–1907); American Evangelical Lutheran Mission College (1885–1926)
- Motto: Latin: ET COGNOSCETIS VERITATEM ET VERITAS LIBERABIT VOS
- Motto in English: Ye shall know the truth and the truth shall set you free
- College logo: Lotus flower
- Patron Saint: Saint George
- Type: Affiliating
- Established: 1885; 141 years ago
- Founder: Evangelical Lutheran Church in America (ELCA)
- Parent institution: Andhra Evangelical Lutheran Church Society (AELC)
- Accreditation: National Assessment and Accreditation Council (NAAC)
- Affiliations: Acharya Nagarjuna University (1977–present); Andhra University (1926–1977); University of Madras (1885–1926)
- Visitor: Dr. P. Raja Sekhar, Ph.D.
- Principal: Dr. K. Moses, Ph.D.
- Correspondent: The Rev. K. F. Paradesi Babu, AELC
- Total staff: 100+
- Location: Guntur, Andhra Pradesh, 522 001, India; 16°17′47.8″N 80°26′33.1″E
- Campus: 7 acres; Urban
- Language: Telugu and English
- Website: www.accollegeguntur.com

Andhra Christian College (A.C. College) is a Christian college in Guntur, Andhra Pradesh, India. It was established in 1885 by Protestant missionaries from the United States.

The college is administered by the Andhra Evangelical Lutheran Church through its Board of Education. It comprises a day college, an evening college, and a college of law, and offers intermediate, undergraduate, and postgraduate programmes.

== History ==
A.C. College was established in 1885 in Guntur City and was one of the first colleges in India to offer graduate programs. Protestant missionaries from the U.S.A established the college. The then United Lutheran Church in America (ULCA) through Rev. Fr. John Christian Frederick Heyer (known as Father Heyer) established the Andhra Evangelical Lutheran Church on 31 July 1842.

=== Succession of Administrators ===
The college has had distinguished pastors serving as administrators since its founding. The current Principal is Dr. Moses.

Sl. No	Name	Tenure	Domicile	Highest earned credentials
1	The Rev. Luther Benaiah Wolf, ELCA	1885–1891	United States	M.A. (Gettysburg)
2	The Rev. John Aberly, ELCA	1891–1892	United States	M.A. (Gettysburg)
3	The Rev. Luther Benaiah Wolf, ELCA	1892–1899	United States	M.A. (Gettusburg)
4	The Rev. Victor McCauley, ELCA	1899–1901	United States	M.A. (Gettysburg)
5	The Rev. Luther Benaiah Wolf, ELCA	1901–1907	United States	M.A. (Gettusburg)
6	The Rev. Lemon L. Uhl, ELCA	1907–1913	United States	Ph.D. (Johns Hopkins)
7	The Rev. John Roy Strock, ELCA	1913–1916	United States	M.A. (Gettysburg)
8	The Rev. George Alleman Rupley, ELCA	1916–1919	United States	M.A. (Princeton)
9	The Rev. John Roy Strock, ELCA	1919–1922	United States	M.A. (Gettysburg)
10	The Rev. Victor McCauley, ELCA	1922–1923	United States	M.A. (Gettysburg)
11	The Rev. Hiram Hill Sipes, ELCA	1923–1927	United States	M.A. (Pennsylvania)
12	The Rev. John Roy Strock, ELCA	1927–1933	United States	M.A. (Gettysburg)
13	The Rev. Hiram Hill Sipes, ELCA	1933–1936	United States	M.A. (Pennsylvania)
14	The Rev. John Roy Strock, ELCA	1936–1939	United States	M.A. (Gettysburg)
15	Sri Valaparla China John	1939–1941	India	
16	The Rev. Hiram Hill Sipes, ELCA	1941–1943	United States	M.A. (Pennsylvania)
17	The Rev. C. H. Swavely, ELCA	1943–1945	United States	M.A. (Pennsylvania)
18	The Rev. Hiram Hill Sipes, ELCA	1945–1948	United States	M.A. (Pennsylvania)
19	The Rev. C. H. Swavely, ELCA	1948–1950	United States	M.A. (Pennsylvania)
20	Rao Saheb T. S. Paulus	1951–1962	India	M.A. (Madras)
21	Sri John Bob Williams	1962–1965	India	Ph.D. (Columbia)
22	Sri Jonnakutti Paulus	1965–1968	India	M.A.
23	Sri M. G. Thomas	1968–1972	India	Ph.D.
24	Sri N. Issac	1972–1976	India	Ph.D. (Poona)
25	Sri C. Devadanam	1976–1982	India	Ph.D.
26	Sri P. Prabhudass	1982–1986	India	Ph.D.
27	Sri G. Samuel	1986–1987	India	Ph.D.
28	Sri Balla Jyothi Raju	1987–1992	India	Ph.D. (Iowa)
29	Sri B. Chandra Paul	1992–1998	India	
30	Sri R. R. S. Sundar Das	1999–2001	India	
31	Sri P. Andrew	2001–2003	India	Ph.D. (Nagarjuna)
32	Smt. D. M. Sujata	2003–2004	India	
33	Smt. R. Sulochana Devi	2004–2005	India	
34	Smt. D. M. Sujata	2005–2006	India	
35	Smt. K. E. Manorama Bai	2006–2013	India	
36	Sri K. E. Sasi Kiran	2013–2014	India	
37	Sri P. Mutyam	2014–2017	India	Ph.D.
38	Sri M. Emmanuel	2017–2018	India	M.Sc. (Nagarjuna)
39	Sri G. Deva Kumar	2018–2019	India	Ph.D. (Nagarjuna)
40	Smt. T. Anita Susan	2020–2021	India	Ph.D. (Nagarjuna)
41	Sri K. Moses	2022–	India	Ph.D. (Nagarjuna)

== Administration ==
Andhra Evangelical Lutheran Church (AELC) through its Board of Education administers the college. The school consists of three entities:

- Day College
- Evening College
- College of Law

== Academic profile ==
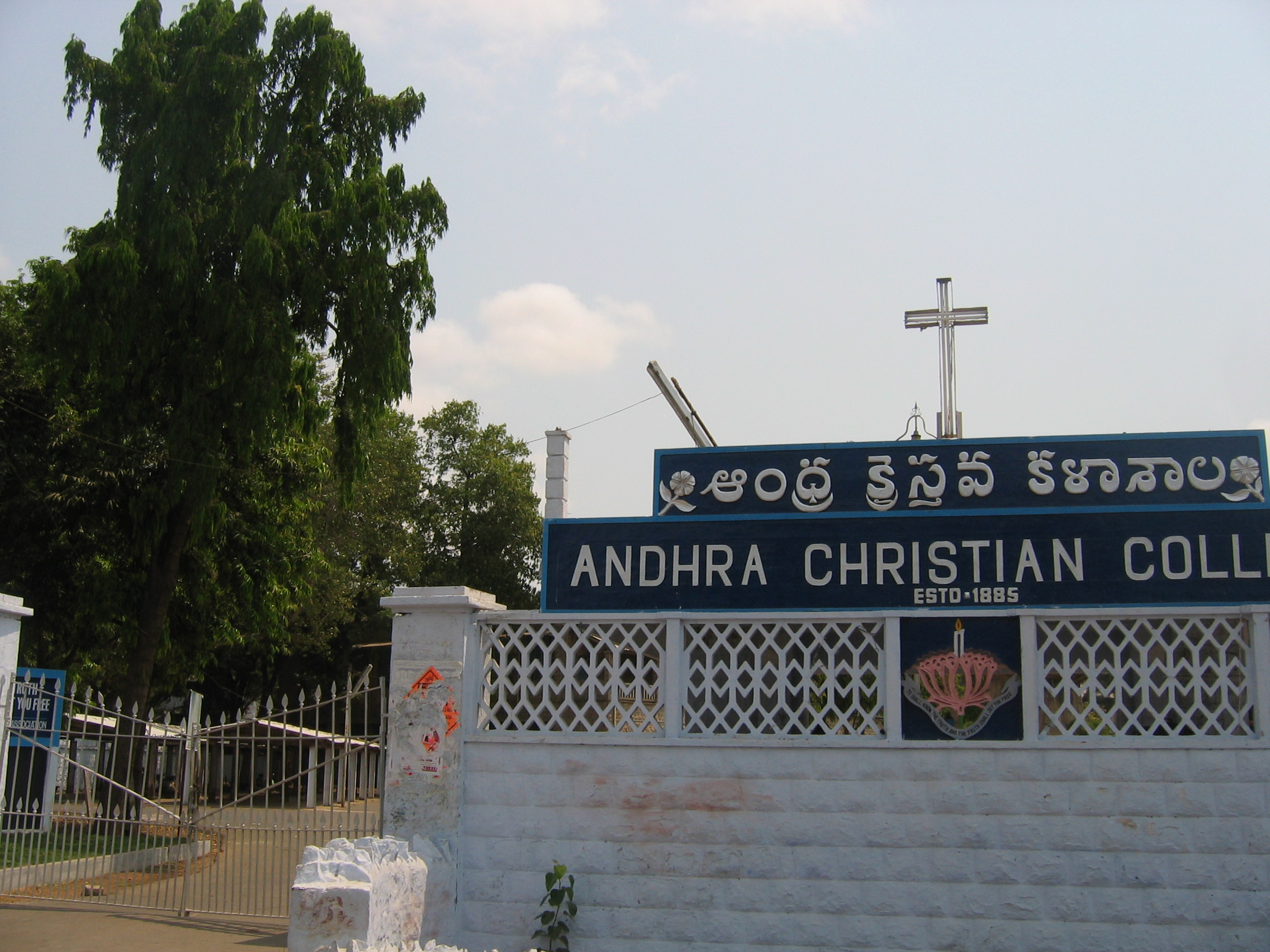
Main campus

- Intermediate
Pre-university or Intermediate courses are offered. The college is affiliated to the Board of Intermediate Education, Hyderabad, a regulatory authority for pre-university courses in Andhra Pradesh.

The following course combinations are available:

  - Biology, Physics, Chemistry
  - Mathematics, Physics, Chemistry
  - History, Economics, Civics
  - Civics, Economics, Commerce
- Graduate programmes
  - Bachelor of Arts (B.A.)
  - Bachelor of Science (B.Sc.)
  - Bachelor of Commerce (B.Com.)
- Post-graduate programmes
  - Master of Arts (M.A.) English and History
  - Master of Science (M.Sc.) Chemistry and Zoology

== Notable alumni ==
- Academics
  - Kamaraju Anil Kumar
- Judiciary
  - Justice L. Nageswara Rao
- Government Boards
  - B. S. Seleena
- Business
  - Tulasi Ramachandra Prabhu
- Medical
  - Kallam Anji Reddy
  - Dr. S. Amaranath
  - Dr. Karumuri Srinivasa Reddy
  - Mr. Tulasi Ramachandra Prabhu
  - Prof. Kamaraju Anil Kumar
  - Dr. Nori Dattatreyudu
  - C. M. Prasad
- Theology
  - Victor Premasagar
  - B. V. Subbamma
- Film
  - Sobhan Babu
  - N. T. Rama Rao
  - Jaggayya
  - Jaya Prakash Reddy
  - K. Viswanath
  - Betha Sudhakar
  - Maganti Venu Banerjee
- Civil Servants
  - J. D. Seelam, IAS
  - J. Sundar Sekhar, IAS
  - T. A. Ambedkar, IAS
  - M. Babu Rao, IPS
  - B. Maria Kumar, IPS
  - K. Babu Rao, IPS
  - K. S. Anupam, IPS
  - Chandragiri Yesuratnam, IPS
- Literature
  - Jandhyala Papayya Sastry, poet who wrote Pushpa Vilapam
  - C.V.N. Dhan
- Politics
  - Paturi Rajagopala Naidu
  - Bhavanam Venkatarami Reddy
  - Kasu Brahmananda Reddy
  - N. G. Ranga
  - N. T. Rama Rao
  - S. V. L. Narasimham
  - Kotha Raghuramaiah
  - Jesudasu Seelam
  - Yadlapati Venkata Rao
  - Pinneli Ramakrishna Reddy
  - Dr. Kodela Siva Prasad
  - J. R. Pushpa Raj
  - Alapati Rajendra Prasad
  - Nakka Ananda Babu
  - K. S. Jawahar

== In film ==
- Pilla Zamindar, a Telugu film, was filmed at the college. It was named Mangamma Memorial College in the movie.
- Chalo a Telugu film, starring Naga Shaurya and Rashmika Mandanna, was filmed in the college. It was named as KGN college in the movie.
- Brochevarevarura, a Telugu film, starring Sree Vishnu and Nivetha Thomas, shot here
