= Sitanagaram =

Neighbourhood in Andhra Pradesh, India

Sitanagaram is a southern neighbourhood of Vijayawada and an ancient site located in the District of Guntur in East-Coast part of India. It is 18 miles north of Guntur on the bank of River Krishna and Indrakeeladri. The place is related to the ancient history of Ramayana during the last Treta Yuga (Traditional time scale: 1.6 million years ago).

== Introduction ==
It is on the bank of River Krishna with a vast sandy beach for recreation and leisure. The famous Someswara Swamy temple is situated here. According to the legend Lord Rama wept here for Sita when she was abducted by Ravana, hence the name.

== Access ==
Sitanagaram comes under the Tadepalle mandal, Guntur district of Andhra Pradesh. It is 1 km from Vijayawada on the Guntur side of the Prakasam barrage under Sitanagaram police station limits.
