= Kotha Raghuramaiah =

Indian politician (1912–1979)

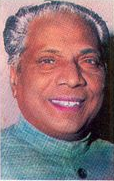

Minister of Tourism & Civil Aviation
- In office 23 December 1976 – 24 March 1977
- Prime Minister: Indira Gandhi
- Preceded by: Raj Bahadur
- Succeeded by: Purushottam Kaushik

Minister of Parliamentary Affairs
- In office 5 February 1973 – 24 March 1977
- Prime Minister: Indira Gandhi
- In office 14 February 1969 – 18 March 1971
- Prime Minister: Indira Gandhi

Minister of Works and Housing
- In office 10 October 1974 – 23 December 1976
- Prime Minister: Indira Gandhi

Minister of Supply and Rehabilitation
- In office 1 February 1975 – 21 December 1975
- Prime Minister: Indira Gandhi

Minister of Shipping and Transport
- In office 14 February 1969 – 18 March 1971
- Prime Minister: Indira Gandhi

Minister of Social Welfare
- In office 24 January 1966 – 25 March 1966
- Prime Minister: Indira Gandhi

Member of Parliament, Lok Sabha
- In office 1957–1980
- Preceded by: S. V. L. Narasimham
- Succeeded by: N. G. Ranga
- Constituency: Guntur
- In office 1952–1957
- Preceded by: First General Election
- Succeeded by: N. G. Ranga
- Constituency: Tenali

Personal details
- Born: 6 August 1912 Sangamjagarlamudi, Guntur district, Madras Presidency, British India (now Andhra Pradesh)
- Died: 6 June 1979 (aged 66) New Delhi, India
- Party: Indian National Congress

Kotha Raghuramaiah (1912–1979) was a veteran Indian politician and barrister who served as the Union Cabinet minister of Defence, Civil Aviation, Petroleum & Chemicals, Tourism and Parliamentary Affairs. He is one of the longest-serving cabinet ministers in the history of India. The Members of Parliament from the Lok sabha and Rajya Sabha participate in a friendly Cricket competition annually for the honor of lifting the Raghuramaiah Trophy named after him.

== Family ==
Raghuramaiah was born on 6 August 1912 to Kotha Jagannadham and Kotamma in Sangam Jagarlamudi in Guntur district of Andhra Pradesh, South India. He had two brothers and six sisters. He married Suguna Jampala in 1936. Later, he was married to Lakshmi Raghuramaiah, a prominent scholar-activist in the cause of women upliftment in India on 3 July 1937.

== Education ==
Raghuramaiah was educated at Andhra Christian College, Guntur and Lucknow University. He studied Bar-at-Law from Middle Temple in United Kingdom. He was awarded gold medal in the All India Inter-University Oratorical Contest (English) held at Lucknow, 1932–33. He was conferred Doctorate Degrees by Andhra University in 1975 and by Sri Venkateswara University, Tirupati in January 1977.

== Career ==
Raghuramaiah joined Government of India service as Deputy Secretary in the Department of Law. He relinquished the job to enter active politics in 1949. He was elected to the Indian Parliament from Tenali and Guntur. He served as a Union cabinet minister of Defence, Civil Supplies, Petroleum and Chemicals and Parliamentary Affairs.

- Practiced Law in Madras High Court, 1937–1941
- Joined Provincial Judicial Service in 1941; between 1941 and 1951, held various posts like:
- Assistant Secretary, Legal Department, Government of Madras – 1941.
- Assistant Director of Employment and Regional Publicity Officer (Madras) in the Resettlement Directorate of the Ministry of Labour, Government of India.
- Assistant Solicitor to the Government of India, Ministry of Law.
- Deputy Secretary and Joint Secretary, Legal Department, Government of Madras
- Legal Secretary and Legal Remembrancer to the Government of Madras.
- Reesignation from Government service in 1951.
- Enrolled as an Advocate of the Supreme Court.
- Editor, 'Asian Recorder', 1955.
- Member, AICC, 1955–59.
- Legal Advisory Committee, AICC, 1956.
- Secretary, Harijan Sevak Sangh, Madras.
- Vice-president, Madras Corporation Labour Union prior to 1942.
- Member, Executive Committee, Indian Institute of Public Administration, 1954.
- Member, Railway Corruption Enquiry Committee, 1954.
- President, P.& T. Workers' Union (Andhra Circle), 1954.
- President, Andhra Pradesh Life Insurance Salaried Officers Association, 1954.
- President, All-India Postal Employees' Union, Class III, Andhra Circle, 1956.
- President, All-India R.M.S. Employees Union, Class IV, Andhra Circle, 1956.
- Member, First Lok Sabha, 1952–57, Second Lok Sabha, 1957–62, Third Lok Sabha, 1962–67, Fourth Lok Sabha 1967–70 and Fifth Lok Sabha 1971–77.
- Member, Executive Committee, Congress Party in Parliament – 1954.
- Secretary, Executive Committee, Congress Party in Parliament – 1955.
- Convener, External Affairs Standing Committee, 1952–57.
- Member, Estimates Committee 1954.
- Member, General Purposes Committee and Rules Committee, 1955–57.
- Chairman, Petitions Committee, 1955–57.
- Deputy Minister of Defence, May 1957.
- Minister of State for Defence on 16 April 1962.
- Minister of Defence Production on 14 November 1962.
- Minister of State in the Ministry of Labour & Employment on 9 June 1964.
- Minister of Supply in the Ministry of; Industry and Supply on 13 June 1964.
- Minister of Supply and Technical Development on 3 October 1964.
- Minister of State in the Ministry of Law on 13 March 1967.
- Minister of State in the Ministry of Petroleum and Chemicals and of Planning and Social Welfare on 13 March 1967.
- Minister of State in the Ministry of Petroleum and Chemicals and of Social Welfare on 5 September 1967.
- Minister of Petroleum and Chemicals on 23 August 1968.
- Minister of Parliamentary Affairs and Shipping and Transport on 14 February 1969.
- Cabinet Minister of Parliamentary Affairs and Shipping and Transport 26 June 1970 – March 1971.
- Cabinet Minister of Parliamentary Affairs in February 1973.
- Additional charge of Ministry of Works and Housing in October 1974.
- Minister of Works & Housing and Parliamentary Affairs.
- Minister of Tourism & Civil Aviation and Parliamentary Affairs in December 1976.
- Chairman, Government of India Tobacco Delegation to Far East, 1954 and Tobacco Export Committee, 1956–57.
- Member, Indian Central Tobacco Committee, 1953–57.
- Vice-president from 1955 to 1956; Alternate Delegate to the Trusteeship Committee of the United Nations, 1956.
- India's Representative in the U.N. Committee on Information from, Non-Self Governing Territories, 1956.
- Alternate Delegate to the U.N. General Assembly, 1956.
- Member, Executive Committee of the Indian Parliamentary Group, 1955–57.
- Member, "Law of the Sea" Conference, Geneva, April 1960.
- delegate to the International Parliamentary Council Meeting at Nice (France) in 1957 and at Dubrovnik (Yugoslavia) in 1966.
- Represented Government of India at the function, of the assumption of office by the President of Philippines in December 1969.
- Leader of the Indian delegation at the International Highway Conference held at Montreal in 1970.
- Member, Indian Parliamentary delegation to USA in 1970.
- Attended Colombo Housing Ministers Conference at Sri Lanka in 1975.
- Leader of Indian Delegation to the 21st Commonwealth Parliamentary Conference held in New Delhi in 1975.
- Leader of the Indian Delegation to the U.N. Conference on Habitat held in Vancouver in June 1976.
- Leader of the Indian Delegation to the 22nd Commonwealth Parliamentary Conference held in Mauritius in September 1976.

== Honours ==
Raghuramaiah served the Indian Parliament for three decades from 1952 to 1979. He died on 6 June 1979.

- Andhra University conferred Doctorate Degree in 1975.
- Sri Venkateswara University conferred Doctorate Degree in 1977.
- Two colleges in the towns of Narasaraopeta and Duggirala in Guntur district were named in his honour.
