= Lemalle =

- Village
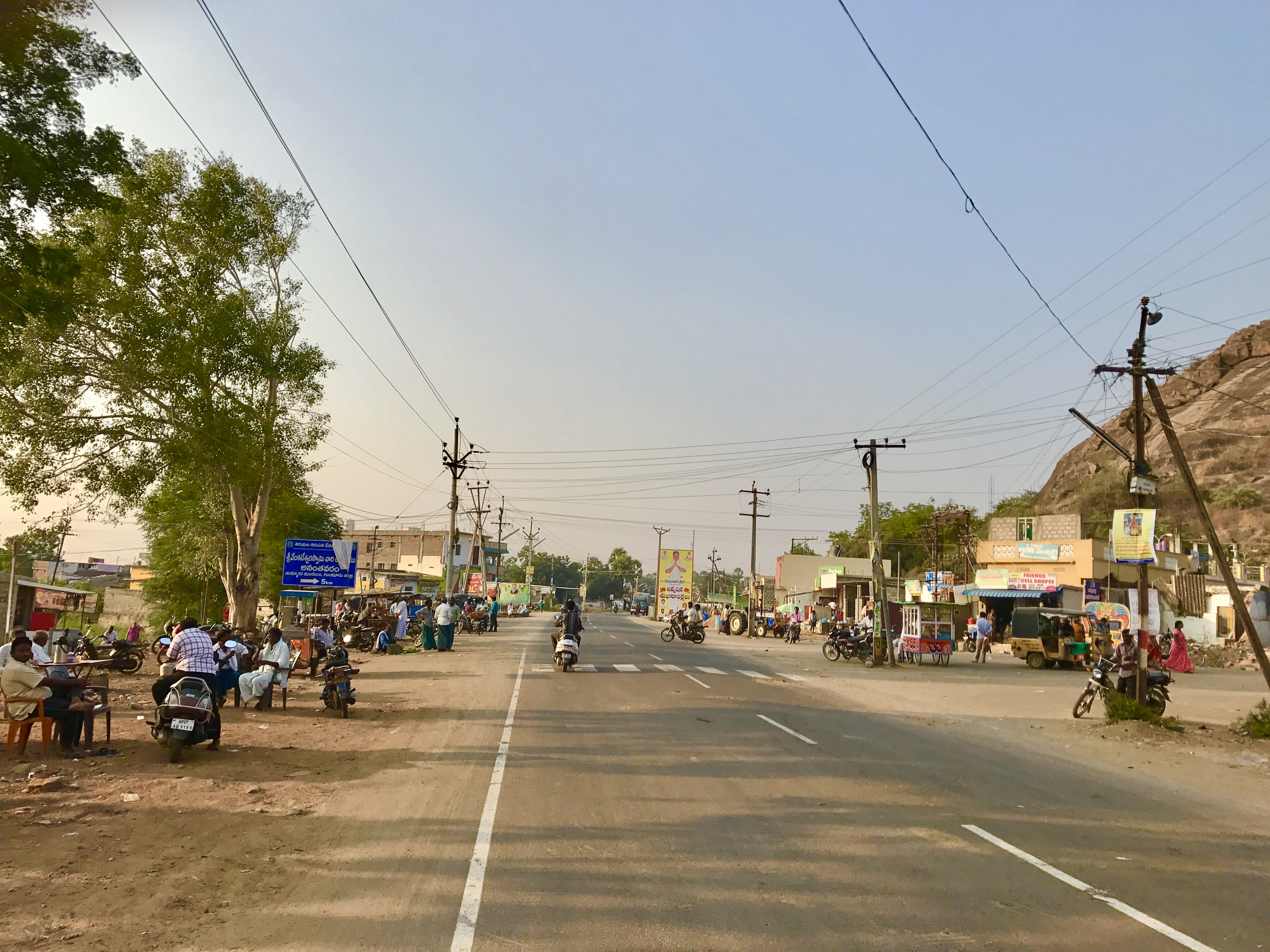
- Amaravathi Road in Village
- Interactive map of Lemalle
- Location in Andhra Pradesh, India Lemalle (India)
- Coordinates: 16°29′35″N 80°23′20″E
- Country: India
- State: Andhra Pradesh
- District: Palnadu

Languages
  - Official: Telugu
- Time zone: UTC+5:30 (IST)
- PIN: 522016
- Telephone code: 08645
- Nearest city: Guntur
- Lok Sabha constituency: Narasaraopet
- Vidhan Sabha constituency: Pedakurapadu

Lemalle is a village in Palnadu district, Andhra Pradesh, India on the way to Amaravati from Guntur. 14th Mile is also part of Lemalle grama panchayat and commercial area of this village.

== Geography ==
Lemalle is 10.5 km far from its Mandal main town Amaravathi and 21.8 km distance from its District main city Guntur.

Nearby villages include Karlapudi(1.5 km), Endroy (2.5 km), Mothadaka (3.2 km), Unguturu (3.3 km), and Nekkallu (3.9 km). Nearby towns include Thullur(9.6 km), Amaravathi(10.5 km), Tadikonda(10.6 km), and Pedakurapadu(15.1 km).

== Communication ==
Lemalle Pin Code is 522016 and Post office name is Lemalle. BSNL Telephone Exchange and CellOne mobile phone towers are there in this village.

== Education ==
The Government Elementary School offers primary education. Sri Rama High School (located in between 14th mile and Motadaka village) offers high school education. In addition to these Govt. schools, Venus Public school located at 14th mile offers primary and secondary education.

== Places of worship ==
Sivalayam is the biggest Hindu temple in this village. Raamalayam, Aanjaneyaswami Gudi, Sri Lakshmi Tirupatamma Ammavaari temples are other Hindu temples. There is also a mosque and a church in this village.

== Transport ==
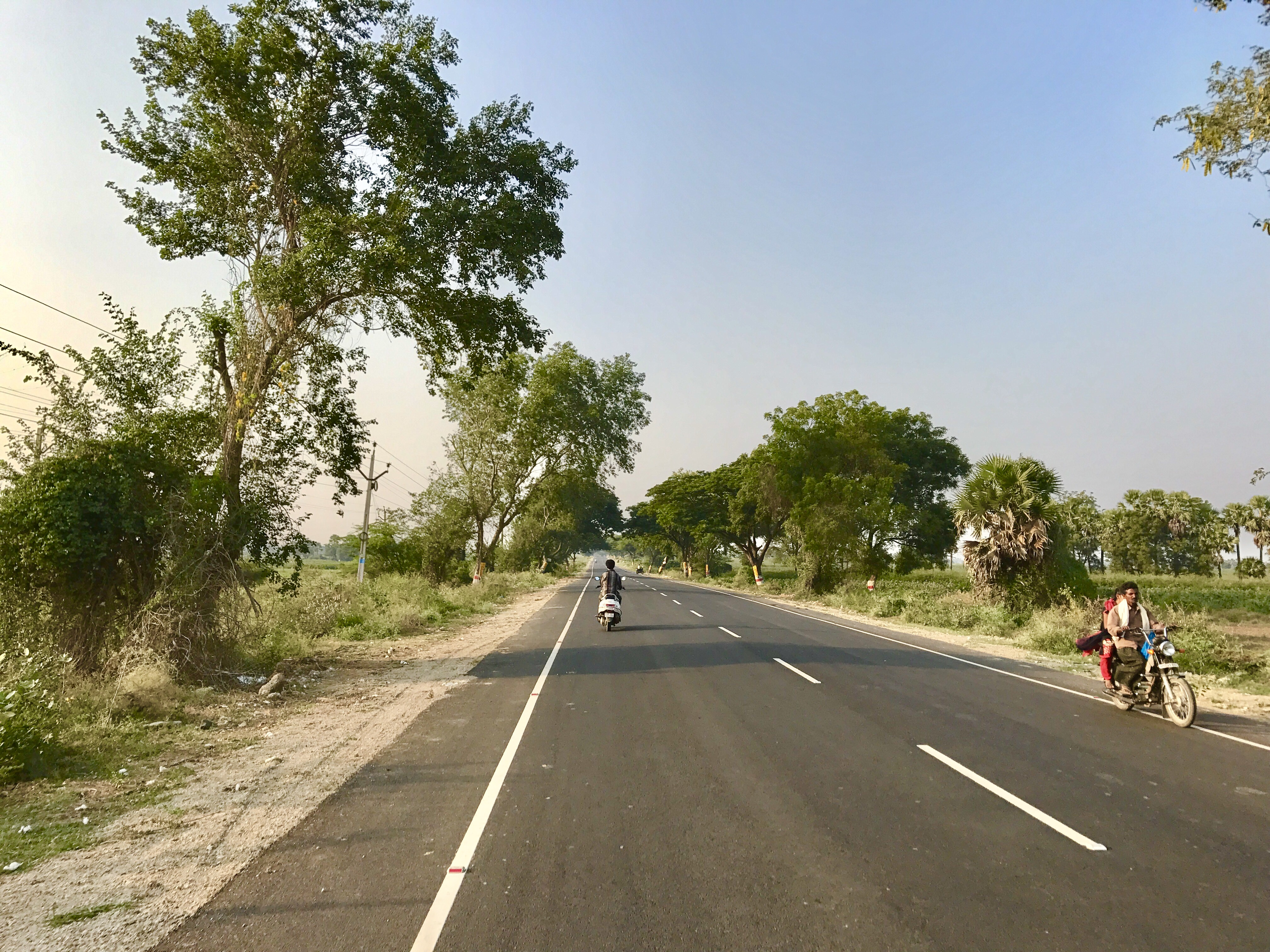
Amaravathi Road at Lemalle

Lemalle lies on Amaravathi Road. APS RTC runs bus services from NTR bus station, Guntur and Amaravathi to here.
