= Loyola Public School =

Private school in Andhra Pradesh, India

Location
- Nallapadu outside Guntur, Andhra Pradesh; India; 16°18′22″N 80°22′10″E

Information
- Type: Private primary and secondary school
- Motto: Latin: Natus Ad Majora (Born for Greater Things)
- Religious affiliation: Catholicism
- Denomination: Jesuits
- Established: 1964; 62 years ago
- Status: Active
- President: Rev. Fr. P.S. Amalraj, S.J.
- Principal: Fr. Suresh B. Kumar, S.J.(2022-present)
- Staff: 108
- Grades: 1 – 12
- Gender: Coed (boys only hostel)
- Enrolment: 75,000 (till date)
- Campus: The "Old" Block, The Golden Jubilee Block, The Primary School Block.
- Houses: Stanislaus Kostka; John de Britto; Francis Xavier; Edmund Campion
- Colour
- Accreditation: To the CISCE. For ICSE and ISC
- Alumni Pres.: G.V.S.R. Krishna Reddy
- Founder: Rev.Fr. Y. Papaiah.SJ
- Website: loyolapublicschool.org

The Loyola Public School is a private Catholic primary and secondary school located in the village of Nallapadu outside Guntur in the state of Andhra Pradesh, India. Established by the Jesuits in 1964, the school follows the ICSE curriculum till class 10 and the ISC for class 11 and 12. The school's motto is Natus Ad Majora ("Born for Greater Things").

== History ==
Loyola School is managed and administered by members of the Society of Jesus (Jesuits). a worldwide organization of religious men numbering about 16,000 of whom 3,000 work in the 14 provinces of India. In Andhra Pradesh about 160 Jesuits work in schools and colleges, youth services, social work centres, parishes, mission out-reach programmes, and other Church ministries. In presecondary and secondary education alone, in South Asia, 820 Jesuits run 447 schools with a student population of 344,000.

Two names will go down in history as pioneers of Loyola Public School, Guntur. Late Rt. Rev. Ignatius Mummadi, Bishop of Guntur, Catholic Diocese brought the Jesuits to Guntur to start the school. He mustered the services of Fr. T. Balaiah, S.J., to acquire the land. Commissioned to go ahead with the project, Jesuit Fr. Papaiah, the pioneer and chief architect of the school, made Loyola Public School a reality with the help of a Jesuit brother, Stanislaus. The foundation stone of this second Jesuit educational institution in Andhra Pradesh was laid on 30 January 1964 by the Chief Minister of the State Dr. N. Sanjeeva Reddy. Fr. L.D. Murphy, S.J., became the first principal of the school which opened on 13 July 1964 with 13 boys.

== Academics - ICSE ==
As mentioned previously, the school follows the ICSE and ISC curriculum. That includes mandatory classes and board exams in English language and literature, Physics, Chemistry and Biology. Mathematics, History-Civics and Geography, one optional subject and one 2nd language for the ICSE. Loyola Public School offers Computer Applications as the optional and a choice between Hindi and Telugu for the 2nd language.

Lectures for the above subjects are delivered throughout the year, providing a comprehensive understanding of the subjects and thorough preparation for the board exam. The school has consistently achieved a 100% result (all students who attempt the exam exceed the set pass mark, i.e., 35%) for decades.

The school has a progressive teaching approach using smart learning tools when required. The learning is concept-based instead of rote memorisation. The School has a strict 'English conversation only' policy for students and staff on campus. Physics, Chemistry and Biology are taught with practical application. The separate labs for each science aid this approach to teaching. The school also has several computer labs and English language labs.

== Co-Curricular and Extra-Curricular Activities ==
Although LPS is highly focused on academics, it believes in the holistic growth of students.

=== Sports- ===
The school has football and hockey fields, a cricket field, clay and synthetic courts for basketball, volleyball and badminton, a synthetic tennis court, a swimming pool, and indoor facilities for table tennis.

=== The NCC ===
The school has an army wing troop with 150 cadets on its roll. Boys and girls of classes 8 and 9 join the National Cadet Corps (India). Boys are enrolled under the 25 (A) Bn NCC, Guntur, and girls are enrolled under 10 (A) Bn NCC, Guntur.

There is an active alumni club, with Mr. GVSR Krishna Reddy as president and Fr. U. Antony, S.J., as director.

== See also ==
- List of Jesuit schools
