= Guntur–Amaravathi Road =

Arterial road in Guntur, Andhra Pradesh, India

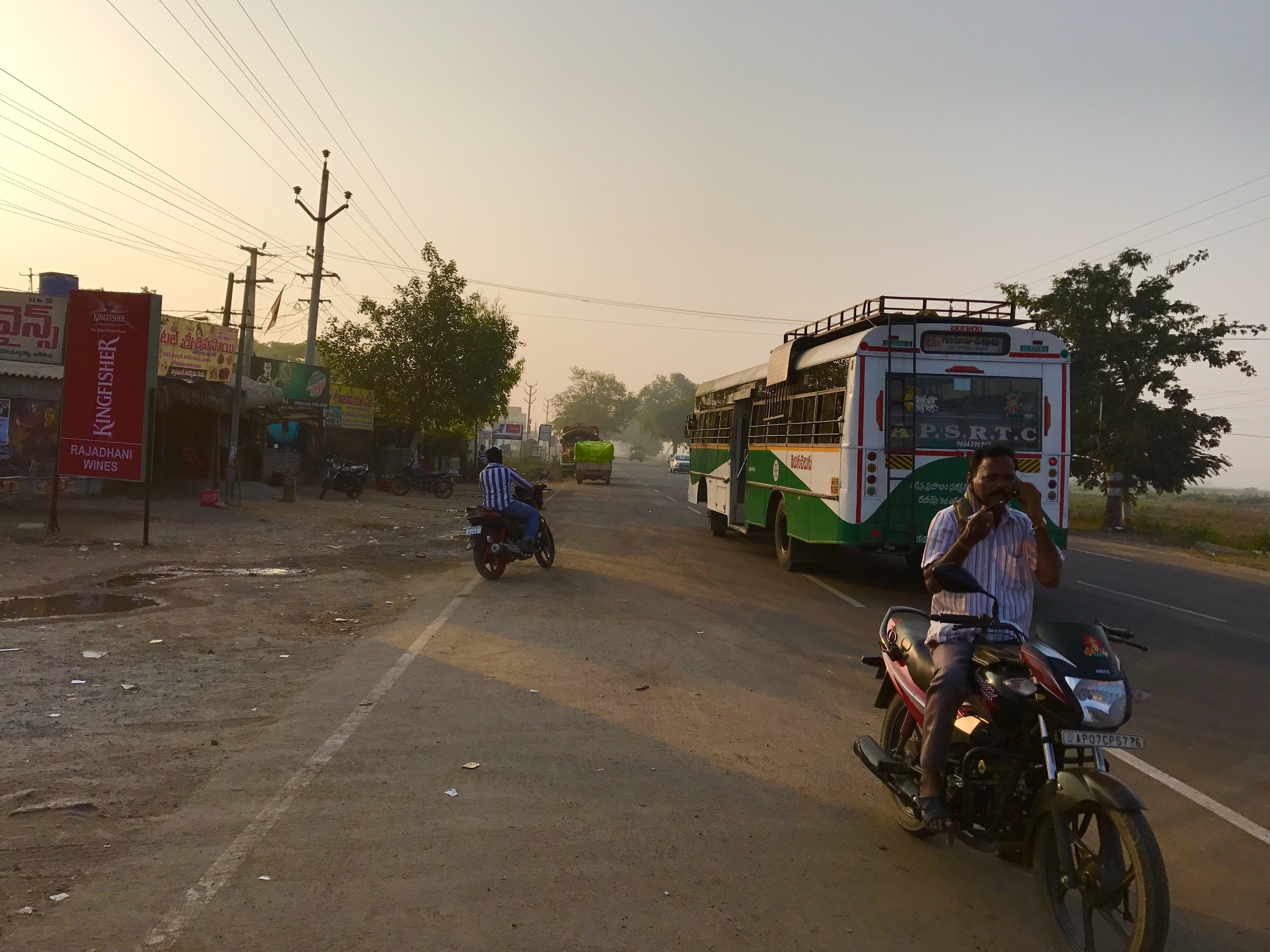

Route information
- Length: 33 km (21 mi)

Major junctions
- From: Brodipet
- Guntur Inner Ringroad near Gorantla
- To: Amaravathi

Location
- Country: India
- States: Andhra Pradesh

Highway system
- Roads in India; Expressways; National; State; Asian

Guntur–Amaravathi Road is a major arterial road in the Indian city of Guntur. The road starts at Brodipet on Guntur and stretches towards Amaravathi. It has a total length of 33 km (21 mi). Government of Andhra Pradesh proposed to make it as State Highway.

Guntur to Amaravathi Road will be Four Lane Shortly. Andhra Pradesh government is all geared up to widen the narrow single lane road between Tadikonda and Thullur to a four lane highway.
