= Inner Ring Road, Guntur =

Freeway of Guntur in Andhra Pradesh, India

Route information
- Maintained by Guntur Municipal Corporation, APCRDA
- Length: 6.34 km (3.94 mi)

Location
- Country: India
- State: Andhra Pradesh

Highway system
- Roads in India; Expressways; National; State; Asian; State Highways in Andhra Pradesh

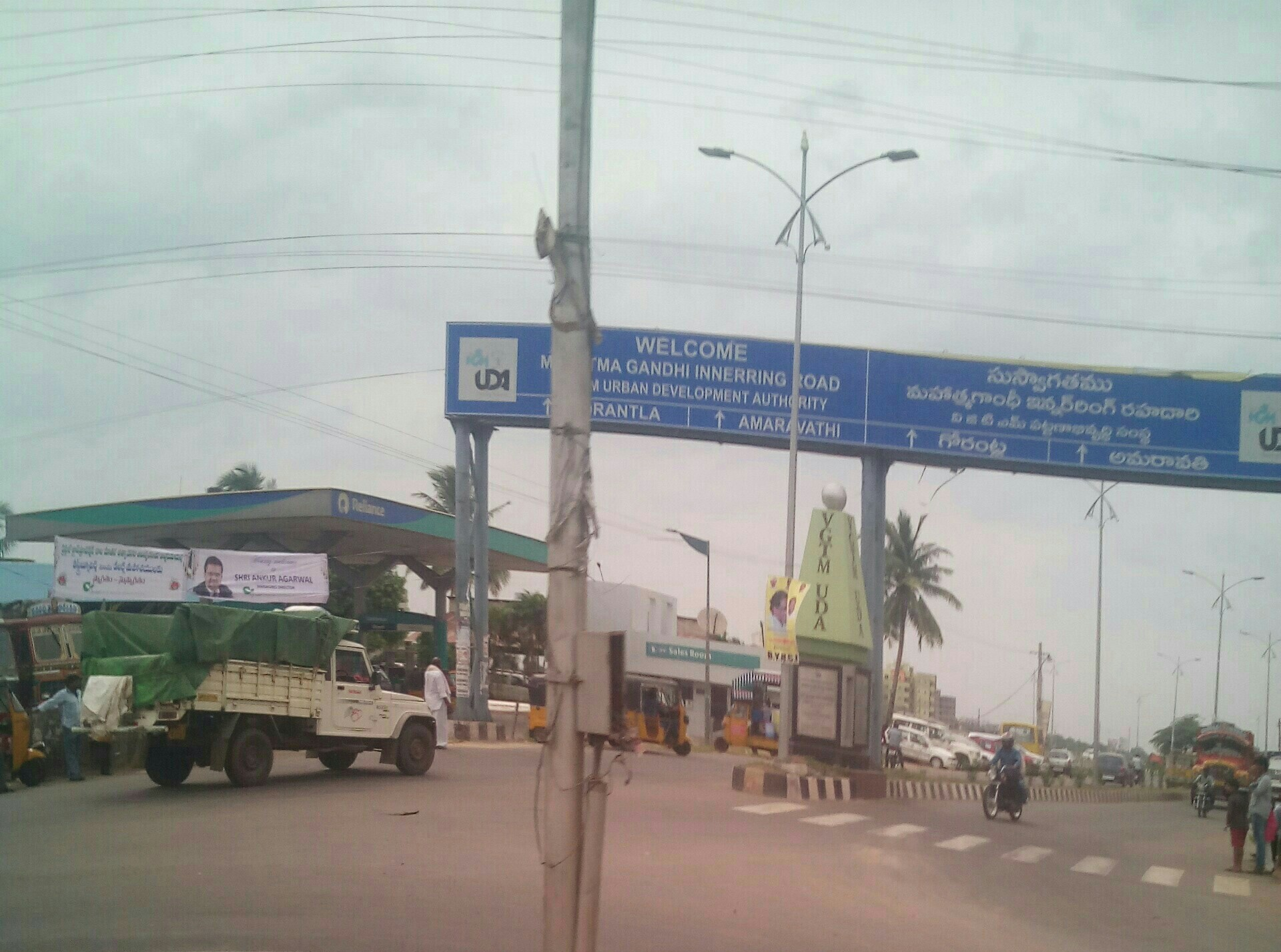
Guntur Mahatma Gandhi Inner Ring Road

The Inner Ring Road, officially Mahatma Gandhi Inner Ring Road, is a ring road freeway of Guntur in the Indian state of Andhra Pradesh. It stretches to 6.34 km (3.94 mi) in length and was laid at a cost of ₹ 29.08 crores. The project includes two phases and was taken up by the then, VGTM Urban Development Authority (now APCRDA).

== Route ==
The route of the road starts at Autonagar area of the city at National Highway 5 and ends after encircling the city at Ankireddypalem on the same National Highway. The areas which it covers in the stretch are, Agathavarappadu, Gorantla, JKC college Road, Peda Palakaluru, Turakapalem, Nallapadu.
