= Chinapalakaluru =

- Village
- Location in Andhra Pradesh, India
- Coordinates: 16.3330°N 80.3805°E
- Country: India
- State: Andhra Pradesh
- District: Guntur
- Mandal: Guntur West

Government
  - Type: Panchayati raj
  - Body: Chinapalakaluru gram panchayat

Area
  - Total: 1,042 ha (2,570 acres)

Population (2011)
  - Total: 4,488
  - Density: 430.7/km^{2} (1,116/sq mi)

Languages
  - Official: Telugu
- Time zone: UTC+5:30 (IST)
- PIN: 522619
- Area code: +91–8647
- Vehicle registration: AP

Chinapalakaluru is a village in Guntur district of the Indian state of Andhra Pradesh. It is located in Guntur West mandal (formerly Guntur mandal) of Guntur revenue division.

== Geography ==
Chinapalakaluru is situated to the northwest of the district headquarters, Guntur, at 16.3330°N 80.3805°E. It is spread over an area of 1,042 ha (2,570 acres).

== Governance ==
Chinapalakaluru gram panchayat is the local self-government of the village. It is divided into wards and each ward is represented by a ward member. The village forms a part of Andhra Pradesh Capital Region and is under the jurisdiction of APCRDA.

== Education ==
As per the school information report for the academic year 2018–19, the village has only one Mandal Parishad school.

== See also ==
- List of villages in Guntur district
