= Ankireddipalem =

Akkireddipalem
- Neighborhood
- Interactive map of Akkireddipalem
- Location in Andhra Pradesh, India Akkireddipalem (India)
- Coordinates: 16.17202°N 80.23316°E
- Country: India
- State: Andhra Pradesh
- District: Guntur
- Mandal: Guntur mandal

Area
  - Total: 4.12 km^{2} (1.59 sq mi)
- Elevation: 23 m (75 ft)

Population (2021)
  - Total: 27,152
  - Density: 6,590/km^{2} (17,100/sq mi)

Languages
  - Official: Telugu
- Time zone: UTC+05:30 (IST)
- Postal code: 522 005

Ankireddypalem is a neighbourhood of Guntur in the Indian state of Andhra Pradesh. It was merged in Guntur Municipal Corporation in 2012 and is a part of Guntur West mandal (formerly Guntur mandal).

== Demographics ==
As of 2011 Census of India, Ankireddipalem has population of 22256 of which 11464 are males while 10792 are females. Average Sex Ratio of Ankireddipalem village is 941. Population of children with age 0-6 is 2298 which makes up 10.33% of total population of village. Child Sex Ratio for the Ankireddipalem as per census is 974. Literacy rate of Ankireddipalem village was 72.39% com.

== See also ==
- Villages in Guntur mandal
