= Indian Overseas Bank =

An Indian public sector bank

- Logo of the Bank

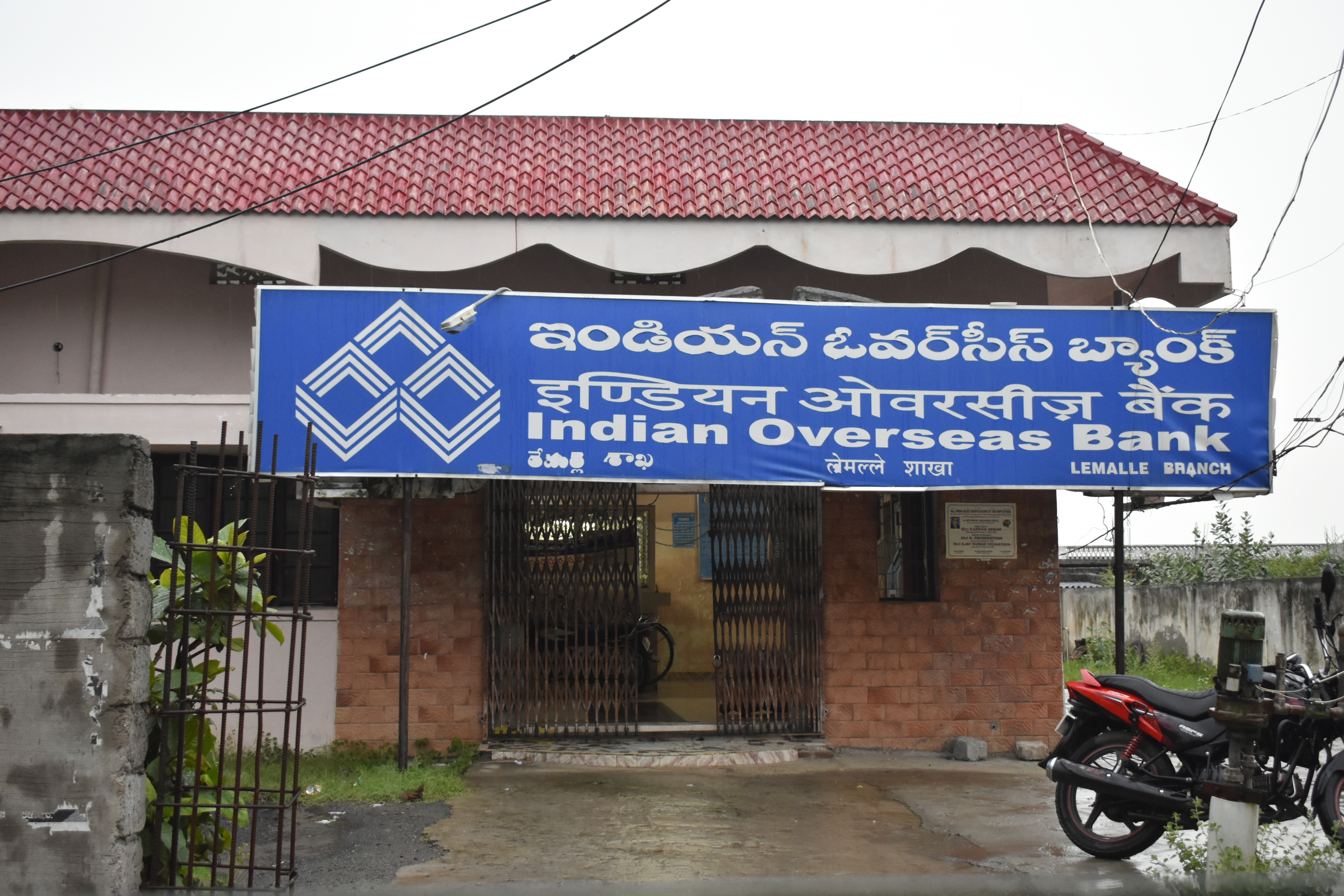
- An Indian Overseas Bank branch in Lemalle, Andhra Pradesh
- Type: Public
- Traded as: BSE: 532388; NSE: IOB
- Industry: Banking, Financial services
- Founded: 10 February 1937; 89 years ago
- Founder: M. Ct. M. Chidambaram Chettiar
- Headquarters: Chennai, Tamil Nadu, India
- Number of locations: 3925
- Key people: Ajay Kumar Srivastava (MD & CEO)
- Products: Financial services Consumer Banking; Retail banking Corporate Banking; Commercial bank Housing Loan; Vehicle Loan; Investment banking Merchant bank Education Loan; Private banking Savings wealth management Credit card
- Revenue: ▲₹29,705.99 crore (US$3.1 billion) (2024)
- Operating income: ▲₹6,773.90 crore (US$700 million) (2024)
- Net income: ▲₹3,338 crore (US$350 million) (2025)
- Total assets: ▲₹395,014.94 crore (US$41 billion) (2025)
- Owner: Government of India (94.61%)
- Number of employees: 20,966 (2025)
- Capital ratio: 17.28 (2024)
- Website: www.iob.bank.in

Indian Overseas Bank (IOB) is an Indian public sector bank based in Chennai. It was founded in February 1937 by M. Ct. M. Chidambaram Chettiar, and was one of the 14 major banks taken over by the government of India during the nationalisation in 1969.

IOB has about 3,269 domestic branches, 2 DBUs (Digital Banking Unit) about 4 foreign branches and representative offices.

== History ==
=== Pre-World War II ===
In 1937, M. Ct. M. Chidambaram Chettiar established the Indian Overseas Bank to encourage overseas banking and foreign exchange operations. IOB started up simultaneously at three branches, one each in Karaikudi, Madras, and Rangoon (Yangon). It quickly opened a branch in Penang, Kuala Lumpur (1937 or 1938), and another in Singapore (1937 or 1941). The bank served the Nattukottai Chettiars, who were a mercantile class that at the time had spread from Chettinad in Tamil Nadu state to Ceylon (Sri Lanka), Burma (Myanmar), Malaya, Singapore, Java, Sumatra, and Saigon. As a result, from the beginning IOB specialised in foreign exchange and overseas banking (see below). Due to the war, IOB lost its branches in Rangoon and Penang, and Singapore, though the branch in Singapore resumed operations in 1942 under Japanese supervision.

=== After World War II ===
In 1945 or 1946 IOB opened a branch in Colombo. In 1947, IOB opened a branch in Bangkok. Then IOB added a branch each in Ipoh, Klang, and Malacca, all in Malaya. Some years later, in 1955, IOB opened its first branch in Hong Kong. Others would follow.

In 1963, the revolutionary government in Burma nationalised Indian Overseas Bank's branches in Rangoon, Mandalay, and Moulmein, which became People's Bank No. 4.

In the 1960s, the banking sector in India was consolidating through the merger of weak private sector banks with stronger ones. IOB acquired a number of local banks: Coimbatore Standard Bank (acq. 1963; one branch at Madras), Nanjinnad Bank (or Nanjanad Bank), Coimbatore Vasunthara Bank (or Coimbatore Vasundara Bank; est. June 1924; Head office and three branches; acq. 1964), Kulitalai Bank (est. 1933; acq. 1964; six branches), Srinivasa Perumal Bank (est. November 1935 at Coimbatore; acq. 1966), and (Sri/Lord) Venkateswara Bank (est. June 1931 as Salem Shevapet Sri Venkateswara Bank; acq. 1967; two branches in Salem, Tamil Nadu).

Then in 1969, the Government of India nationalized IOB. At one point, probably before nationalization, IOB had twenty of its eighty branches located overseas. However, Malaysian law forbade foreign government ownership of banks in Malaysia. After nationalization Indian Overseas Bank, like all the nationalized banks, turned inward, emphasizing the opening of branches in rural India.

In 1973, IOB, Indian Bank, and United Commercial Bank established United Asian Bank Berhad in Malaysia. (Indian Bank had been operating in Malaysia since 1941 and United Commercial Bank had been operating there since 1948.) The banks set up United Asian to comply with the Banking Law in Malaysia, which prohibited foreign government banks from operating in the country. Each contributed their operations in Malaysia to the new joint-venture bank, with each of the three-parent banks owning a third of the shares. At the time, Indian Bank had three branches, and Indian Overseas Bank and United Commercial Bank had eight between them. Also, IOB and six Indian private banks established Bharat Overseas Bank as a Chennai-based private bank to take over IOB's Bangkok branch.

In 1977, IOB opened a branch in Seoul. It also opened a branch in Tsim Sha Tsui, Kowloon, Hong Kong. Two years later, IOB opened a foreign currency banking unit in Colombo, Sri Lanka.

In 1983, ethnic sectarian violence in the form of anti-Tamil riots resulted in the burning of IOB's branch in Colombo. Indian Bank, which may have had stronger ties to the Sinhalese population, escaped unscathed.

In 1988–89, IOB acquired Bank of Tamil Nadu, and its 99 branches, in a rescue. Bank of Tamil Nadu (or Bank of Tamilnad), had been established in 1903 in Tirunelveli as the South India Bank.

In 1992, Bank of Commerce (BOC), a Malaysian bank, acquired United Asian Bank (UAB).

=== The new millennium ===
In 2000, IOB engaged in an initial public offering (IPO) that brought the government's share in the bank's equity down to 75%. In 2001 IOB acquired the Mumbai-based Adarsha Janata Sahakari Bank, which gave it a branch in Mumbai. Then in 2009 IOB took over Shree Suvarna Sahakari Bank, which was founded in 1969 and had its head office in Pune. Shree Suvarna Sahakari Bank had been in administration since 2006. It had nine branches in Pune, two in Mumbai and one in Shirpur. The total employee strength was estimated to be little over 100.

IOB opened an extension counter at New Kathiresan Temple complex, Bambalapitiya, Sri Lanka, on 29 August 2003.

In 2005 IOB opened a representative office in Guangzhou, China. The next year IOB opened another representative office, this time in Kuala Lumpur. In 2009 IOB opened a Representative office in Dubai, United Arab Emirates.

In the new millennium, international expansion picked up once again. In 2007, IOB took over Bharat Overseas Bank. Then in 2009 IOB acquired Pune-based Shree Suvarna Sahakari Bank, which had been established in 1969; the bank had nine branches in Pune, two in Mumbai, and one in Shripur.

In 2010 Malaysia awarded a commercial banking license to a locally incorporated bank to be jointly owned by Bank of Baroda, Indian Overseas Bank and Andhra Bank. The new bank, India International Bank (Malaysia), commenced operations in 2012 in Kuala Lumpur, which has a large population of Indians. Andhra Bank holds a 25% stake in the joint-venture, Bank of Baroda owns 40%, and IOB the remaining 35%.

IOB opened an Offshore Banking Unit in Colombo, Sri Lanka, on 31 August 2013. The bank also upgraded its existing Extension Counter at Bambalapitiya into a full-fledged branch.

As of March-2024, IOB has 3236 branches, 3506 ATMs and 6379 business correspondents across the country.

== Timeline ==
- 1957 – Bank established its own training center
- 1964 – Inauguration of IOB's Head Office in Mount Road.
- 1969 - Nationalisation of the bank
- 1974 – Official Language Department established in 1974
- 1984 – 1000th branch opened
- 1991 – Bank moved its Staff College premises to a learning zone at Koyambedu
- 1996 – Banks profit reached INR 100 cr. for the first time i.e. USD16.69Mn [1USD=Rs. 59.9150]
- 2000 – Initial Public Offer. Follow on Public Offer in 2003. The first public sector bank to introduce anywhere banking at its 129 branches in the four metros, is extending the connectivity to another 100 branches in Hyderabad, Bangalore, Ahmedabad and Ludhiana. The first public sector bank in the country to introduce mobile banking services using the Wireless Application Protocol (WAP).
- 2005 – Launched Debit Card
- 2006 – Launched VISA Card, Retail Sale of Gold and Non-Life Joint Insurance Bank reached INR 1 lac crore mark in Total Business
- 2006 – 07 Net Profit reached INR 1000 Cr.(US$229.78 Mn) [1USD= Rs. 43.5200] Bharat Overseas Bank Ltd. Was merged with IOB and First Offsite ATM at Kamatchi Hospital, Chennai
- 2009 – 100% CBS
- 2010 – 2000th Branch -Yamuna Vihar, New Delhi-opened
- 2011-12 – No. of Branches in Tamil Nadu reached 1000, and IOB celebrated Platinum Jubilee 2012–13. As on 31.3.2013, total deposits reached INR 202,135 cr. (US$37,236Mn.) [1USD =Rs. 54.2850]As on 31.3.2013, Total Advances reached INR 164,366cr. (US$30,278 Mn.) As on 31.3.2013, Total Business Mix is at INR 366,501cr. (US$67,514Mn.), Total No. of Branches 2908
- 2014-15 Bank has surpassed the landmark of 3000 ATMs as on 31.07.2014 – Tirumalaipatti Branch
- 2015 – IOB launched new Mobile Banking, m Passbook applications.
- 2015-IOB started migration from its in-house CBS platform to Finacle.
- January 2016- All branches migrated from in house CBS platform "CROWN" to FINACLE.
- February 2024- On Friday, February 2, 2024, Indian Overseas Bank (IOB) reached a noteworthy milestone by being the fifth public sector lender to reach ₹1 lakh crore in market capitalization.

== See also ==
- Banking in India
- List of banks in India
- Reserve Bank of India
- Indian Financial System Code
- List of largest banks
- List of companies of India
- Make in India
