= RVR & JC College of Engineering =

Autonomous engineering college in Guntur, Andhra Pradesh, India

R. V. R. & J. C. College of Engineering
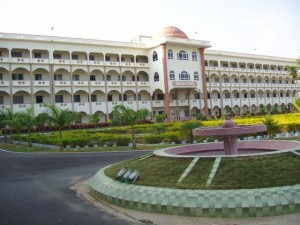
- Motto: Knowledge is Power
- Type: Private Engineering College
- Established: 1985
- Academic affiliations: Acharya Nagarjuna University
- President: Srinivas Rayapati
- Principal: Kolla Srinivas
- Faculty: 271
- Administrative staff: 249
- Students: 5,551
- Undergraduates: 4,751
- Postgraduates: 800
- Location: Chowdavaram, Guntur, Andhra Pradesh, India; 16.25553°N 80.32377°E
- Campus: Urban (Main campus) 37.4 acres (15.1 ha)
- Website: www.rvrjcce.ac.in

R. V. R. & J. C. College of Engineering (Rayapati Venkata Rangarao & Jagarlamudi Chandramouli) is an autonomous engineering college in Guntur, Andhra Pradesh, India. The College offers graduate and undergraduate education courses in Engineering and Technology. It is located in the west suburban region of Guntur city, India.

Established in 1985, RVR&JC is under the patronage of the Nagarjuna Education Society. Today eight educational institutions are functioning under the banner of the society, with RVR&JC as the flagship.

The college offers eight B.Tech Degree courses and six M.Tech degree courses, besides MCA and MBA courses and is affiliated to Acharya Nagarjuna University, Guntur.

== Departments ==
=== Graduate courses ===
- Chemical Engineering
- Civil Engineering
- Computer Science and Engineering
- Electronics and Communication Engineering
- Electrical and Electronics Engineering
- Information Technology
- Mechanical Engineering
- Computer Science and Business Systems

=== Postgraduate courses ===
- Computer Science & Engineering (CSE)
- Power Systems (Electrical Engineering)
- Structural engineering (Civil Engineering)
- Machine Design (Mechanical Engineering)
- Communication Engineering & Signal Processing (ECE)
- Computer Science & Technology (CST)
- MCA (Master of Computer Applications)
- MBA (Master of Business Administration)

== History ==
The college was established in 1985 in Guntur. Later a larger and main campus was built in the western suburban area of Guntur City (Guntur district) in Chowdavaram. The college is developed up by NES trust. Now in the `Silver Jubilee Year' (2010–11), the R. V. R. & J. C. College of Engineering, Chowdavaram, Guntur trains Undergraduate and Postgraduate students in Engineering and Management for award of degree from Acharya Nagarjuna University.

Established by the Nagarjuna Education Society (1967) in the year 1985, the college drew its initial impetus from peoples' representatives, local doctors, charitable trusts and commercial houses of Guntur District. Today, it enjoys a flagship status among the eight constituent institutions that are governed by Nagarjuna Education Society.

Now in the 'Silver Jubilee Year' (2010–11), the R. V. R. & J. C. College trains undergraduate and postgraduate students in Engineering and Management for award of degree from Acharya Nagarjuna University.

In 2016, 302 students were recruited through campus interviews.

== Accreditation ==
All branches of the college have received accreditation from the National Board of Accreditation. This is the only college in Andhra Pradesh to get accreditation for all branches. The College has been accredited by the National Board of Accreditation (NBA) of AICTE five times so far. The college underwent the accreditation process for the first time in 1998. Accreditation from NBA was renewed for all seven departments of the college in 2002 and again in 2007 and 2012. Accreditation was granted by NBA for the fifth time for CSE, IT, ECE, EEE & ME UG courses (2017-2018 to 2019-2020).

The college was awarded A+ by the National Assessment and Accreditation Council (NAAC) in 2021.

== Ranking and recognition ==
The Andhra Pradesh State Council of Higher Education (APSCHE) awarded the second best rating in 'Academic Audit and Grading' in 2004. The College has consistently won the Best Performing U. G. College in the University Examinations under Acharya Nagarjuna University for the last four years. The College also figures in the Top-100 Engineering Colleges in India according to the latest Outlook survey and also rated as Top 100 Engineering Colleges in India 2013 surveyed by Way2College.

During the academic year 2016-2017, the Andhra Pradesh Fee Regulatory Committee (APFRC) has fixed the fee structure for 350 private engineering colleges in the state, based on infrastructure, quality of admission, campus recruitment, quality of faculty and a few other parameters. The fee for RVR & JC College of Engineering was fixed as Rs. 1,08,000. This is highest fee collecting private engineering college in the state, followed by Gayatri Vidya Parishad College of Engineering Visakhapatnam (Rs. 1,03,700), Velagapudi Ramakrishna Siddhardha Engineering College Vijayawada (Rs. 1,02,000) and GMR Institute of Technology Raajam (Rs. 1,02,000).
