= Amaravathi bus station =

Bus station in Andhra Pradesh, India

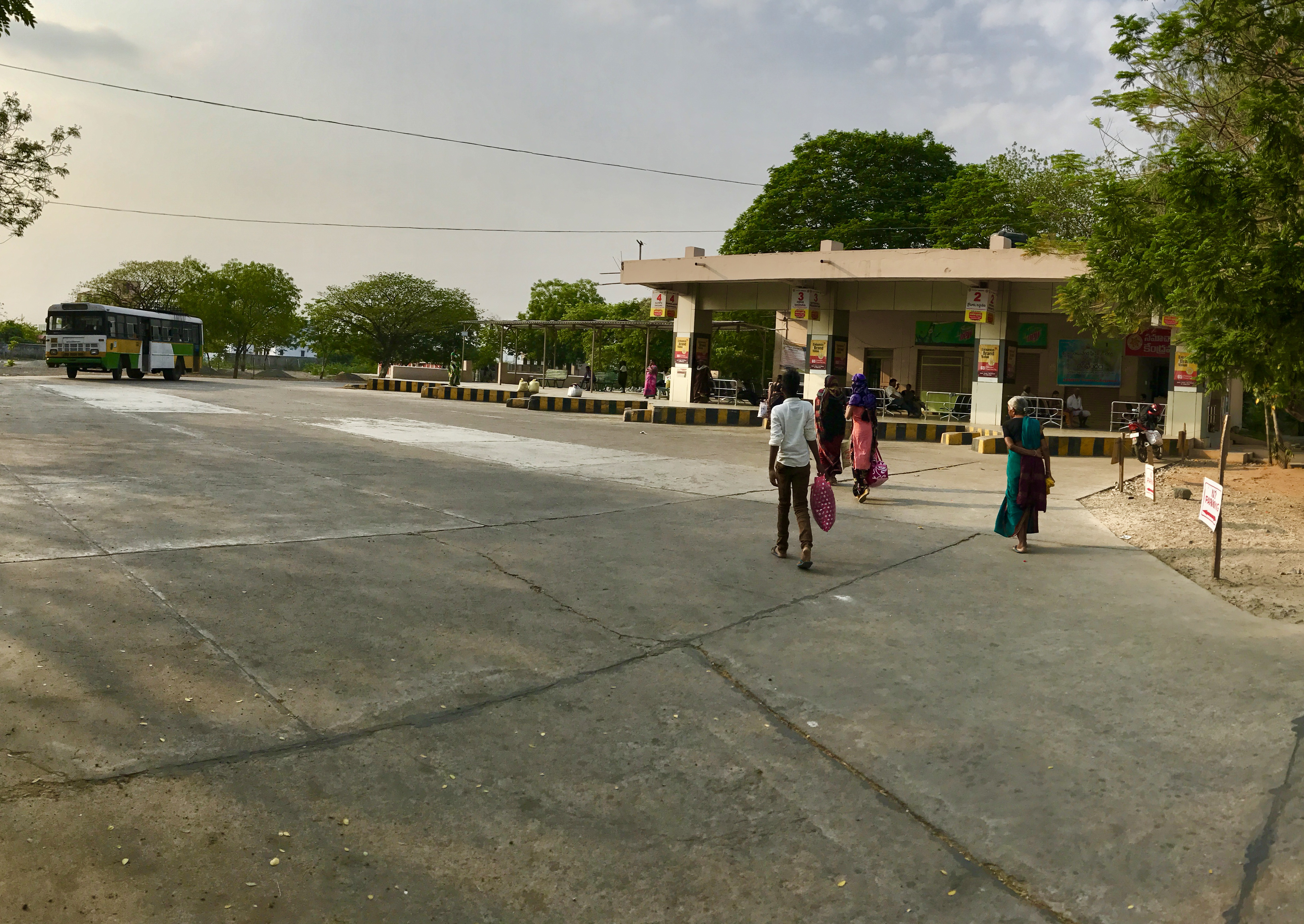

General information
- Location: Amaravathi, Palnadu district, Andhra Pradesh; India
- Owner: APSRTC
- Platforms: 06

Construction
- Structure type: on ground
- Parking: Yes

Other information
- Station code: AMT

Amaravathi bus station is a bus station located in Amaravathi village of the Indian state of Andhra Pradesh. It is owned by Andhra Pradesh State Road Transport Corporation. Services to Guntur, Vijayawada, Hyderabad, Mangalagiri, Sattenapalle, Krosuru and Tirupati etc. are available from here,
