= Bharat Overseas Bank =

Bank in India

Bharat Overseas Bank (BOB) was a private bank based in Chennai, India. In 2007, it merged with Indian Overseas Bank, which took over all the bank's employees, assets, and deposits.

BOB was established in 1973, in order to takeover for the Bangkok branch of the Indian Overseas Bank. It was one of the few private banks that the Reserve Bank of India permitted to have a branch outside India, and was the only bank representing India in Thailand. It was owned by seven banks (initial ownership figures in parentheses): Indian Overseas Bank (30%), Bank of Rajasthan (16%), Vysya Bank (14.66%), Karur Vysya Bank (10%), Federal Bank (19.67%), South Indian Bank (10%), and Karnataka Bank (8.67%), but in 2007 Indian Overseas Bank fully acquired the bank.
