= Chowdavaram, Guntur =

Chowdavaram
- Neighbourhood
- Location in Andhra Pradesh, India
- Coordinates: 16.2440°N 80.3283°E
- Country: India
- State: Andhra Pradesh
- District: Guntur
- Suburb: Guntur

Area
  - Total: 14.19 km^{2} (5.48 sq mi)

Population (2011)
  - Total: 6,939
  - Density: 489.0/km^{2} (1,267/sq mi)

Languages
  - Official: Telugu
- Time zone: UTC+5:30 (IST)

Chowdavaram is a neighbourhood of Guntur in the Indian state of Andhra Pradesh. It was merged in Guntur Municipal Corporation in 2012 and is a part of Guntur West mandal (formerly Guntur mandal).
