= Vengalayapalem =

- Village
- Interactive map of Vengalayapalem
- Location in Andhra Pradesh Vengalayapalem (India)
- Coordinates: 16°17′14″N 80°22′15″E
- Country: India
- State: Andhra Pradesh
- District: Guntur

Government
  - Type: Gram Panchayat

Languages
  - Official: Telugu
- Time zone: UTC+5:30 (IST)
- PIN: 522005

Vengalayapalem is a village in Guntur district of the Indian state of Andhra Pradesh. It is located in Guntur mandal of Guntur revenue division.
