= Brodipet =

- Neighbourhood
- Country: India
- State: Andhra Pradesh
- District: Guntur
- Municipality: Guntur
- PIN: 522002
- Vehicle registration: AP07

Brodipet is a neighborhood in Guntur of the Indian state of Andhra Pradesh. It is one of the residential areas of the city named after district collector Brodie in his memory.
