= Arundelpet =

- Neighbourhood
- Location in Andhra Pradesh, India
- Coordinates: 16.305141°N 80.4403014°E
- Country: India
- State: Andhra Pradesh
- District: Guntur
- PIN: 522002
- Vehicle registration: AP

Arundelpet is a neighborhood in the city of Guntur of the Indian state of Andhra Pradesh. It is one of the commercial areas of the city named after district collector Arundel in his memory.
