= Budampadu =

- Neighborhood
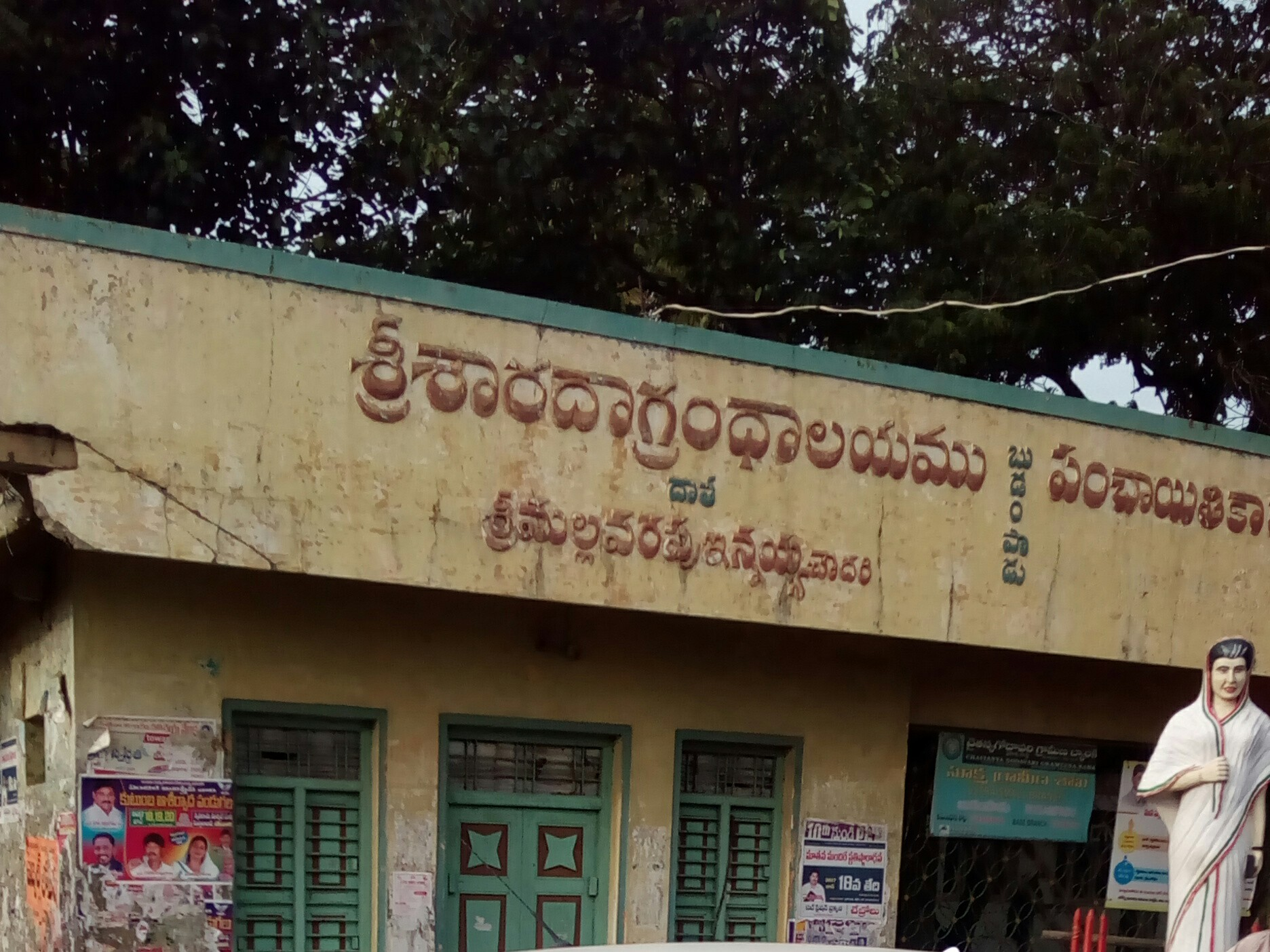
- Sri Sarada Library, Budampadu

- Location in Andhra Pradesh, India
- Coordinates: 16.2593°N 80.4756°E
- Country: India
- State: Andhra Pradesh
- District: Guntur
- City: Guntur

Area
  - Total: 10.21 km^{2} (3.94 sq mi)

Population (2011)
  - Total: 4,959
  - Density: 485.7/km^{2} (1,258/sq mi)

Languages
  - Official: Telugu
- Time zone: UTC+5:30 (IST)
- PIN: 522017
- Vehicle registration: AP

Budampadu is a neighbourhood of Guntur in the Indian state of Andhra Pradesh. It was merged in Guntur Municipal Corporation in 2012 and is a part of Guntur East mandal (formerly Guntur mandal).

== Transport ==
National Highway 16 and State Highway 48 are the major roads that passes through Budampadu area. The public transport is provided by APSRTC city buses, which are operated from NTR bus station towards Chebrolu.
