= Pedapalakaluru =

- Neighbourhood
- Location in Andhra Pradesh, India
- Coordinates: 16.3330°N 80.3805°E
- Country: India
- State: Andhra Pradesh
- District: Guntur
- Suburban: Guntur

Population (2011)
  - Total: 27,642 (includes 13,989 of village (part) and 13,653 of outgrowth)

Languages
  - Official: Telugu
- Time zone: UTC+5:30 (IST)
- PIN: 522307
- Vehicle registration: AP 07, AP 08

Pedapalakaluru is a neighbourhood of Guntur in the Indian state of Andhra Pradesh. It was merged in Guntur Municipal Corporation in 2012 and is a part of Guntur West mandal (formerly Guntur mandal).

== Transport ==
Palakaluru Road provides road connectivity to the area.
