= Guttikonda Bilam =

- Location within Andhra Pradesh
- Location: Guttikonda, Andhra Pradesh, India
- Coordinates: 16°23′42″N 79°49′41″E
- Elevation: 157 m

Guttikonda Bilam, also known as Guthikonda Bilam, is a historic cave and a hill in Piduguralla Mandal, Palnadu District of Andhra Pradesh, India. Guttikonda or Guthikonda is the name of a nearby village, while "Bilam" is the Sanskrit word for "cave". There are several caves in the region, collectively known as "Guthikonda Caves"; Guttikonda Bilam is the most well-known of these caves.

The cave is located around 3 km south of the Guttikonda village, which lies 15 km from Piduguralla, in the Palnadu district.

== History ==
Guttikonda Bilam is often called "Dakshina Kasi" by the locals. The cave is believed to have been used by sages for meditation. A copper sword found at the site suggests it was occupied in the Chalcolithic period. Memorials for People's War activists, including a portrait of Charu Mazumdar were erected in the cave. It has a simple stone arch at the entrance and shallow water inside.

== Discovery of Cave Fauna ==
In 2008, Dr. Shabuddin Shaik, a biospeleologist and faculty member at Acharya Nagarjuna University, made a significant discovery in Guttikonda Cave. While conducting research, he accidentally disturbed a pool of clear water, which became milky with tiny creatures. Upon further investigation, Shaik identified the micro-crustacean as a previously unknown species. This new species was named Andhracoides shabuddin in his honor. Shaik’s discoveries highlight the rich biodiversity hidden in Indian caves, much of which remains unexplored. His research sheds light on the evolution of various life forms and boosts taxonomy and biodiversity studies in India.
