= Guntur mandal =

- Former mandal of Guntur district
- 2018
- Map Guntur mandal - Interactive map
- Capital: Guntur
- Area
  - Coordinates: 16.3008°N 80.4428°E
- Population
  - 2011: 779,289
  - Type: Mandal
Succeeded by
Guntur East; Guntur West

Guntur Urban mandal (or Guntur mandal) was a former mandal in Guntur district of the Indian state of Andhra Pradesh, before it was split into Guntur East and Guntur West mandals in 2018. It was under the administration of Guntur revenue division and its headquarters at Guntur, The mandal was bounded by Medikonduru, Tadikonda, Pedakakani, Edlapadu, Prathipadu, Vatticherukuru and Chebrole mandals.

== Demographics ==
As of 2011 census, the mandal had a population of 779,289. The total population constituted 389,582 males and 389,707 females — a sex ratio of 1000 females per 1000 males. 77,189 children were in the age group of 0–6 years, of which 39,616 were boys and 37,573 were girls. The average literacy rate stood at 78.82% with 553,422 literates. The mandal had unique characteristics like having largest urban area, highest population and population density and the most number of literates of all the mandals of the district.

== Governance ==
The mandal was a part of the Andhra Pradesh Capital Region, under the jurisdiction of APCRDA. It was shared by two assembly constituencies namely, Guntur East (Assembly constituency) and Guntur West (Assembly constituency), which were segments of Guntur (Lok Sabha constituency).

== Settlements ==
Guntur Urban mandal covered Guntur Municipal Corporation and its urban agglomerations, covering gram panchayats of ten merged surrounding villages of Nallapadu, Pedapalakaluru, Ankireddipalem, Adavitakkellapadu, Gorantla, Pothuru, Chowdavaram, Etukuru, Budampadu and Reddy Palem. Chinapalakaluru and Jonnalagadda were the villages in the mandal.

== See also ==
- List of mandals in Andhra Pradesh
- Villages in Guntur mandal
