= Guntur West mandal =

Guntur West
- Mandal
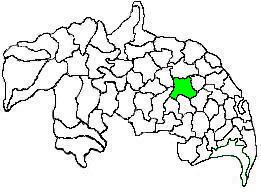
- Undivided Guntur urban mandal (East and West) in Guntur district
- Interactive map of Guntur West
- Location in Andhra Pradesh, India
- Coordinates: 16.3008°N 80.4428°E
- Country: India
- State: Andhra Pradesh
- District: Guntur
- Headquarters: Guntur

Government
  - Tehsildar: Tata Mohan Rao

Population (2011)
  - Total: 779,289

Languages
  - Official: Telugu
- Time zone: UTC+5:30 (IST)

Guntur West mandal is one of the 18 mandals in Guntur district of the Indian state of Andhra Pradesh. It is under the administration of Guntur revenue division and was formed by bifurcating Guntur urban mandal into Guntur East and Guntur West, with its headquarters at Guntur.

== Governance ==
The mandal is under the administration of a tahsildar. It forms part of the Andhra Pradesh Capital Region, under the jurisdiction of the APCRDA. Guntur west assembly constituency represents the state assembly and it is a segment of Guntur Lok sabha constituency.

== Settlements ==
Guntur West mandal covers a western part of Guntur Municipal Corporation and its urban agglomerations namely, Ankireddipalem, Chowdavaram, Guntur West constituency, Koritepadu, Nallapadu, Pedapalakaluru, Pothuru and R Agraharam. Except Chinapalakaluru, all other areas were already de-notified and merged with Guntur Municipal Corporation in 2012.

== See also ==
- List of mandals in Andhra Pradesh
- Villages in Guntur mandal
