= Gorantla, Guntur =

Gorantla Guntur-Kokapeta
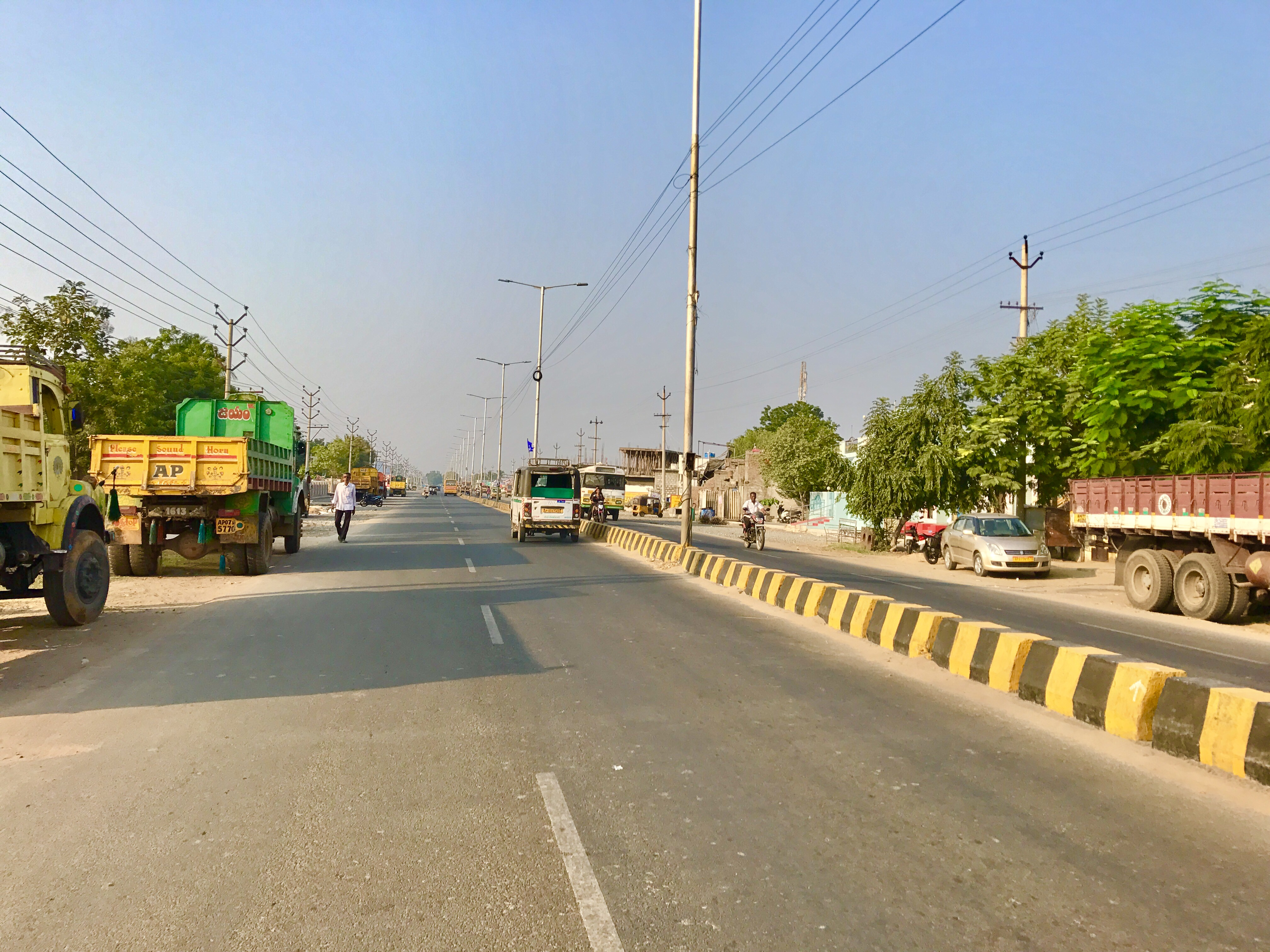
- Gorantla Main Road
- Nickname: Guntur-Kokapeta
- Location in Andhra Pradesh, India
- Coordinates: 16.3459°N 80.4420°E
- Country: India
- State: Andhra Pradesh
- District: Guntur
- General category: Municipality
  - Rank: 18th In Guntur District as per area, Surrounded by IRR 50& 40 W

Population (2025 (approx))
  - Total: 26,623 (includes 19,711 of village (part) and 8,912 of outgrowth)
  - Rank: 44th as per GMC 58wards.Merged with APCRDA.
  - Density: 112/km^{2} (290/sq mi)

Telugu
  - Official: [[Telugu language]|Telugu]]
- Time zone: UTC+5:30 (IST)
- PIN: 522034
- Vehicle registration: AP40, AP39, AP07

Gorantla is a neighbourhood of Guntur in the Indian state of Andhra Pradesh. It was merged in Guntur Municipal Corporation in 2012 and is a part of Guntur Rural (formerly Guntur Mandal).
