= Nallapadu =

- Neighbourhood
- Location in Andhra Pradesh, India
- Coordinates: 16.2991°N 80.3867°E
- Country: India
- State: Andhra Pradesh
- District: Guntur

Area
  - Total: 16.43 km^{2} (6.34 sq mi)

Population (2011)
  - Total: 9,820
  - Density: 598/km^{2} (1,550/sq mi)

Languages
  - Official: Telugu
- Time zone: UTC+5:30 (IST)
- Telephone code: +91–8640
- Vehicle registration: AP

Nallapadu is a neighbourhood of Guntur in the Indian state of Andhra Pradesh. It was merged in Guntur Municipal Corporation in 2012 and is a part of Guntur West mandal. It is situated on the south west of Guntur on SH 2.
