= Guntur =

Guntur Garthapuri
- City
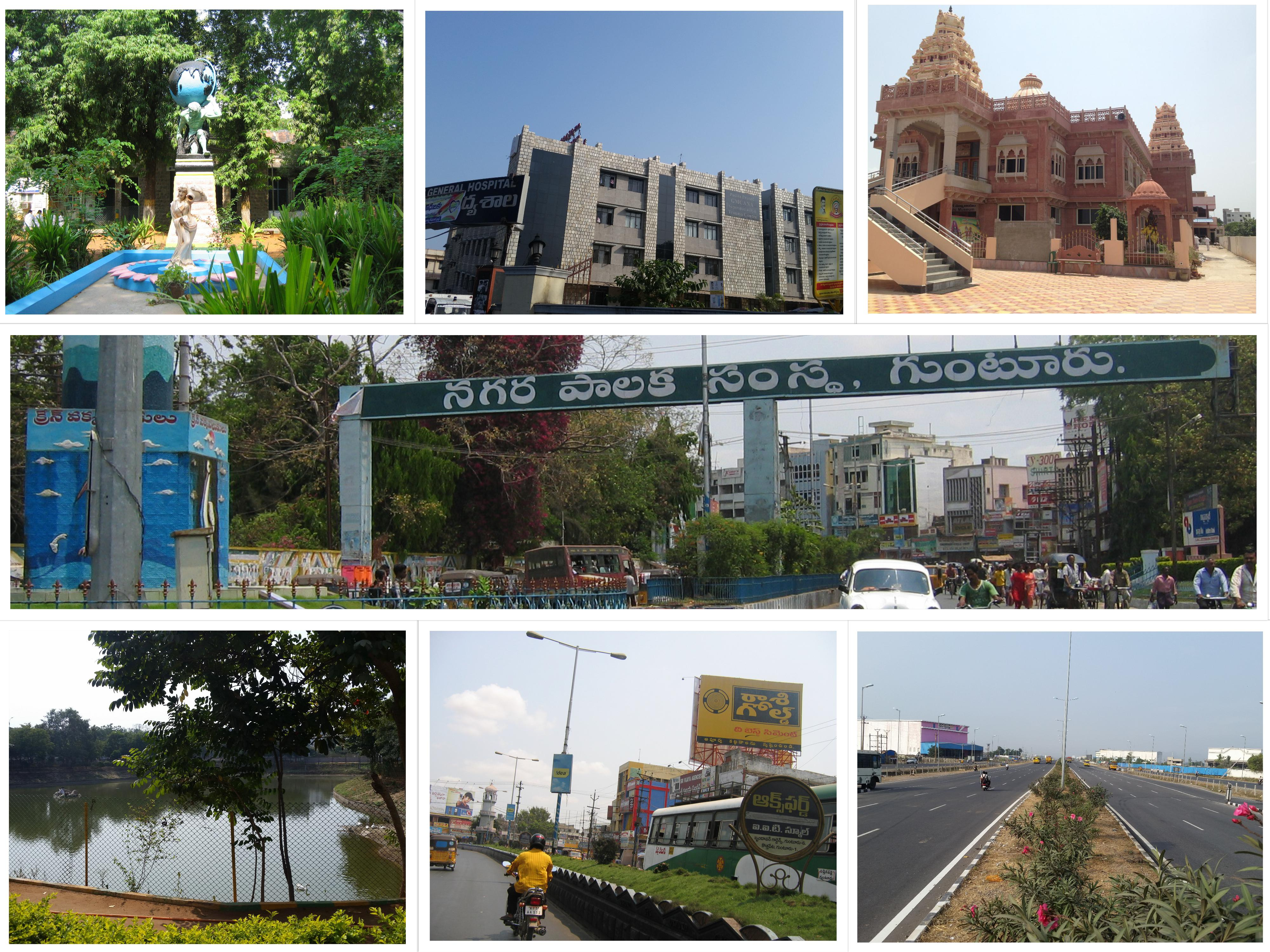
- Clockwise from Top Left: Guntur Medical College, General Hospital, Iskcon Temple, Guntur Municipal Corporation, Chuttugunta Centre, One-Town Centre, A park with pond in Gujjanagundla.
- Nickname: Land of Chillies
- Interactive map of Guntur
- Location in Andhra Pradesh, India
- Coordinates: 16.3008°N 80.4428°E
- Country: India
- State: Andhra Pradesh
- Region: Coastal Andhra
- District: Guntur
- Incorporated (Municipality): 1866
- Incorporated (Corporation): 1994

Government
  - Type: Municipal Corporation
  - Body: Guntur Municipal Corporation; Andhra Pradesh Capital Region
  - Mayor: Kovelamudi Lakshmi Aparna (TDP)
  - MP: Chandra Sekhar Pemmasani (TDP)

Area
  - City: 159.46 km^{2} (61.57 sq mi)
- Elevation: 33 m (108 ft)

Population (2011)
  - City: 743,354
  - Rank: 3rd (in Andhra Pradesh); 64th (in India)
  - Density: 4,661.7/km^{2} (12,074/sq mi)
  - Metro: 1,028,667
- Demonyms: Gunturian; Gunturodu

Literacy

Languages
  - Official: Telugu
- Time zone: UTC+5:30 (IST)
- PIN: 522001
- Telephone code: +91-863
- Vehicle registration: AP
- Nominal GDP(2023-24): ₹27,230 crore (equivalent to ₹290 billion or US$3.0 billion in 2026)
- Website: cdma.ap.gov.in/en/guntur

Guntur, natively spelt as Gunturu, is a city in the Indian state of Andhra Pradesh and the administrative headquarters of Guntur district. The city is part of the Andhra Pradesh Capital Region and is located on the Eastern Coastal Plains approximately 14 miles (23 km) south-west of the state capital Amaravati. Guntur is the second largest by area in the state with 159.46 square kilometres (61.57 square miles) of land. According to data from the 2011 Census of India, Guntur had a population of 743,354 in that year, making it the third-most-populous city in the state,. The city is the heartland of the state, located in the center of Andhra Pradesh and making it a central part connecting different regions.

The city is home to numerous state government offices and agencies. being part of the district capital and being in close proximity to the state capital Amaravati. The city is about 1100 miles south of the national capital New Delhi. It is classified as a Y-grade city as per the Seventh Central Pay Commission. It is the 24th most densely populated city in the world and 11th in India. Guntur was estimated to have population of around 0.9 million in 2021 and by the year 2026 the city has 1.1 million wider metropolitan urban region population.

Guntur serves as a major hub for the export of chilli, cotton and tobacco, and has the largest chilli-market yard in Asia. It is also a major hub for transport, education, medicine and commercial activities in the state. Ancient temples and sites near the city include Kondaveedu Fort, Amareswaraswamy temple, and Undavalli Caves, and Sri Bramarambha Malleswara Swamy Temple at Pedakakani.

== Etymology ==
In Sanskrit documents, Guntur was referred to as Garthapuri; in Telugu, "Guntlapuri" means "a place surrounded by water ponds". The settlement might have been near a pond (Telugu: "gunta"); hence "gunta uru" means "pond village". Another source refers to "kunta", a land-measuring unit, which may have transformed to "kunta uru" and later to "Guntur".

== History ==
The ancient Vedic puranas, going back to the Treta Yuga and Dvapara Yuga, mention Sitanagaram and the Guttikonda caves near Guntur.

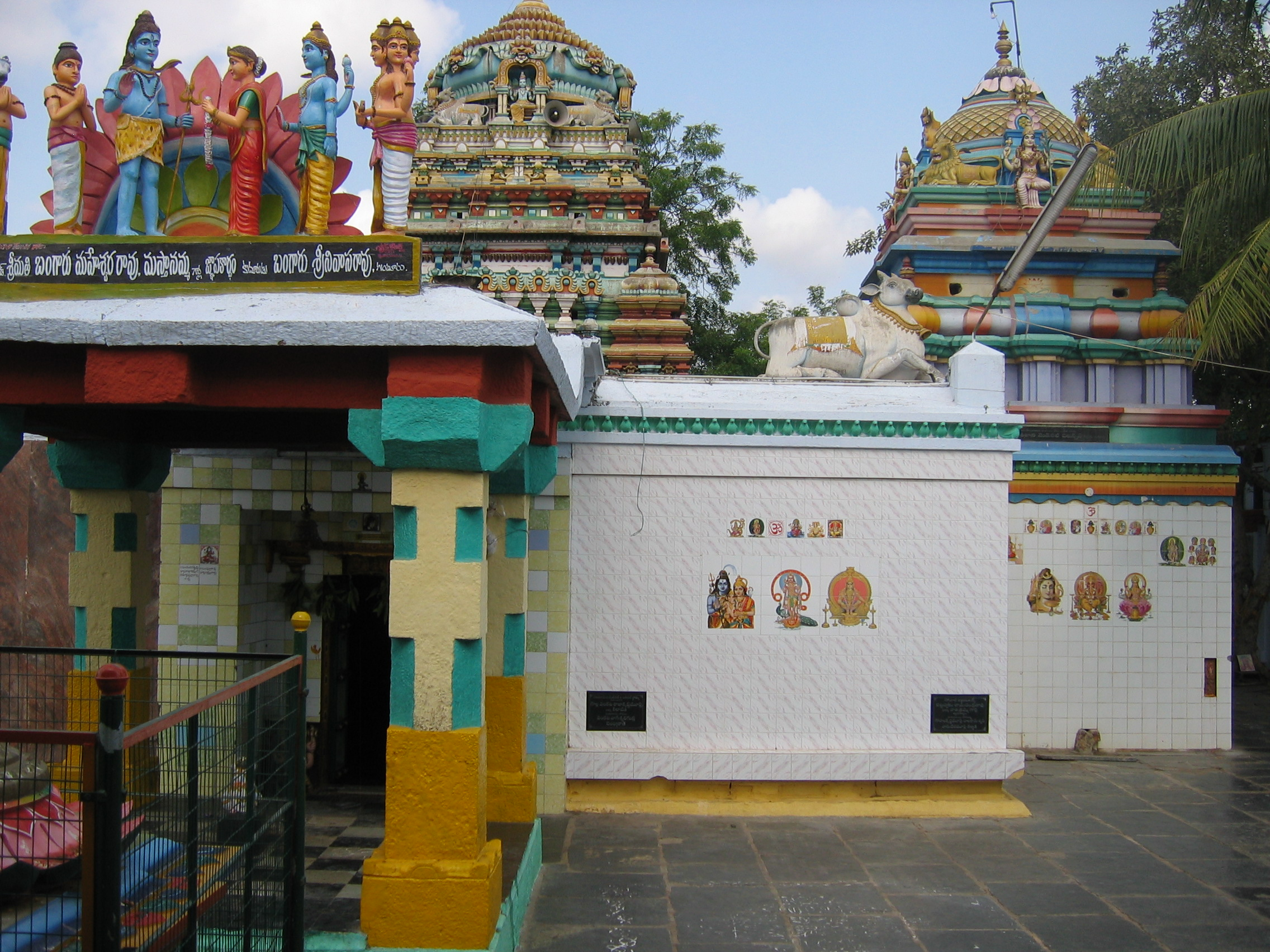
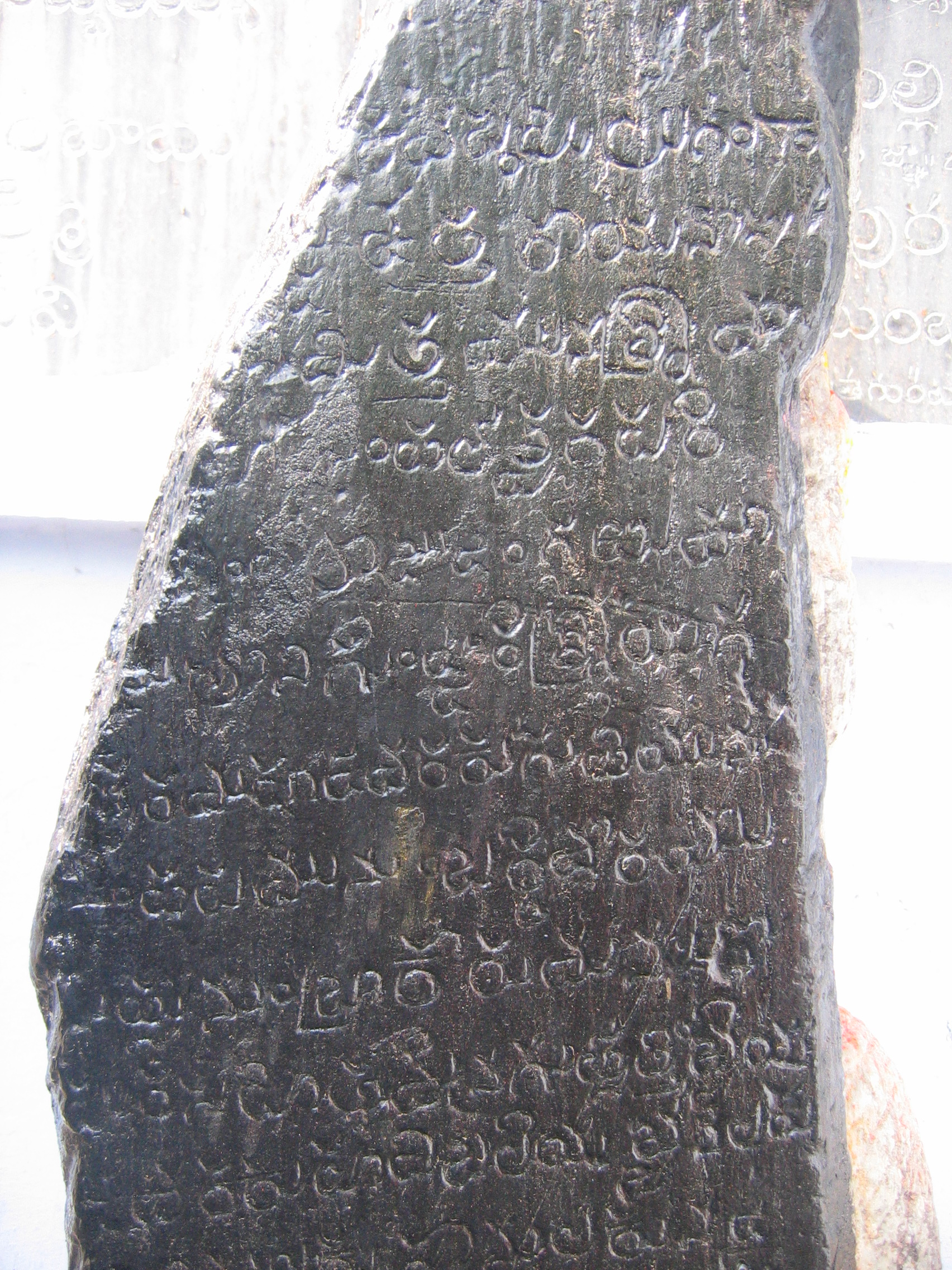
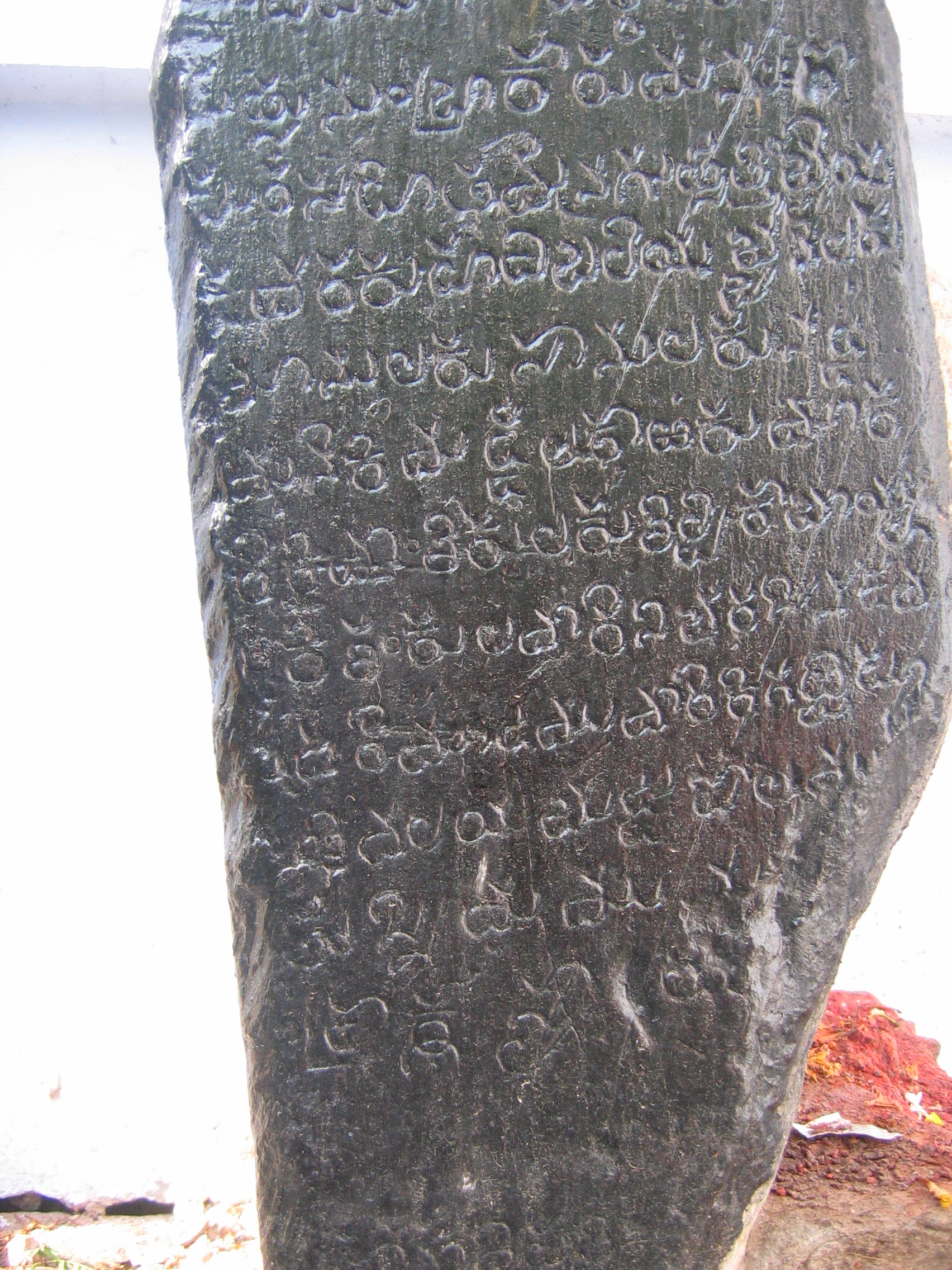
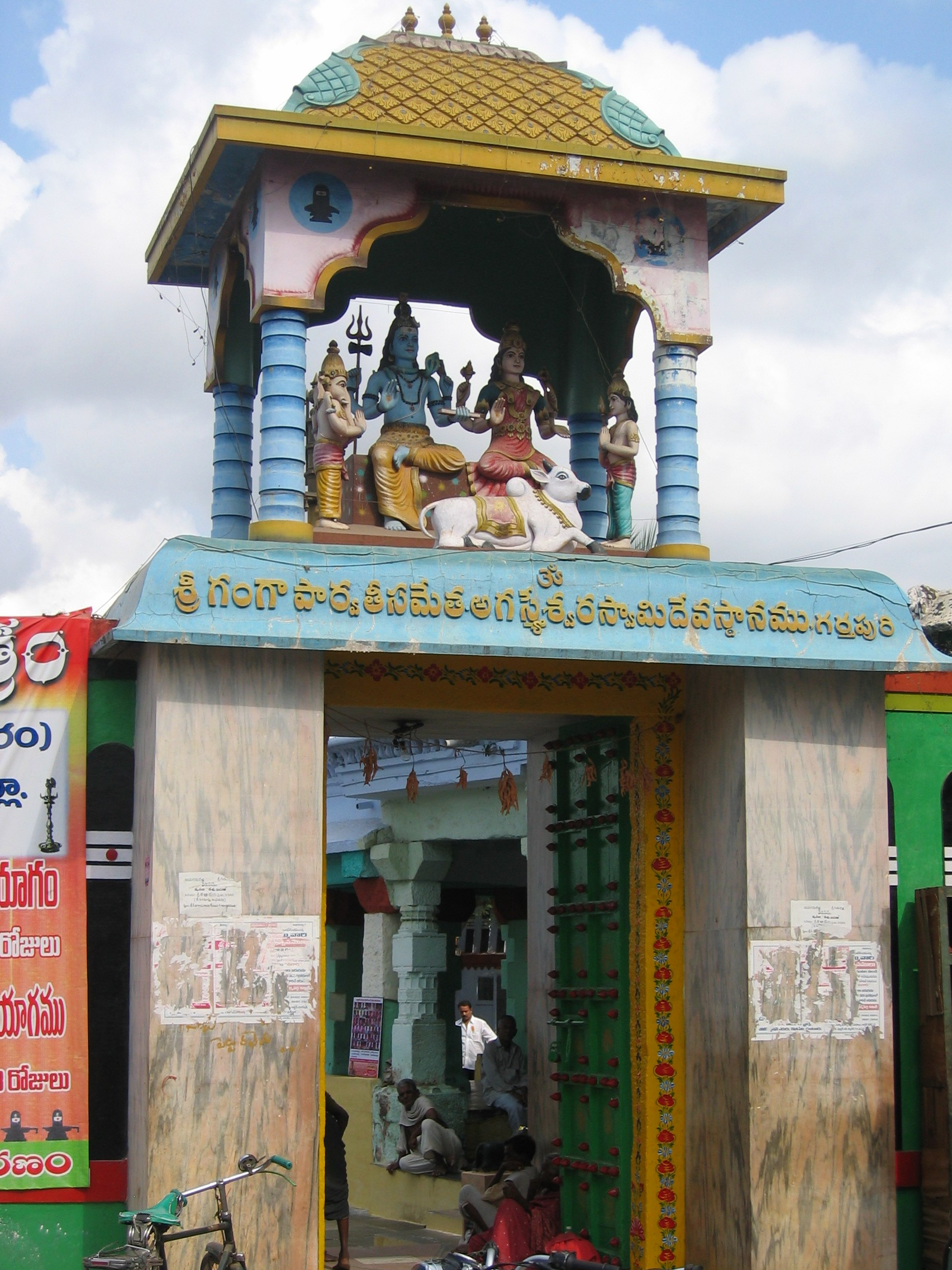
Sivalayam temple in old city and inscriptions

The region was historically known for Buddhism; the first Kalachakra ceremony was performed by Gautama Buddha. Agastyeshwara temple is one of the oldest temples in the city; according to a local legend, Agastya built it in the Treta Yuga around a swayambhu linga. Inscriptions on the side of Naga Muchalinda, a sculpture unearthed in 2018 in the compound of the temple, are in Naga Lipi, an ancient script from the third century CE. Based on this discovery, Emani Sivanagi Reddy, archaeologist and Buddhist scholar believes this region served as a Buddhist site contemporary to Nagarjunakonda.

The earliest reference to Guntur is found in inscriptions by Ammaraja I (922–929 CE), the Vengi Chalukyan king. According to an inscription in Sri Narasimha Swami temple at Ramachandra Agraharam, Tirumala Dasa Mahapatra—the local ruler of the Gajapathi king Kapileswara Gajapathi—gave donations to the temple of Mulastha Mallikarjuna Deva in 1485 CE.

Prior to the British Raj, Guntur has been ruled by the Satavahanas, Andhra Ikshvakus, Vishnukundinas, Pallavas, Vengi Chalukyas, Kakatiya kings, Reddy kings, Gajapathi kings, and Vijayanagar kings, Nizams of Hyderabad, French India, and the British East India Company. The British East India Company took over the Kondaveedu Fort in 1788 and abandoned it in the early 19th century in favour of Guntur, which was made the headquarters of a district named after it. The district was abolished in 1859 and reconstituted in 1904.

The city rapidly became a major market for agricultural produce from the surrounding countryside due to the opening of the railway link in 1890. The expansion continued post independence as well and was concentrated in what is now called New Guntur, with many urban areas such as Brodipet, Arundelpet and suburban areas like Pattabhipuram, Chandramoulinagar, Sitaramanagar, and Brindavan Gardens. In 2012, the city limits were expanded with the merger of surrounding ten villages, namely Nallapadu, Pedapalakaluru, Ankireddipalem, Adavitakkellapadu, Gorantla, Pothuru, Chowdavaram, Etukuru, Budampadu and Reddypalem.

The High Court was set up in Guntur when Andhra State was formed. It was moved to Hyderabad after the formation of Andhra Pradesh. After the bifurcation of the state a new High Court is set up in the capital region of the residual state near Guntur.

Guntur is the place of discovery of helium; they discovered this in 1869 from observations of the solar eclipse of 18 August 1868 by the French astronomer Pierre Janssen. Allen Olliver Becker's family from Guntur was among the survivors of the Titanic ship disaster.

== Geography ==
Scenic hills to the West of the city

Guntur is located at 16.29°N 80.43°E. It has an average elevation of 33 metres (108 ft) and is situated on the plains. There are few hills in the surrounding suburban areas and Perecherla Reserve Forest is located in the city's north-west. Guntur lies approximately 30 kilometres (19 mi) south of Amaravati, the capital of Andhra Pradesh.

=== Climate ===
According to the Köppen-Geiger climate classification system, the climate in Guntur is tropical with dry winters (Aw). The average temperature is warm-to-hot year round. The summer season, especially May and June, has the highest temperatures, which are usually followed by monsoon rains. During the winter season, running from November to February, the weather is usually dry with little-to-no rainfall. The wettest month is July. The average annual temperature is 28.5 °C (83.3 °F) and annual rainfall is about 905 millimetres (36 in). Rain storms and cyclones are common in the region during the rainy season, which starts with the monsoons in early June. Cyclones may occur any time of the year but occur most commonly between May and November.

Guntur has been ranked 11th best “National Clean Air City” under (Category 2 3-10L Population cities) in India.

== Demographics ==
Historical population
Year	Pop.	±%
1981	367,699	—
1991	471,051	+28.1%
2001	514,461	+9.2%
2011 (Note: prior to merger of neighbouring villages in 2012)	670,073	+30.2%
Source: (1981–2011)

Based on the 2011 Census of India, after a merger of nearby villages in 2012, Guntur had a population of 743,354. The 2023 estimate of the city population is 9,81,000. It is classified as a Y-grade city under the Seventh Central Pay Commission.

Based on the 2011 census data prior to the city's expansion in 2012, Telugu is the most-widely spoken language with 545,928 native speakers, followed by 109,574 Urdu speakers. A significant minority speak Hindi, Odia and Tamil. The religious demographic consists of 522,030 Hindus (77.91%), 120,974 Muslims (18.05%), 21,787 Christians (3.25%), 2,312 Jains (0.35%) and 2,605 (0.82%) did not state any religion. One of the supposedly lost tribes of Israel called Bene Ephraim has a presence in Guntur; there is a Jewish synagogue at Kothareddypalem near Chebrolu.

== Governance ==
=== Civic administration and politics ===
Guntur Municipal Corporation

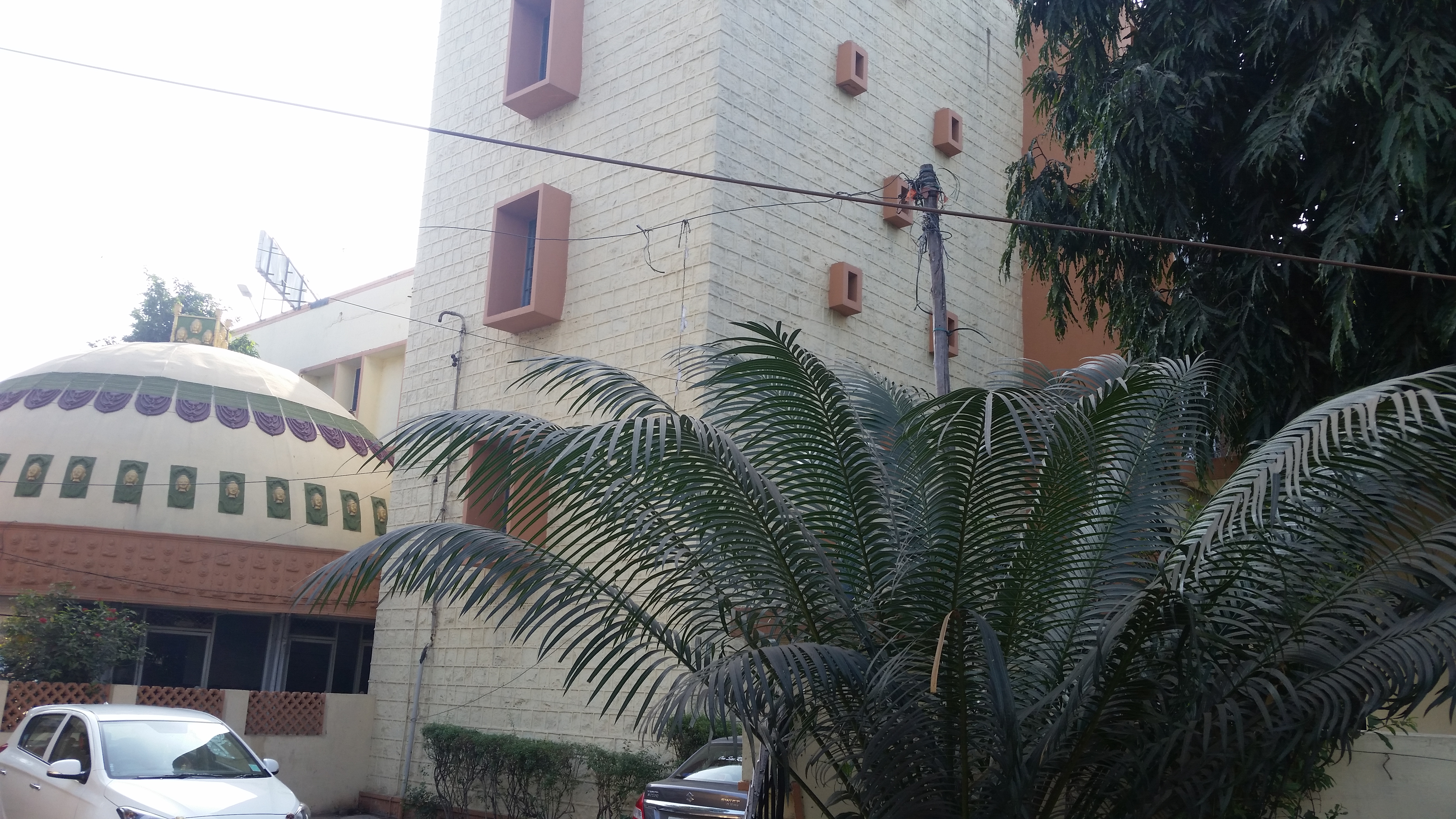
Municipal Corporation Office, Guntur

The city's local authority is Guntur Municipal Corporation (GMC), which at over 150 years old, is one of India's oldest municipalities. It was constituted in 1886, when the city had a population of 25,000; the city was upgraded to a third-grade municipality in 1891, a first-grade municipality in 1917, a special-grade municipality in 1952, and a selection-grade municipality in 1960. In 1994, Guntur was upgraded as a municipal corporation and its first local election was held in 1995. The city is divided into 57 revenue wards. During the financial year 2018–19, the corporation had a budget of ₹1,004 crore (equivalent to ₹15 billion or US$150 million in 2026).

Guntur is one of thirty-one cities in the state to be a part of water-supply-and-sewerage-services mission known as Atal Mission for Rejuvenation and Urban Transformation (AMRUT). The city was certified as open defecation free as part of Swachh Bharat Mission. In the 2023 Swachh Survekshan rankings, Guntur was ranked fourth in India, rising from its ranking of 129th in 2018.

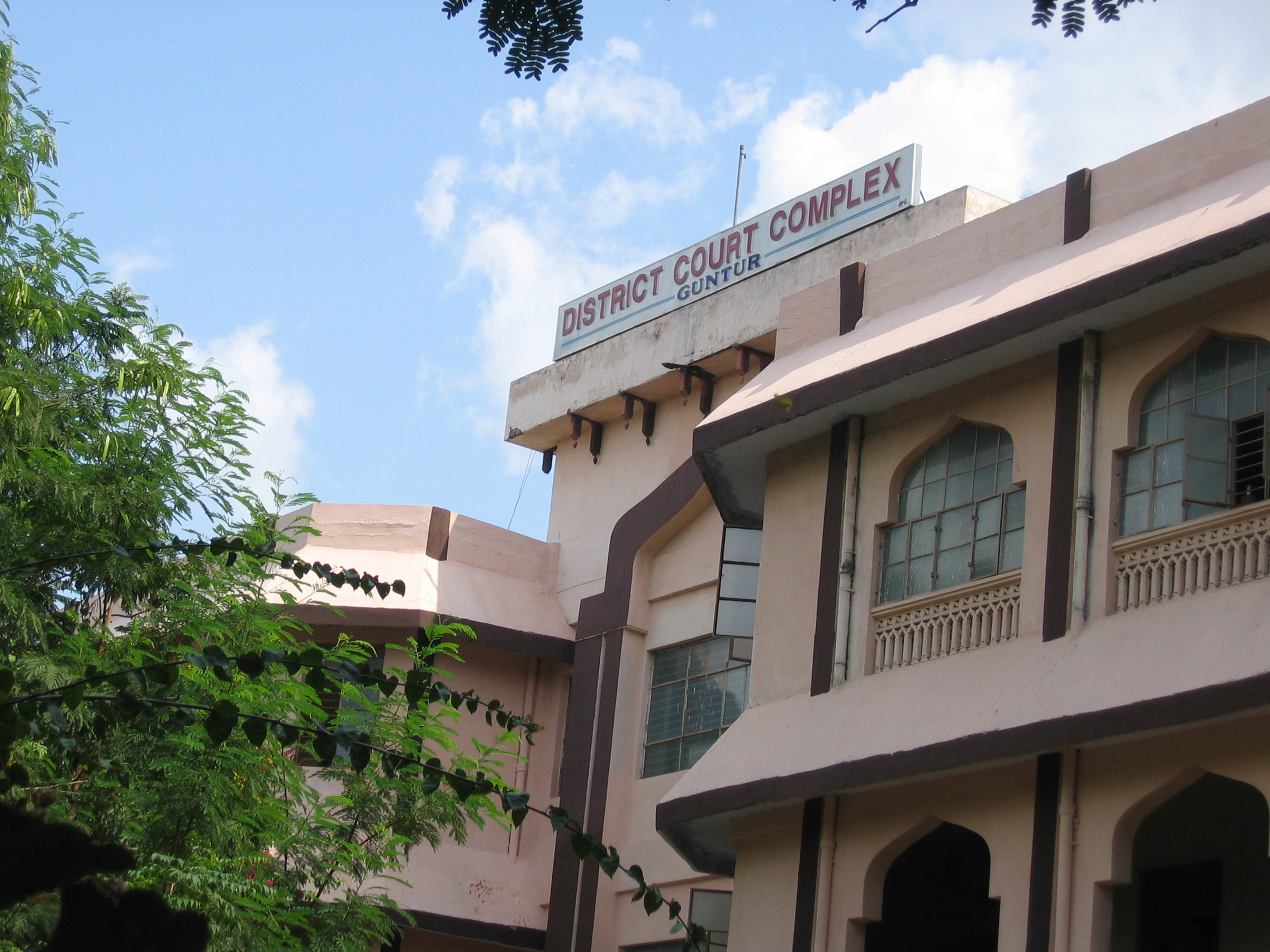
District Court Complex

Guntur is the headquarters of Guntur East and Guntur West mandals in Guntur revenue division. The city is a major part of Andhra Pradesh Capital Region Development Authority. It is represented in the federal government by Guntur Lok Sabha constituency, and at state level by Guntur East and Guntur West assembly constituencies.

=== Municipal finance ===
As per the Ministry of Housing and Urban Affairs, the Guntur Municipal Corporation reported a total revenue of ₹2.76 billion (US$0.33 billion), a total expenditure of ₹1.91 billion (US$0.23 billion), a total tax revenue of ₹1.15 billion, a total own revenue of ₹2.45 billion, and total grants of ₹0.05 billion in 2022–23. Taxes contributed to 41.7% of the revenue, while the remaining income came from non-tax sources such as grants and other municipal revenues.

=== Other offices ===
As part of the Andhra Pradesh Capital Region, Guntur houses many state offices and agencies such as Andhra Pradesh Forest Department and the Agricultural Marketing Department, and regional office of the Crime Investigation Department. The AP State Judicial Preview offices are located at Nagarampalem. Guntur group of the National Cadet Corps is located at Syamalanagar. The city also hosts an Indian Army recruitment and training centre. The city's passport office was opened in 2018.

== Healthcare, utilities and policing ==
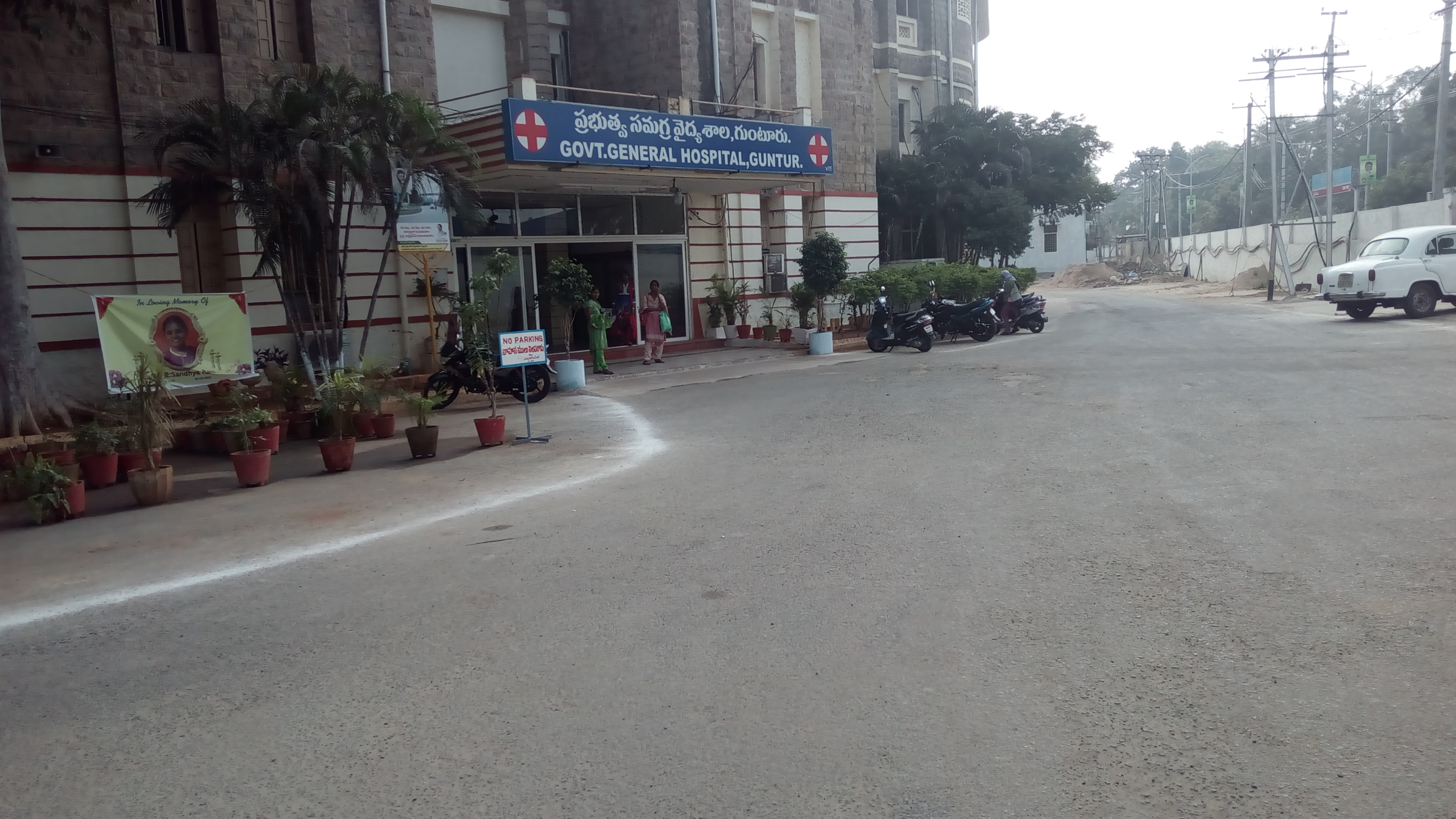
Government General Hospital, Sambasivapet

Guntur has several urban healthcare centres and about 200 private hospitals, including several specialty centres. The Government General Hospital (GGH) is the city's main tertiary healthcare provider.

The city's main source of drinking water is Guntur Channel, which draws water from the Krishna River. An extension of this channel is being planned to increase coverage of the city and the capital region. Summer storage tanks are located in Sangam Jagarlamudi, and Vengalayapalem reservoir is the other source of water to the city. The city's electricity is provided by Andhra Pradesh Southern Power Distribution Company Limited (APSPDCL).

Guntur police uses surveillance and central monitoring control systems with high-resolution cameras at important traffic junctions. The Government of Andhra Pradesh has approved the formation of formation of Guntur Police Commissionerate that includes Guntur City plus Capital region and issued GOMS No. 197 dated 5th October 2026.

== Economy ==
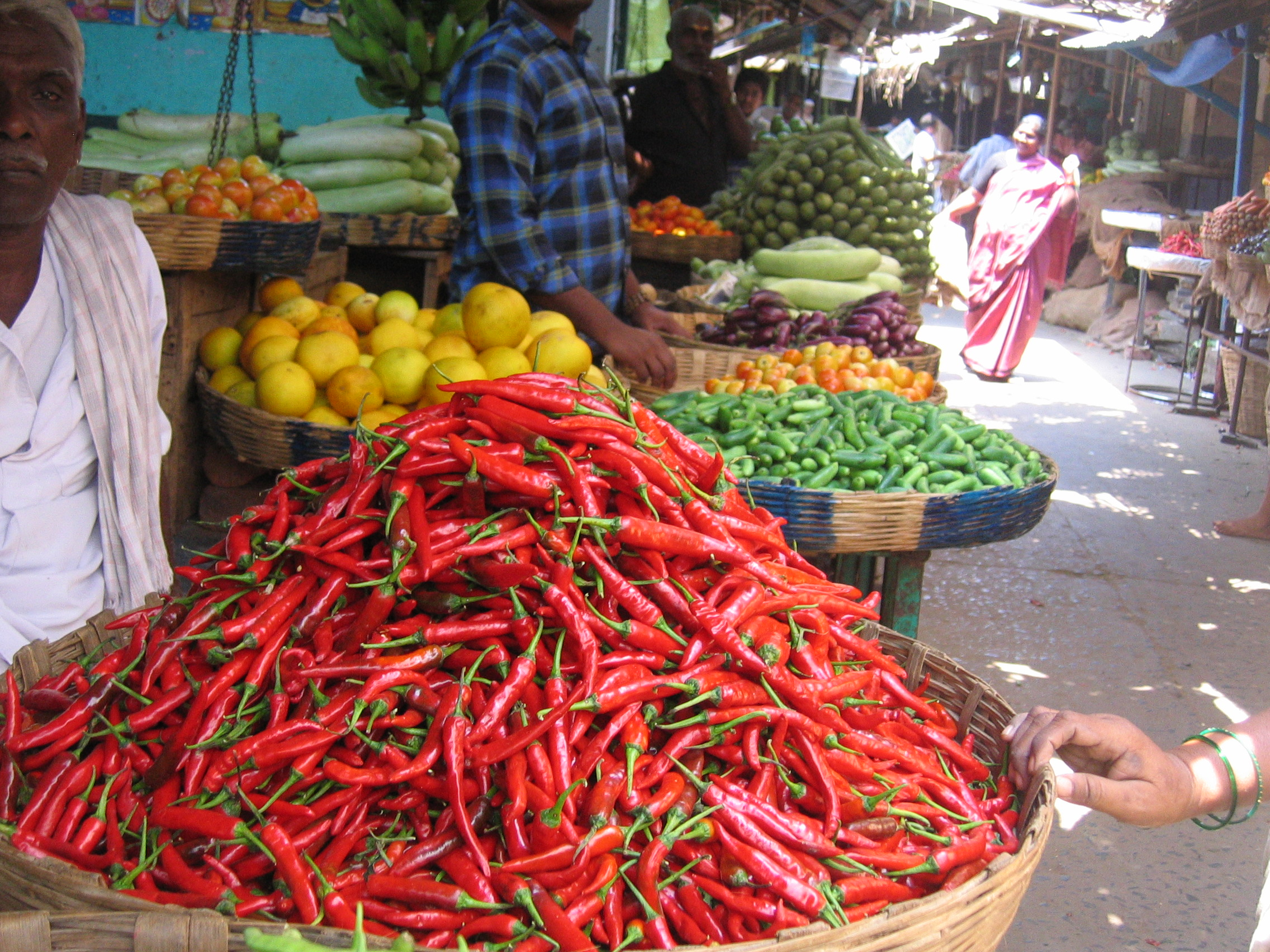
A shop at Kannavari Thota Vegetable and Fruit Market

The GDP per capita of Guntur City is US$8,786.

Guntur forms a part of the East Coast Economic Corridor. Due to its status as the district capital and part of the state capital region, Guntur houses many state offices and agencies, including the headquarters of the Agricultural Marketing Department, the Tobacco Board and the Spices Board.

India is the world's biggest exporter of chillies and much of this is grown around Guntur. The city's Agriculture Market Committee Market Yard in Guntur is the largest chilli yard in Asia; in 2023, its sales exceeded sales ₹10,000 crore (US$1.0 billion) during that year's trading season. There are also several spinning mills on the outskirts of the city.

== Culture ==
Residents of Guntur are referred as Gunturians. Cultural events with focus on literature and poetry are regularly organised. A vibrant Arts festival called Amaravathi Chitrakala Veedhi is organized in the city during the month of August in 2026. Venkateswara Vignana Mandiram and Annamaiah Kalavedika are popular venues for cultural programs. In 2021, a new venue called Gurram Jashua Kala Pranganam was being constructed. The city observes many festivals such as Rama Navami, Hanuman Jayanthi, Maha Shivaratri, Vinayaka Chavithi, Vijaya Dasami, Deepawali, Holi, Ugadi, Eid, Krishnastami, Christmas, Karthika Pournami.

=== Cityscape ===
The major commercial and residential areas in the city include Arundelpet, Lakshmipuram and Brodipet. Other major areas of the city are Koretapadu, Navabharath Nagar, Pattabhipuram, Syamalanagar and Vidyanagar, Autonagar, Gorantla, Pedapalakaluru, Nallapadu, Budampadu and Chowdavaram.

Integration Pillar, Chowdavaram

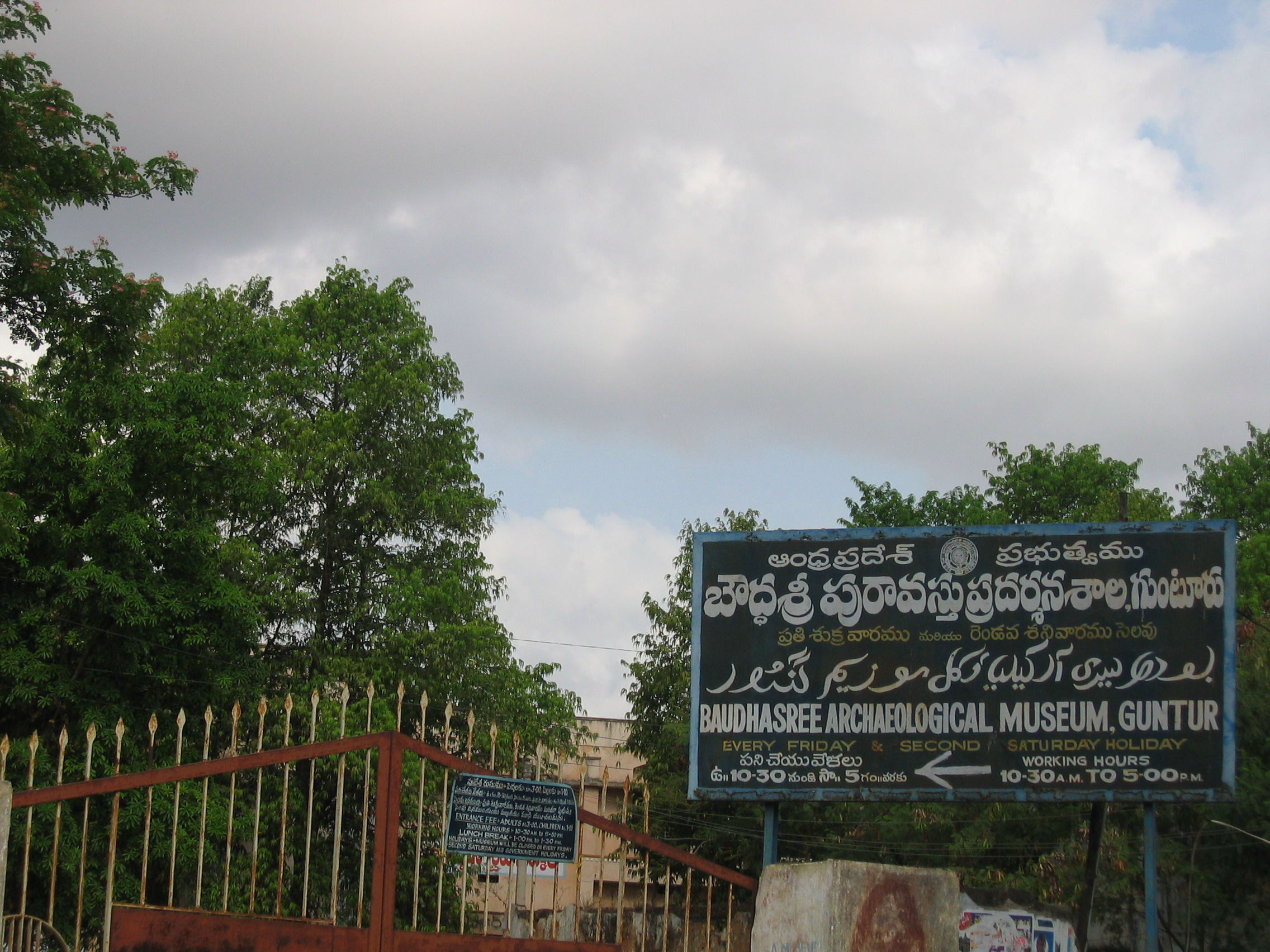
Baudhasree Museum, Kannavari Thota

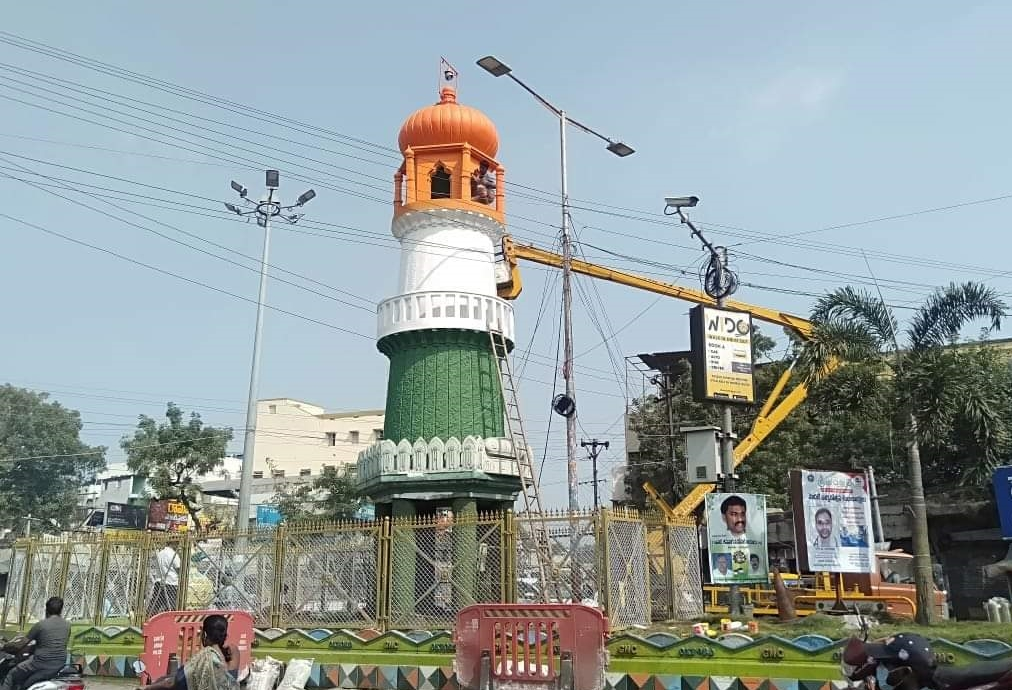
Jinnah Tower, MG Road

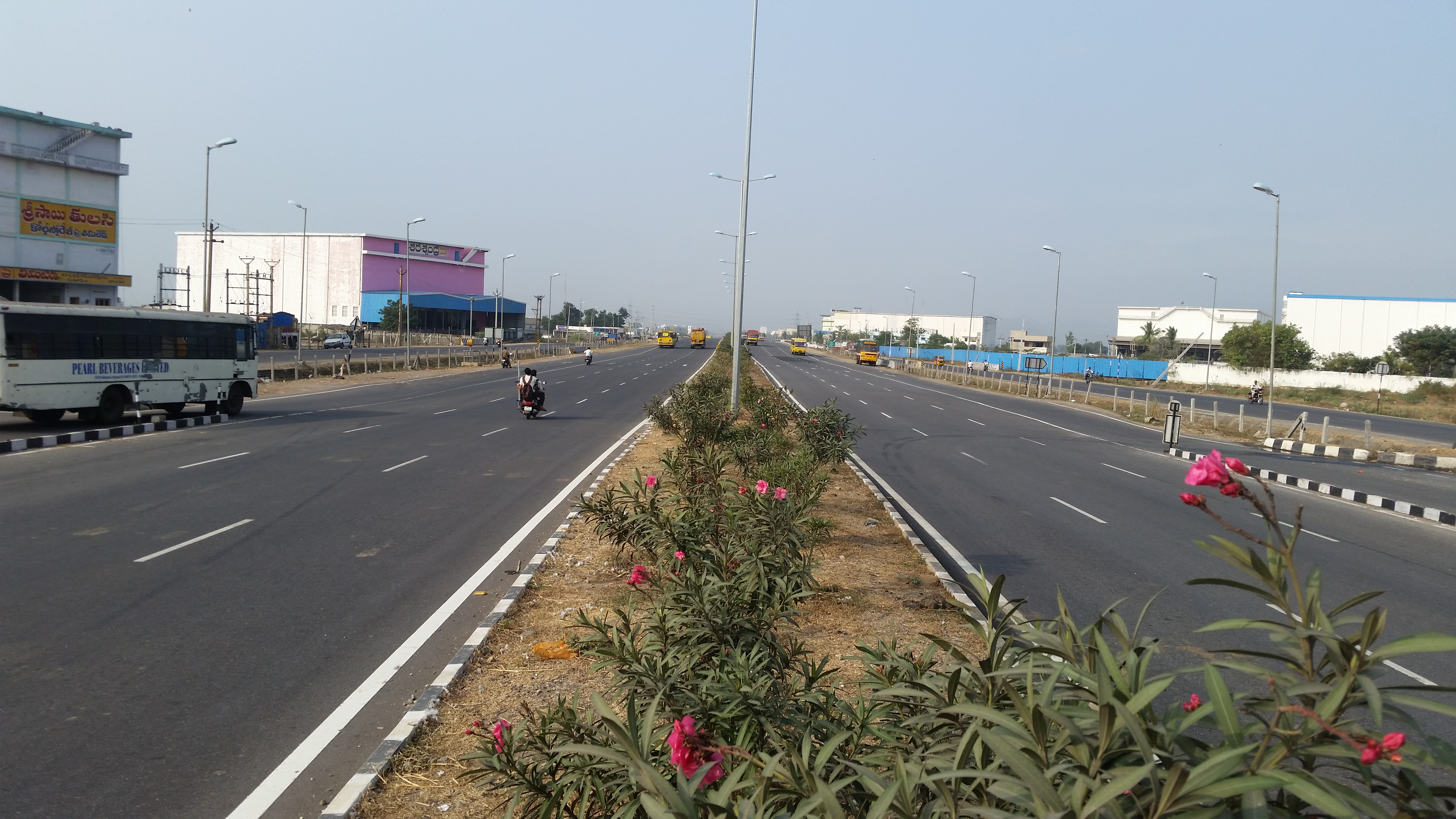
Chuttugunta center in Guntur

The Universal Integration Pillar at Viswanagar/Chowdavaram is an iconic monument representing the inclusiveness and oneness of eternal/ageless very ancient Sanatana Dharma of the region. The Dandi March Statues represent the freedom struggles and political movements that took place to achieve independence to India from colonial powers. Jinnah Tower on Mahatma Gandhi Road is a rare monument related to Muhammad Ali Jinnah, founder of Pakistan, in India. Guntur has 17 parks, some of which are maintained by the municipal corporation. Nagaravanam, a part of Perecherla Reserve Forest, was developed on the outskirts of the city as a park.

Tourist attractions and landmarks in Guntur (Interactive map)

Tourist attractions in Guntur include the Sri Ganga Parvathi Sametha Agastheswara Temple. In the old city, notable sites include Gandhi Park, the Baudhasree architectural museum, Nagaravanam, and NTR Manasa Sarovaram. Nearby ancient temples and heritage sites include the Amareswaraswamy temple, Undavalli Caves, Sri Bramarambha Malleswara Swamy Temple at Pedakakani, and Kondaveedu Fort. The Uppalapadu Bird Sanctuary is located 10 km (6.2 mi) from the city, while Suryalanka Beach is approximately 60 km (37 mi) away.

Agastheswara Sivalayam, situated in Guntur's old city, is a temple devoted to Lord Shiva. It holds historical significance with inscriptions in the ancient "Naga Lipi" script, dating back to 1100 AD. The temple is among the most well known in the region. According to local legends, the sage Rishi Agastya constructed the temple during the Treta Yuga, centered around a naturally occurring Swayambhu Linga, which led to the temple's name.

== Environment ==
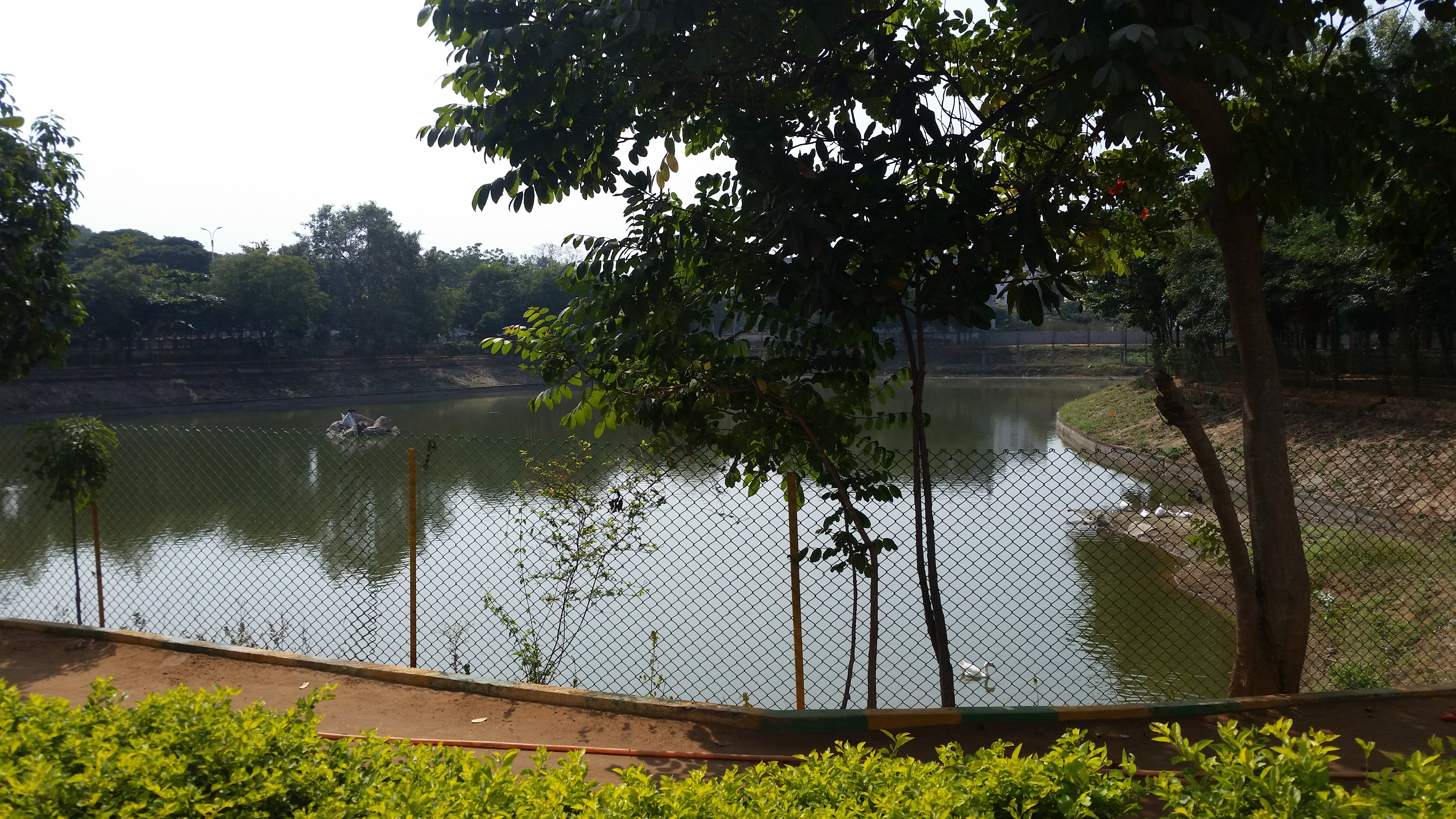
Gujjanagundla lake

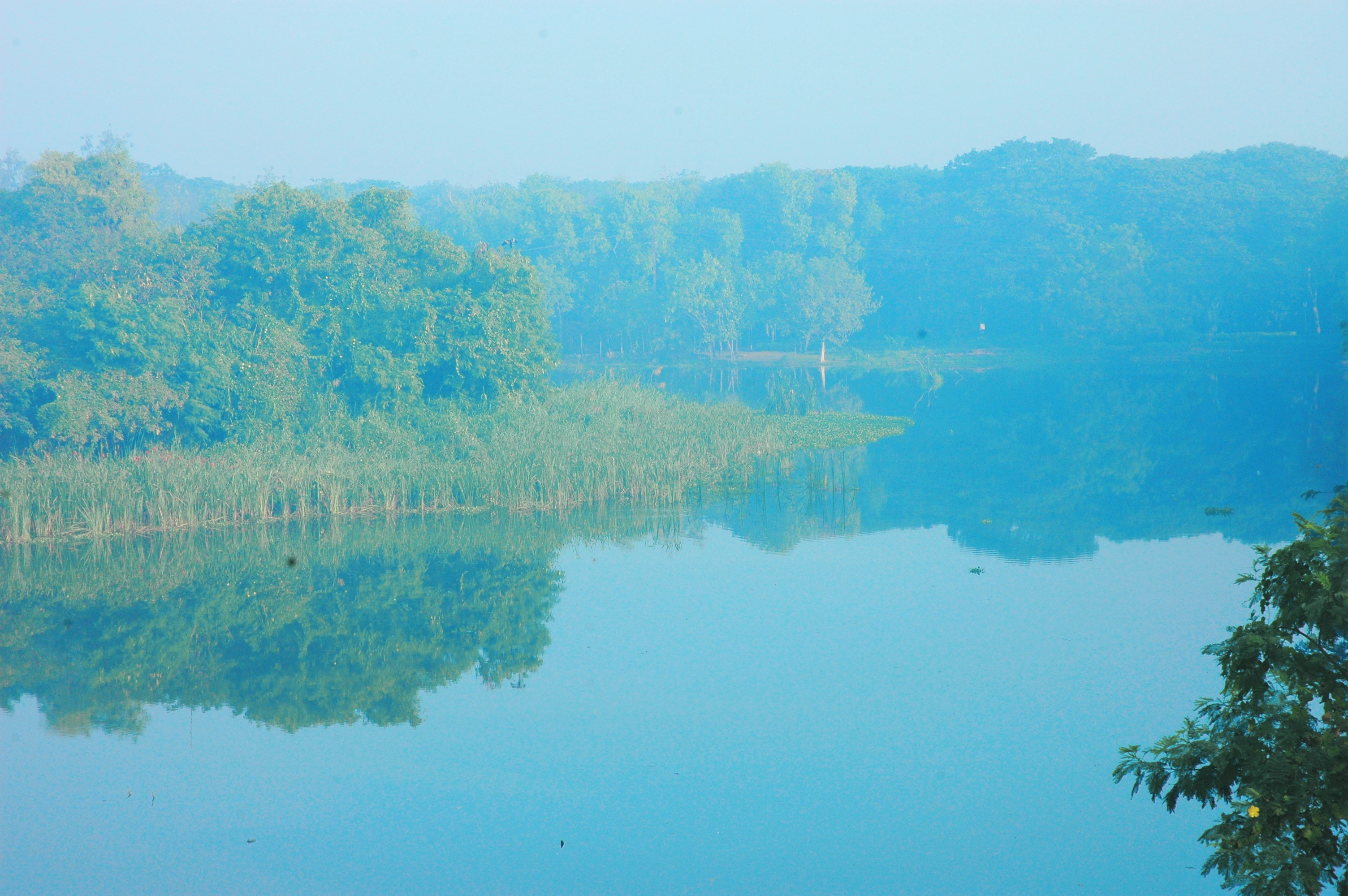
NTR Manasa Sarovaram park, Nandivelugu Road

In 2019, pollution levels in Guntur city were at a moderate level when compared with other major cities. There have been many efforts to increase awareness and keep the city clean, including a 100-day cleanup drive in 2021. A plastic-waste-to-fuel conversion plant was set up in the city; fuel from the plant was used for vehicles run by the GMC.

The GMC started using electric vehicles for domestic garbage collection in 2021. E-auto rickshaws were introduced in the city to reduce air and noise pollution; many electric charging stations have been set up across the city for this purpose. Efforts to reduce plastic use in the city and replace it with environment-friendly materials like jute, paper and cloth have been made.

In 2021, United Nations Human Settlement Program planners recommended implementation of larger parks, mass transit with metro trains and electric bus systems, and improvements to city expansion plans.

== Transport ==
Local transport in Guntur includes privately operated auto rickshaws, taxi cabs, minibuses and government-run APSRTC buses. Auto rickshaws operating on a sharing basis are the cheapest form of transport for students and workers. NTR bus station and an adjacent minibus station accommodate more than 2,000 buses every day, about half of them from depots in the erstwhile united district. Plans for e-Bus Bay centres in the city were proposed in 2021.

=== Roads ===
The city has a total of 893.00 km (554.88 mi) of roads. Mahatma Gandhi Inner Ring Road is a 6.34-kilometre (3.94 mi) arterial road that starts on National Highway 16. The inner ring road, along with Guntur Bypass, and sections of national and state highways, encircles the city. The arterial city roads include Grand Trunk Road, JKC College Road, Lakshmipuram Road, Pattabhipuram Road and Palakaluru Road. The GMC identified Amaravati Road, Lalapuram Road, Medical Club Road, Chuttugunta Road and Palakaluru Road for double-laning, and many other roads for widening to accommodate traffic.

National highways (NH), state highways (SH) and major district roads pass through Guntur. NH16, part of Asian Highway 45 and Golden Quadrilateral with Guntur Bypass connects to Chennai and Kolkata on the east coast of India. NH167A and SH2 connect Guntur with Macherla and Hyderabad. NH544D connects Guntur with Anantapur and towards Bengaluru on NH44. SH48 connects Guntur with the coast through Bapatla and Chirala. Major district roads link Guntur with Amaravati, Nandivelugu, Tenali, Mangalagiri, and Parchur.

=== Rail ===
Guntur's main railway stations are Guntur Junction, Nallapadu and New Guntur. Stations at Namburu, Perecherla and Pedakakani Halt serve as satellite stations. MEMU and local train services between Guntur and Vijayawada are used by thousands of university students and public. The Rail Vikas Bhavan building at Pattabhipuram is the headquarters of Guntur railway division. Guntur railway station is well connected with many of the major stations of India. Guntur City and the capital region are being planned to be part of India's bullet train projects connecting west and south of India.

=== Air ===
Vijayawada Airport, the nearest airport to Guntur, is 54 km (34 mi) away.

=== Gallery ===
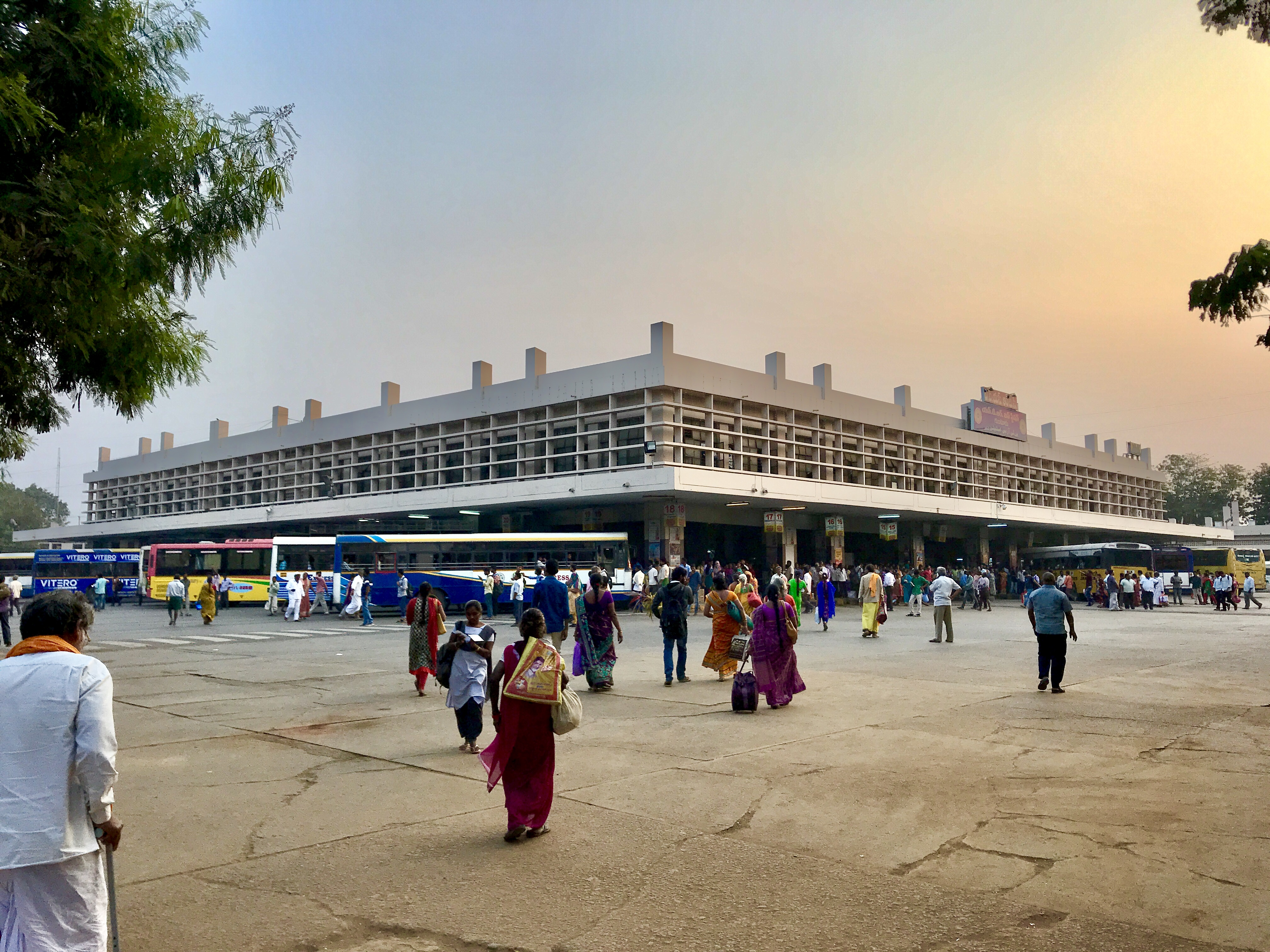
NTR Bus Station, Thamma Rangareddy Nagar

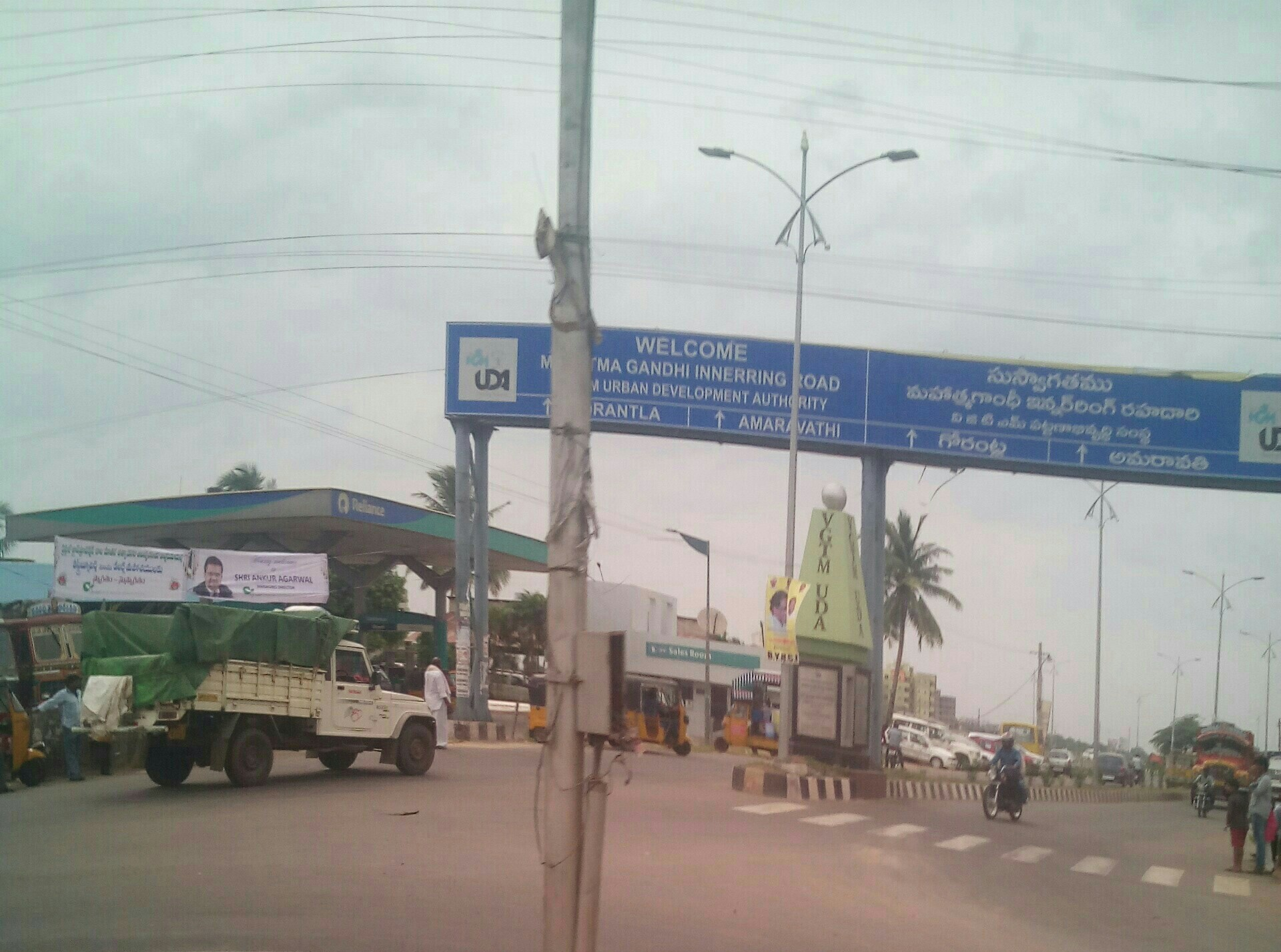
Mahatma Gandhi Inner Ring Road at its starting point of Autonagar on NH16

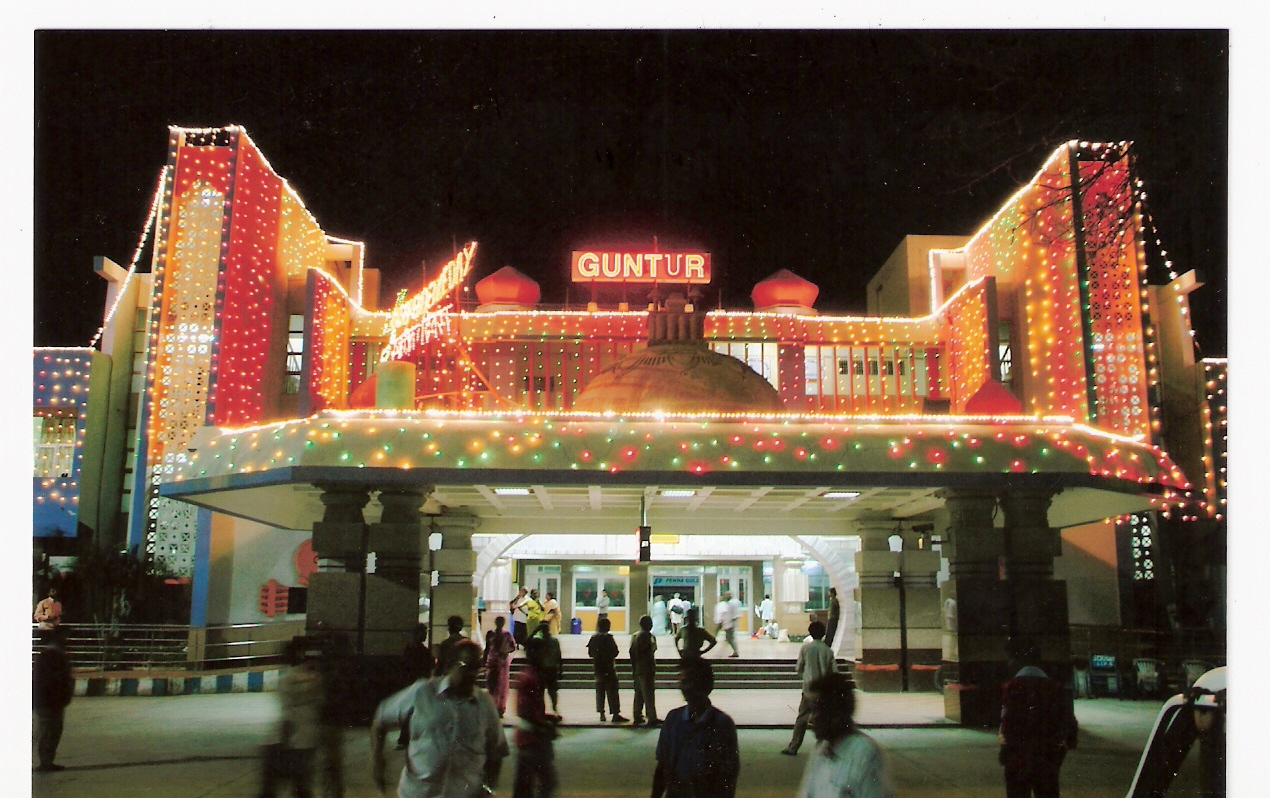
Guntur Junction railway station, Sambasivapet

== Education and research ==
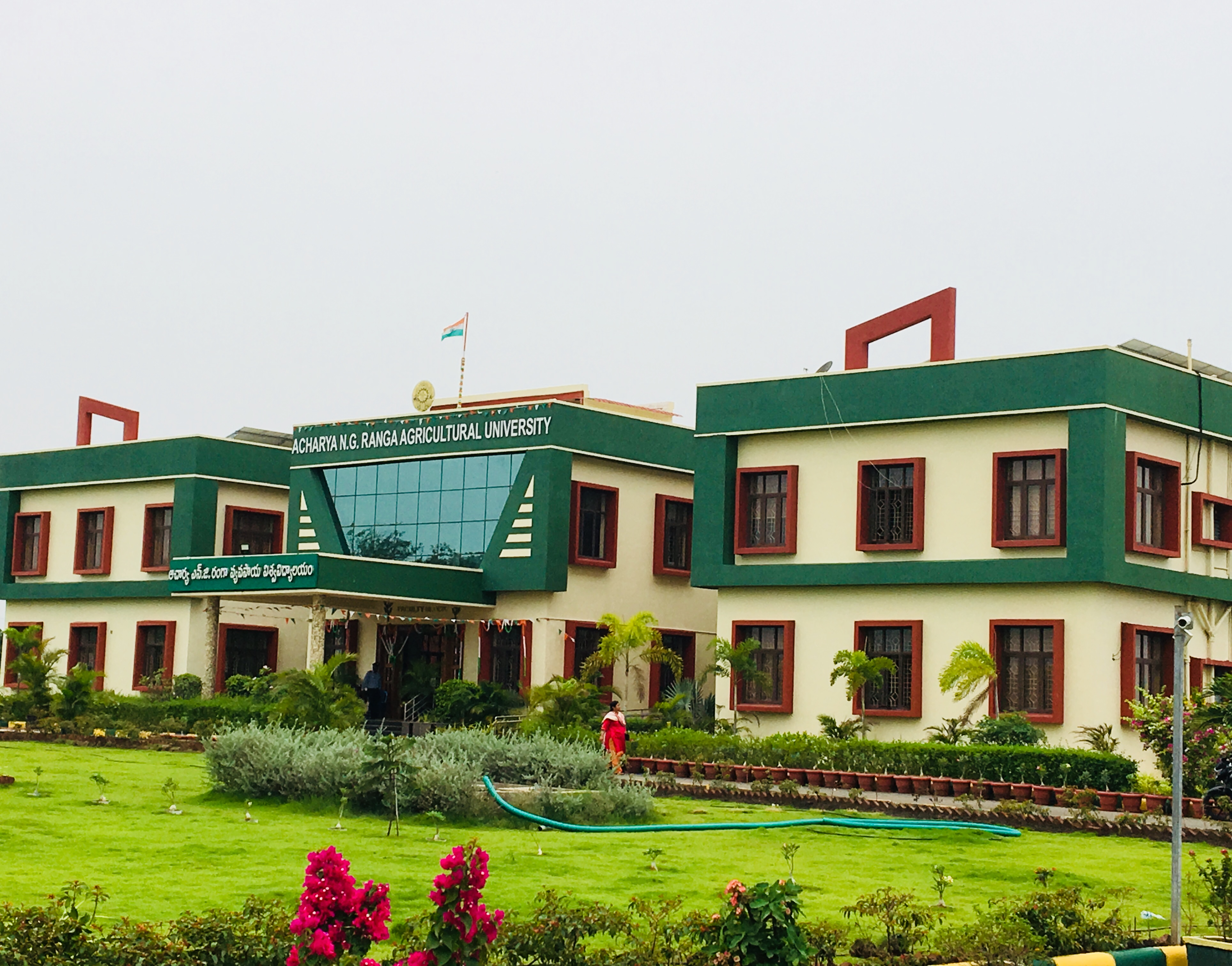
Guntur Agricultural University campus

Primary and secondary education is provided by government and private schools. Aided schools were either transferred to government or became private in 2020 as per a government mandate. According to the school information report for the academic year 2021–22, more than one lakh, thirty thousand (130,000) students were enrolled in over 450 schools in the city and about 695,476 students are enrolled in the schools in the district. The medium of instruction in municipal corporation schools was switched to English from the year 2016–2017.

The public library system in Guntur is supported by the government and the district central library is located at Arundelpet. Annamayya library was set up with 1 lakh books that were donated by bibliophile Lanka Suryanarayana.

Hindu College and Andhra Christian College were established during the British Raj for higher education. Jagarlamudi Kuppuswamy Chowdary College, RVR & JC College of Engineering, Tellakula Jalayya Polisetty Somasundaram College (TJPS College), Government College for Women and St. Joseph's College of Education for Women are autonomous colleges.

Guntur Medical College is one of the oldest medical colleges in the state. Several higher education institutes such as Vignan's Foundation for Science, Technology & Research, Katuri Medical College, All India Institute of Medical Sciences, Mangalagiri, Acharya Nagarjuna University and Acharya N. G. Ranga Agricultural University have campuses near the city. A new premier central research institute for Yoga and Naturopathy (CCRYN) is being planned to be set up in Guntur.

A regional Agmark laboratory, and a regional station of the Central Tobacco Research Institute of the Indian Council of Agricultural Research are located in Guntur. The city hosts many national, and state-level conferences and expos on the economy, agriculture and technology.

== Media ==
Eenadu, Sakshi and Andhra Jyothi are the most-popular Telugu daily newspapers in terms of circulation in the united Andhra Pradesh and the top-three Telugu news sites. The newspapers Surya and Vaartha are published from Guntur. The Hindu, The New Indian Express, The Hans India and Deccan Chronicle are a few of the English-language daily newspapers that are circulated in Guntur.

== Sports ==
Sporting infrastructure in Guntur includes Brahmananda Reddy Stadium for tennis, badminton, volleyball, athletics, and gymnastics; and NTR Municipal Indoor Stadium for table tennis and volleyball. A swimming pool is proposed to be added to Brahmananda Reddy Stadium and a boxing ring is being planned for NTR municipal stadium.

Guntur has hosted sporting events such as the All India Senior Tennis Association, the All India Sub Junior Ranking Badminton Tournament, the All India Invitation Volleyball Tournament, the Ganta Sanjeeva Reddy Memorial Trophy and the Inter-district Master Aquatic Championship. The city was also a host for the Khelo India programme for junior-level national sports in 2016. The city hosts mini-marathons and 10 km (6.2 mi) walks. International sports personalities from Guntur include cricketer Ambati Rayudu and badminton player Srikanth Kidambi.

== See also ==
- Guntur Municipal Corporation
- Guntur district
- Andhra Pradesh Capital Region Development Authority
- List of people from Guntur
- List of Indian metropolitan areas by GDP
