= Department of Urban Development and Housing, Jharkhand =

Department of Government of Jharkhand

Department of Urban Development and Housing
- नगर विकास एवं आवास विभाग

Department overview
- Jurisdiction: State of Jharkhand
- Headquarters: Project Building, Dhurwa Ranchi, Jharkhand; 23.29436°N 85.29298°E
- Minister responsible: Sudivya Kumar, Ministers of Urban Development and Housing
- Department executive: Sunil Kumar, IAS, Principal Secretary (Urban Development and Housing)
- Parent department: Government of Jharkhand
- Child agencies: Directorate of Municipal Administration; State Urban Development Agency; Jharkhand State Housing Board; (JUIDCO); (JUTCOL); Ranchi Smart City Corporation Limited
- Website: Official website

The Department of Urban Development and Housing, Jharkhand, (UDHD) is a department of the Government of Jharkhand responsible for urban planning, housing and municipal governance in the state. It oversees urban local bodies including municipal corporations, municipalities, nagar panchayats and notified area committees and implements schemes related to infrastructure, sanitation, water supply, solid waste management and housing for weaker sections. The department also prepares city development plans and master plans, that includes regularisation of unauthorized buildings, development of new townships in major cities, and measures like reduced water connection charges with free connections for below-poverty-line households.

== Functions ==
- Oversight of urban local bodies including municipal corporations, municipalities, nagar panchayats and notified area committees, including implementing schemes such as PMAY-Urban.
- Preparation and implementation of urban water supply schemes, including using Public Private Partnership models.
- Development of city sanitation plans covering water supply, access to toilets, waste water management, storm water drainage and solid waste management.
- Launching and providing various e-services such as building plan approval, property tax management, water connection management, municipal license system, issuance of birth and death certificates as well as grievance redressal.
- Implementation of reforms to strengthen accountability, transparency, and service monitoring, such as QR code / RFID-based tracking for waste collection.

== Ministerial team ==
The Department is headed by the Cabinet Minister for Urban Development and Housing. Since December 2024, Sudivya Kumar holds the portfolio of Urban Development and Housing Minister of Jharkhand.

The administrative head of the department is the principal secretary, who is supported by special secretaries and other senior officials. Since August 2024, Sunil Kumar, Indian Administrative Service is serving as Principal Secretary of Jharkhand's Urban Development and Housing Department.

== List of urban local bodies in Jharkhand ==
Jharkhand has four categories of urban local bodies: Municipal Corporations, Nagar Parishads (Municipality), Nagar Panchayats and a Notified Area Committee.

=== Municipal Corporations ===
- Adityapur Municipal Corporation
- Chas Municipal Corporation
- Dhanbad Municipal Corporation
- Deoghar Municipal Corporation
- Hazaribagh Municipal Corporation
- Ranchi Municipal Corporation
- Giridih Municipal Corporation
- Medininagar Municipal Corporation
- Mango Municipal Corporation

=== Nagar Parishads (Municipality) ===
- Bishrampur Nagar Parishad
- Chatra Nagar Parishad
- Chakradharpur Nagar Parishad
- Madhupur Nagar Parishad
- Chaibasa Nagar Parishad
- Dumka Nagar Parishad
- Garhwa Nagar Parishad
- Gumla Nagar Parishad
- Jhumritilaiya Nagar Parishad
- Ramgarh Nagar Parishad
- Simdega Nagar Parishad
- Sahibganj Nagar Parishad
- Pakur Nagar Parishad
- Phusro Nagar Parishad
- Mihijam Nagar Parishad
- Lohardaga Nagar Parishad
- Jugsalai Nagar Parishad
- Godda Nagar Parishad
- Chirkunda Nagar Parishad
- Kapali Nagar Parishad

=== Nagar Panchayats ===
- Basukinath Nagar Panchayat
- Bachra Nagar Panchayat
- Badakisarai Nagar Panchayat
- Barharwa Nagar Panchayat
- Bundu Nagar Panchayat
- Chhattarpur Nagar Panchayat
- Chakuliya Nagar Panchayat
- Domchach Nagar Panchayat
- Hariharganj Nagar Panchayat
- Hussainabad Nagar Panchayat
- Jamtara Nagar Panchayat
- Khunti Nagar Panchayat
- Koderma Nagar Panchayat
- Latehar Nagar Panchayat
- Mahagama Nagar Panchayat
- Nagar Uttari Nagar Panchayat
- Rajmahal Nagar Panchayat
- Seraikela Nagar Panchayat
- Manjhiaon Nagar Panchayat

=== Notified Area Committee (NAC) ===
- Jamshedpur NAC

Recruitment

UDHD follows Jharkhand Nagarpalika Sewa Samvarg( Municipal Cadre).It held its first AE/SDO recruitment through Jharkhand Public Service Commission through Advertisement no 08/2018 with ROHIT SINGH secured first rank in the state, who hails from bokaro.

== See also ==
- Government of Jharkhand
- Jharkhand Urban Infrastructure Development Company Limited
- List of urban local bodies in Jharkhand
- Municipal corporation (India)
- Municipal governance in India
- Ministry of Housing and Urban Affairs
