= List of urban local bodies in Jharkhand =

Jharkhand is administratively divided into 5 divisions and 24 districts. For the administration of urban areas, Jharkhand currently has 48 Urban Local Bodies (ULBs) consisting of 9 Municipal Corporations, 20 Municipal Councils (Nagar Parishads), 19 Nagar Panchayats (Town Councils) and 1 Notified Area Committee.

These ULBs in Jharkhand are administered in accordance with the Jharkhand Municipal Act, 2011 and operate under the Department of Urban Development and Housing, Government of Jharkhand.

The Jharkhand State Election Commission is responsible for conducting elections to the posts of Mayor, Deputy Mayor, Chairperson, Vice-Chairperson and Ward Councillors in urban local bodies across the state.

== List of Municipal Corporations ==
There are 9 Municipal Corporations (Nagar Nigam) in Jharkhand.

#	Corporation Name	City	District	Area (km^{2})	Population (2011)	No. of Wards	Year Established	Last Election	Website
1	Ranchi Municipal Corporation	Ranchi	Ranchi	175.12	1,073,427	55	1979	2026	
2	Dhanbad Municipal Corporation	Dhanbad	Dhanbad	355.77	1,333,719	55	2006	2026	
3	Chas Municipal Corporation	Chas	Bokaro	29.98	156,888	35	2015	2026	
4	Deoghar Municipal Corporation	Deoghar	Deoghar	119.70	203,123	36	2010	2026	
5	Adityapur Municipal Corporation	Adityapur	Seraikela Kharsawan	49.00	174,355	35	2015	2026	
6	Mango Municipal Corporation	Mango	East Singhbhum	18.03	224,002	36	2017	2026	
7	Hazaribagh Municipal Corporation	Hazaribagh	Hazaribagh	53.94	197466	36	2015	2026	
8	Medininagar Municipal Corporation	Medininagar	Palamu	50.52	158,941	35	2015	2026	
9	Giridih Municipal Corporation	Giridih	Giridih	87.4	143,529	36	2015	2026	

== List of Municipal Councils ==
There are 20 Municipal Councils (Nagar Parishads) in Jharkhand.

#	Municipal Council Name	District	No. of Wards	Website
1	Madhupur Municipal Council	Deoghar	23	Official website
2	Garhwa Municipal Council	Garhwa	21	Official website
3	Bishrampur Municipal Council	Palamu	20	Official website
4	Chatra Municipal Council	Chatra	22	Official website
5	Dumka Municipal Council	Dumka	21	Official website
6	Godda Municipal Council	Godda	21	Official website
7	Sahibganj Municipal Council	Sahibganj	28	Official website
8	Pakur Municipal Council	Pakur	21	Official website
9	Jhumritilaiya Municipal Council	Koderma	28	Official website
10	Mihijam Municipal Council	Jamtara	20	Official website
11	Chirkunda Municipal Council	Dhanbad	21	Official website
12	Phusro Municipal Council	Bokaro	28	Official website
13	Ramgarh Municipal Council	Ramgarh	32	Official website
14	Lohardaga Municipal Council	Lohardaga	23	Official website
15	Gumla Municipal Council	Gumla	22	Official website
16	Simdega Municipal Council	Simdega	20	Official website
17	Chakradharpur Municipal Council	West Singhbhum	23	Official website
18	Chaibasa Municipal Council	West Singhbhum	21	Official website
19	Kapali Municipal Council	Seraikela Kharsawan	21	Official website
20	Jugsalai Municipal Council	East Singhbhum	22	Official website

== List of Nagar Panchayats ==
There are 19 Nagar Panchayats in Jharkhand.

#	Nagar Panchayat Name	No. of Wards
1	Koderma Nagar Panchayat	15
2	Jamtara Nagar Panchayat	16
3	Latehar Nagar Panchayat	15
4	Shri Banshidhar Nagar Nagar Panchayat	17
5	Majhion Nagar Panchayat	12
6	Hussainabad Nagar Panchayat	16
7	Hariharganj Nagar Panchayat	16
8	Chhatarpur Nagar Panchayat	16
9	Domchanch Nagar Panchayat	14
10	Barkatha Nagar Panchayat	12
11	Dhanwar Nagar Panchayat	11
12	Mahatama Gandhi Nagar Panchayat	17
13	Rajmahal Nagar Panchayat	14
14	Barharwa Nagar Panchayat	14
15	Basukinath Nagar Panchayat	12
16	Bundu Nagar Panchayat	13
17	Khunti Nagar Panchayat	19
18	Saraikela Nagar Panchayat	11
19	Chakulia Nagar Panchayat	12

== List of Notified Area Committee (NAC) ==
There is only one NAC in Jharkhand.

- Jamshedpur Notified Area Committee

== See also ==
- Government of
- Department of Urban Development and Housing, Jharkhand
- Local government in India
- Municipal corporation (India)
- Municipality
- Seventy-fourth Amendment of the Constitution of India
