= Deoghar Municipal Corporation =

Local governing body of Deoghar

Deoghar Municipal Corporation देवघर नगर निगम
- Emblem of the Deoghar Municipal Corporation

History
- Founded: 2010; 16 years ago

Leadership
- Mayor: Ravi Kumar Raut
- Deputy Mayor: Tip Chatterjee
- Municipal Commissioner: Sulochana Meena, IAS
- Seats: 36

Elections
- Last election: 2026
- Next election: 2031

Meeting place
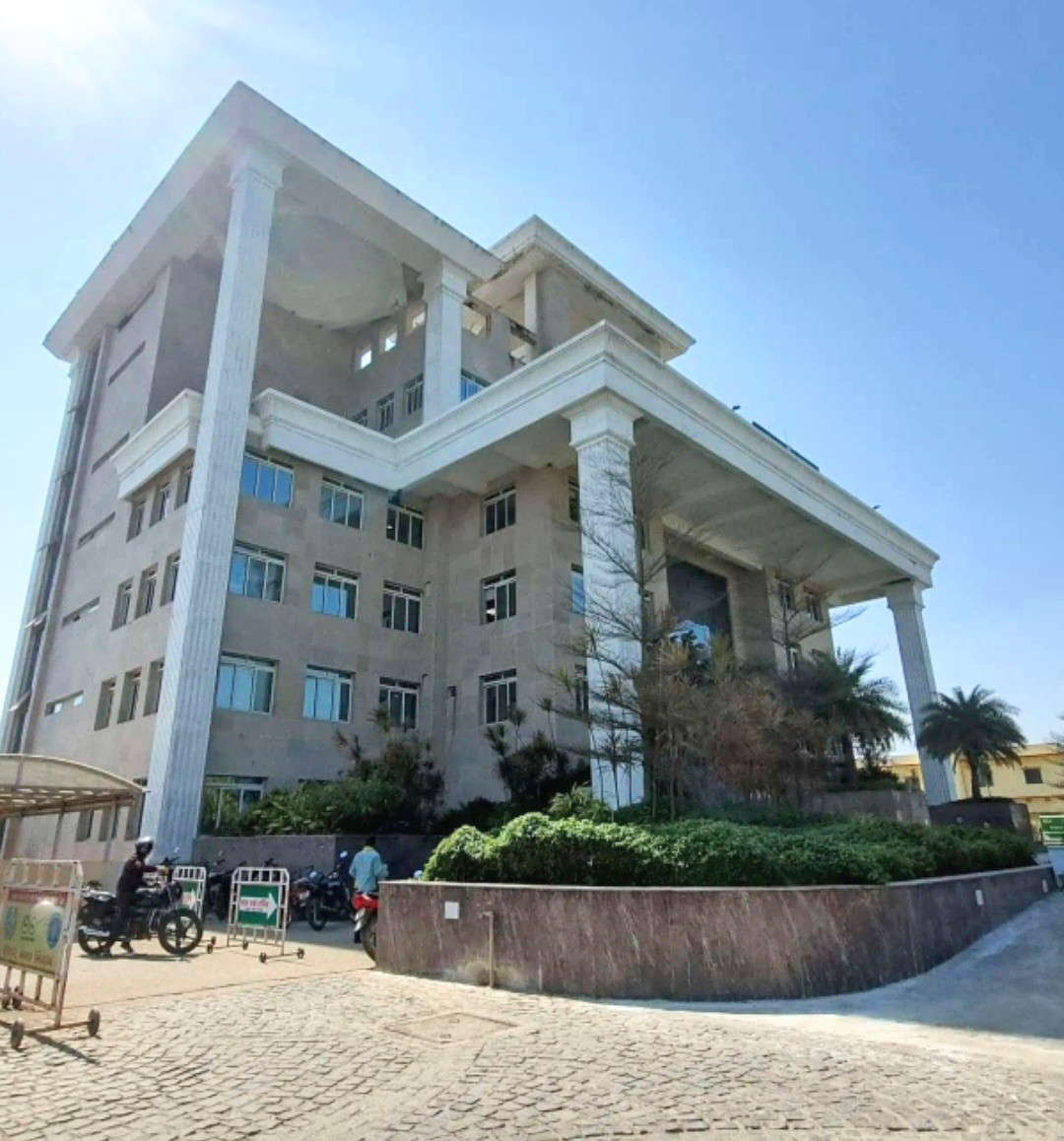
- Court Road, Deoghar, Jharkhand, India - 814112

Website
- udhd.jharkhand.gov.in/ulb/deoghar/Deoghar.aspx

Deoghar Municipal Corporation (DMC) is the civic body that governs the city of Deoghar and the surrounding areas in Deoghar subdivision of Deoghar district, Jharkhand, India. Established in 2010 by a Special Act, brought by the Government of Jharkhand, Deoghar Municipal Corporation is headed by the Mayor of the city and governed by a Commissioner. It functions under the provisions of the Jharkhand Municipal Act, 2011 and has been formed to improve the city's infrastructure and cleanliness.

== History ==
The Deoghar Municipal Corporation was officially established on 26 June, 2010 following the merger of the Deoghar Municipality and the Jasidih Notified Area Committee (NAC). This reorganization was executed by Government of Jharkhand, which empowers the state government to designate urban areas as Municipal Corporations based on criteria such as population size and infrastructure requirements.

Prior to the merger, Deoghar functioned as a municipality, while Jasidih operated as a NAC. The restructuring aimed to streamline urban governance and enhance service delivery in the region. Following the merger, Deoghar also became one of the Municipal Corporations in Jharkhand.

In 2019, Deoghar Municipal Corporation received a national Swachhta Excellency Award which was presented by the Prime Minister of India. The recognition was based on assessments of cleanliness, community participation and sanitation facilities under the Swachh Bharat Mission.

In October 2020, the newly constructed building of the Deoghar Municipal Corporation was inaugurated by Chief Minister, Hemant Soren. Built at an estimated cost of 21 crore by the Jharkhand Urban Development Corporation Limited, the building covers approximately 89,993 square feet, making it one of the largest civic structures in Jharkhand. It features modern amenities, including a park, a fountain and a rainwater harvesting system, designed to support administrative functions while incorporating sustainable infrastructure practices.

== Administrative setup ==
The provision of Jharkhand Municipal Act 2011 defines the power of Deoghar Municipal Corporation. The corporation consists of 36 municipal wards, each represented by an elected councillor. The elected body is headed by a Mayor and a Deputy Mayor. In addition, the Municipal Commissioner, appointed by the state government, oversees the administrative functions of the corporation.

Since July 2024, Rohit Sinha is the current Municipal Commissioner of Deoghar Municipal Corporation.

The administrative role of the Deoghar Municipal Corporation includes:

- Implementation of decisions taken by the elected council.
- Management of urban services and infrastructure within city limits.
- Supervising day to day municipal governance through officials and staff.

== Functions ==
Deoghar Municipal Corporation is created for the following functions:

- Solid waste management.
- Street light management.
- Approval of construction of new building and regulation of land use.
- Issuance of birth and death certificate.
- Construction and maintenance of municipal roads and drains.
- Slum Management & encroachment removal.
- Development & maintenance of burial grounds and crematoriums.
- Regulation of slaughter houses.
- Prevention of food adulteration.
- Preventive health care.
- Management of storm water and waste water drainage.

== Revenue ==
The following are the Income sources for the Corporation from the Central and State Government.

=== Revenue from taxes ===
Following is the Tax related revenue for the corporation:

- Property tax.
- Profession tax.
- Entertainment tax.
- Grants from Central and State

Government like Goods and Services Tax.

- Advertisement tax.

=== Revenue from non-tax sources ===
Following is the Non Tax related revenue for the corporation:

- Water usage charges.
- Fees from Documentation services.
- Rent received from municipal property.
- Funds from municipal bonds.

== List of ward councillors ==
The following are the ward councillors elected in the 2026 Deoghar Municipal Corporation election:

Ward No.	Councillor	Reservation
1	Sandeep Kumar	Extremely Backward Class-I
2	Pratima Devi	Unreserved
3	Kishore Kumar Rao	Extremely Backward Class-I
4	Pankaj Paswan	Scheduled Caste
5	Tipu Verma	Unreserved
6	Reema Singh	Unreserved
7	Ruby Kumari	Scheduled Caste
8	Manju Devi	Unreserved
9	Mo. Sarfaraz Sheikh	Extremely Backward Class-I
10	Budhni Devi	Extremely Backward Class-I
11	Kiran Verma	Extremely Backward Class-I
12	Anup Kumar	Backward Class-II
13	Ranjan Kumar	Unreserved
14	Rashimun Devi	Unreserved
15	Dinesh Kumar	Unreserved
16	Maya Devi	Unreserved
17	Kiran Kumari	Scheduled Caste
18	Shailja Devi	Unreserved
19	Soni Kesari	Backward Class-II
20	Chandni Chaudhary	Backward Class-II
21	Bharti Devi	Unreserved
22	Apna Jha	Unreserved
23	Shailesh Charan Mishra	Unreserved
24	Sangita Kumari	Unreserved
25	Suman Kumari	Unreserved
26	Umeshwar Das	Scheduled Caste
27	Radhika Devi	Backward Class-II
28	Pratima Devi	Unreserved
29	Avesh Jyoti	Backward Class-II
30	Gopi Kumar Gupta	Backward Class-II
31	Preeti Narone	Unreserved
32	Vishal Kumar Saraf	Backward Class-II
33	Anoj Kumar Rao	Extremely Backward Class-I
34	Sahida Bibi	Extremely Backward Class-I
35	Pradeep Kumar Chaudhary	Unreserved
36	Kartik Prasad Yadav	Unreserved

== See also ==
- Ranchi Municipal Corporation
- Dhanbad Municipal Corporation
- Giridih Municipal Corporation
- Medininagar Municipal Corporation
- List of urban local bodies in Jharkhand
