= Guntur-I Assembly constituency =

Defunct constituency of the Andhra Pradesh legislative Assembly, India

Coordinates: 16.32°N 80.41°E

Guntur-I
- Former constituency No. 100 for the Andhra Pradesh Legislative Assembly

Constituency details
- Country: India
- Region: South India
- State: Andhra Pradesh
- District: Guntur
- Lok Sabha constituency: Guntur
- Established: 1955
- Abolished: 2008
- Reservation: None

Guntur-I Assembly constituency was a constituency of the Andhra Pradesh Legislative Assembly, India until the 2008 delimitation in Guntur district.

== Members of the Legislative Assembly (Guntur – Madras State) ==
Year	Member	Political party
1952	Nadimpalli Venkata Lakshmi Narasimha Rao	Kisan Mazdoor Praja Party

== Members of the Legislative Assembly (Guntur-I) ==
Year	Member	Political party
1955	Tellakula Jalayya	Indian National Congress
1962	Kanaparthi Nagaiah	Communist Party of India
1967	S. Ankamma	Indian National Congress
1972	Vijay Ramanujam	Indian National Congress
1978	Lingamsetty Eswararao	Indian National Congress (I)
1983	Umaru Kanu Patanu	Telugu Desam Party
1985	Mohammad Jani	Indian National Congress
1989	Mohammad Jani	Indian National Congress
1994	S.M. Ziauddin	Telugu Desam Party
1999	S.M. Ziauddin	Telugu Desam Party
2004	Shaik Subani	Indian National Congress

== Election results (Guntur – Madras State) ==
=== 1952 ===
1952 Madras State Legislative Assembly election: Guntur
Party	Candidate	Votes	%	±%
KMPP	Nadimpalli Venkata Lakshmi Narasimha Rao	14,447	30.13%	
CPI	Yangalasetty Tirupatayya	11,704	24.41%	
Margin of victory		2,743	5.72%	
Turnout		47,949	62.46%	
Registered electors		76,772		
KMPP win (new seat)				

== Election results (Guntur-I) ==
=== 1955 ===
1955 Andhra State Legislative Assembly election: Guntur-I
Party	Candidate	Votes	%	±%
INC	Tellakula Jalayya	13,413	32.60%	
CPI	Devisetti Venkata Apparao	11,998	29.16%	
Margin of victory		1,415	3.44%	
Turnout		41,140	47.09%	
Registered electors		87,369		
INC gain from KMPP		Swing		

=== 1962 ===
1962 Andhra Pradesh Legislative Assembly election: Guntur-I
Party	Candidate	Votes	%	±%
CPI	Kanaparthi Nagaiah	32,001	52.38%	
INC	Amamcherla Seshachalapathi Rao	25,044	40.99%	
Margin of victory		6,957	11.39%	
Turnout		62,569	74.18%	
Registered electors		84,352		
CPI gain from INC		Swing		

=== 1967 ===
1967 Andhra Pradesh Legislative Assembly election: Guntur-I
Party	Candidate	Votes	%	±%
INC	S Ankamma	18,506	38.19%	
CPI	K Mallaiahlingam	24,885	43.04%	
Margin of victory		8,046	13.92%	
Turnout		60,013	73.27%	
Registered electors		81,904		
INC gain from CPI		Swing		

=== 1972 ===
1972 Andhra Pradesh Legislative Assembly election: Guntur-I
Party	Candidate	Votes	%	±%
INC	Vijaya Ramanujam	19,223	39.15%	
CPI	K Mallaiahlingam	14,921	30.39%	
Margin of victory		4,302	8.76%	
Turnout		49,750	56.63%	
Registered electors		87,851		
INC hold		Swing		

=== 1978 ===
1978 Andhra Pradesh Legislative Assembly election: Guntur-I
Party	Candidate	Votes	%	±%
INC(I)	Eswara Rao Lingamsety	40,901	51.13%	
JP	Abdullah Khan Mohammad	25,341	31.68%	
Margin of victory		15,560	19.45%	
Turnout		81,168	72.87%	
Registered electors		111,383		
INC(I) gain from INC		Swing		

=== 1983 ===
1983 Andhra Pradesh Legislative Assembly election: Guntur-I
Party	Candidate	Votes	%	±%
TDP	Umaru Kanu Patanu	62,883	67.69%	
INC	Eswara Rao Lingamsetty	21,519	23.17%	
Margin of victory		41,364	44.53%	
Turnout		94,574	69.50%	
Registered electors		136,081		
TDP gain from INC(I)		Swing		

=== 1985 ===
1985 Andhra Pradesh Legislative Assembly election: Guntur-I
Party	Candidate	Votes	%	±%
INC	Mohammad Jani	46,196	50.34%	
TDP	Shaik Syed Saheb	43,765	47.69%	
Margin of victory		2431	2.65%	
Turnout		92,765	63.47%	
Registered electors		146,152		
INC gain from TDP		Swing		

=== 1989 ===
1989 Andhra Pradesh Legislative Assembly election: Guntur-I
Party	Candidate	Votes	%	±%
INC	Mohammad Jani	62,388	58.32%	
TDP	Shaik Syed Saheb	43,177	40.36%	
Margin of victory		19,211	17.96%	
Turnout		109,158	64.47%	
Registered electors		169,321		
INC hold		Swing		

=== 1994 ===
1994 Andhra Pradesh Legislative Assembly election: Guntur-I
Party	Candidate	Votes	%	±%
TDP	Ziauddin SM	53,745	47.56%	
INC	Mohammad Jani	26,795	23.71%	
Margin of victory		26,795	23.71%	
Turnout		114,499	62.85%	
Registered electors		182,168		
TDP gain from INC		Swing		

=== 1999 ===
1999 Andhra Pradesh Legislative Assembly election: Guntur-I
Party	Candidate	Votes	%	±%
TDP	Ziauddin SM	56,439	49.97%	
INC	Mohammad Jani	50,342	44.57%	
Margin of victory		6,097	5.40%	
Turnout		114,784	57.18%	
Registered electors		200,756		
TDP hold		Swing		

=== 2004 ===
2004 Andhra Pradesh Legislative Assembly election: Guntur-I
Party	Candidate	Votes	%	±%
INC	Shaik Subani	70,353	65.57%	
TDP	Ziauddin SM	34,389	32.05%	
Margin of victory		35,964	33.52%	
Turnout		107329	58.31%	
Registered electors		184,068		
INC gain from TDP		Swing		

== See also ==
- List of constituencies of Andhra Pradesh Legislative Assembly
- Guntur East Assembly constituency
