= Jonnalagadda =

Jonnalagadda may refer to:

== Places ==
- Jonnalagadda, Guntur district, a village in the Guntur district of Andhra Pradesh, India

== People ==
- Jonnalagadda Venkata Ramana Murthi (1933–2016), Indian stage and film actor
- Jonnalagadda Venkata Somayajulu (1928–2004), Indian actor known for his works in Telugu cinema and a few Tamil and Hindi films
- Jonnalagadda Gurappa Chetty (born 1937), Indian painter, craftsman and writer
- Siddu Jonnalagadda, Indian actor
