= Nadimpalli Venkata Lakshmi Narasimha Rao =

Indian politician

- Nadimpalli Narasimha Rao
- Born: 1 January 1890; Guntur in the Guntur district of present day Andhra Pradesh, India
- Died: 16 January 1978 (aged 87); Guntur, Andhra Pradesh
- Other names: Guntur Kesari
- Education: M.A. Economics, Barrister
- Alma mater: Andhra Christian College, The University of Edinburgh, Lincoln's Inn
- Organization(s): Guntur Municipal Corporation, Indian National Congress
- Movement: Indian independence movement

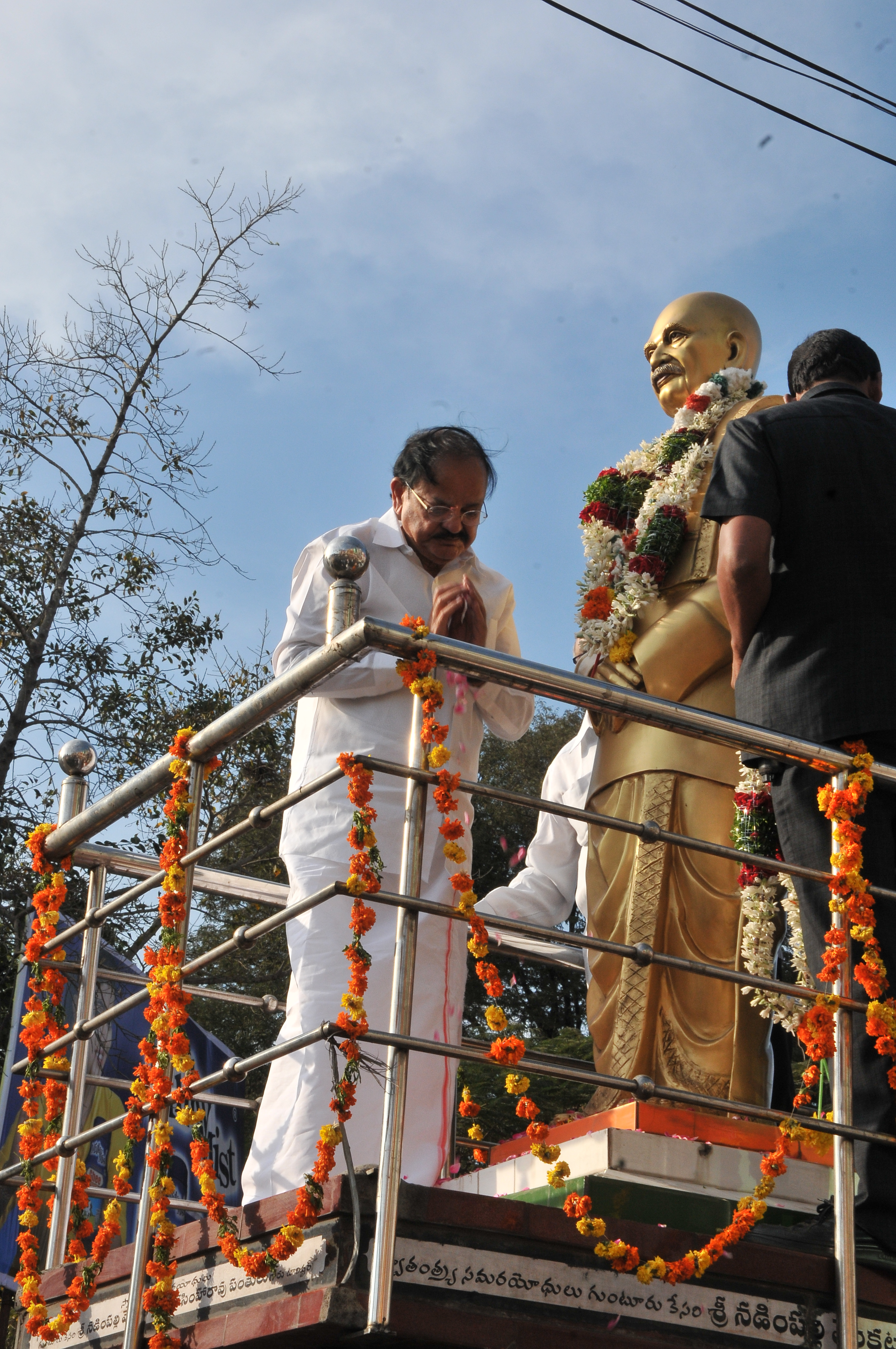
M. Venkaiah Naidu with the statue of Nadimpalli Venkata Lakshmi Narsimharao in Guntur

Nadimpalli Venkata Lakshmi Narasimha Rao (1 January 1890 – 16 January 1978) (often known as N.V.L.) of Guntur popularly known as "Guntur Kesari" was an Indian freedom fighter who worked in tandem with "Andhra Kesari" Tanguturi Prakasam Pantulu. In 1953 he acted as pro tem speaker of the Andhra Pradesh Legislative Assembly.

== Early life and education ==
He was born on 1 January 1890 in Guntur to parents Ramaiah and Lakshmamma.

After graduating from Andhra Christian College in Guntur he travelled to England with his childhood friend Duggirala Gopalakrishnayya (Andhra Ratna) where he studied for his M.A. Hons (Economics) at Edinburgh University. He was then called to the bar at Lincoln's Inn.

== Career ==
In 1915, he enrolled in the Madras High Court.He joined the office as a junior to Tanguturi Prakasam (Andhra Kesari). He was nominated as chairman of Guntur Municipal Council by Shri Motilal Nehru, After he gave a welcome address to the committee led by Motilal Nehru defying the orders of the British Collector.

In 1922, N.V.L Narasimharao was the first person to hoist the Flag of India during British rule when he did so on the Guntur Municipality building.

== Jinnah Tower ==
The Jinnah Tower project, initiated under the visionary leadership of NVL Narasimha Rao, aimed to promote communal harmony and bridge cultural divides within the city.

== Salt Satyagraha in Coastal Andhra ==
In 1930 he actively participated in the Salt March in Coastal Andhra, led by Mahatma Gandhi. As a Chairman of Municipality he made all employees volunteers to the Salt Satyagraha.

== Andhra Legislative Assembly ==
In 1953, just after the formation of the state of Andhra Pradesh, when Kurnool was the capital, he was made pro tem speaker of the newly formed Andhra Pradesh Legislative Assembly.
