= Reddypalem, Guntur =

Reddypalem
- Neighbourhood
- Location in Andhra Pradesh, India
- Coordinates: 16°19′24″N 80°26′59″E
- Country: India
- State: Andhra Pradesh
- District: Guntur
- Suburban: Guntur

Languages
  - Official: Telugu
- Time zone: UTC+5:30 (IST)

Reddypalem is a neighbourhood of Guntur in the Indian state of Andhra Pradesh. It was merged in Guntur Municipal Corporation in 2012 and is a part of Guntur East mandal (formerly Guntur mandal).
