= Guntur East mandal =

Guntur East
- Mandal
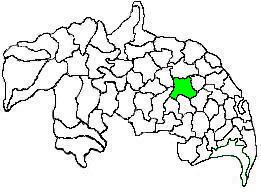
- Undivided Guntur urban mandal (East and West) in Guntur district
- Interactive map of Guntur East
- Location in Andhra Pradesh, India
- Coordinates: 16.3008°N 80.4428°E
- Country: India
- State: Andhra Pradesh
- District: Guntur
- Headquarters: Guntur

Government
  - Tehsildar: Tata Mohan Rao

Population (2011)
  - Total: 779,289

Languages
  - Official: Telugu
- Time zone: UTC+5:30 (IST)

Guntur East mandal is one of the 18 mandals in the Guntur district of the Indian state of Andhra Pradesh. It is under the administration of Guntur revenue division and was formed by bifurcating Guntur urban mandal into Guntur East and Guntur West, with its headquarters at Guntur.

== Governance ==
The mandal is under the administration of a tahsildar. It forms part of the Andhra Pradesh Capital Region, under the jurisdiction of the APCRDA. Guntur East assembly constituency represents the state assembly and it is a segment of the Guntur Lok sabha constituency.

== Settlements ==
Guntur East mandal covers the eastern part of Guntur Municipal Corporation and its urban agglomerations namely, Budampadu, Etukur, Gorantla, Guntur East constituency, Jonnalagadda, Reddypalem. Except Jonnalagadda, all other areas were already de-notified and merged with Guntur Municipal Corporation in 2012.

== See also ==
- List of mandals in Andhra Pradesh
- Villages in Guntur mandal
