= Rabindra Bhawan, Ranchi =

Cultural centre in Ranchi, India

Rabindra Bhawan
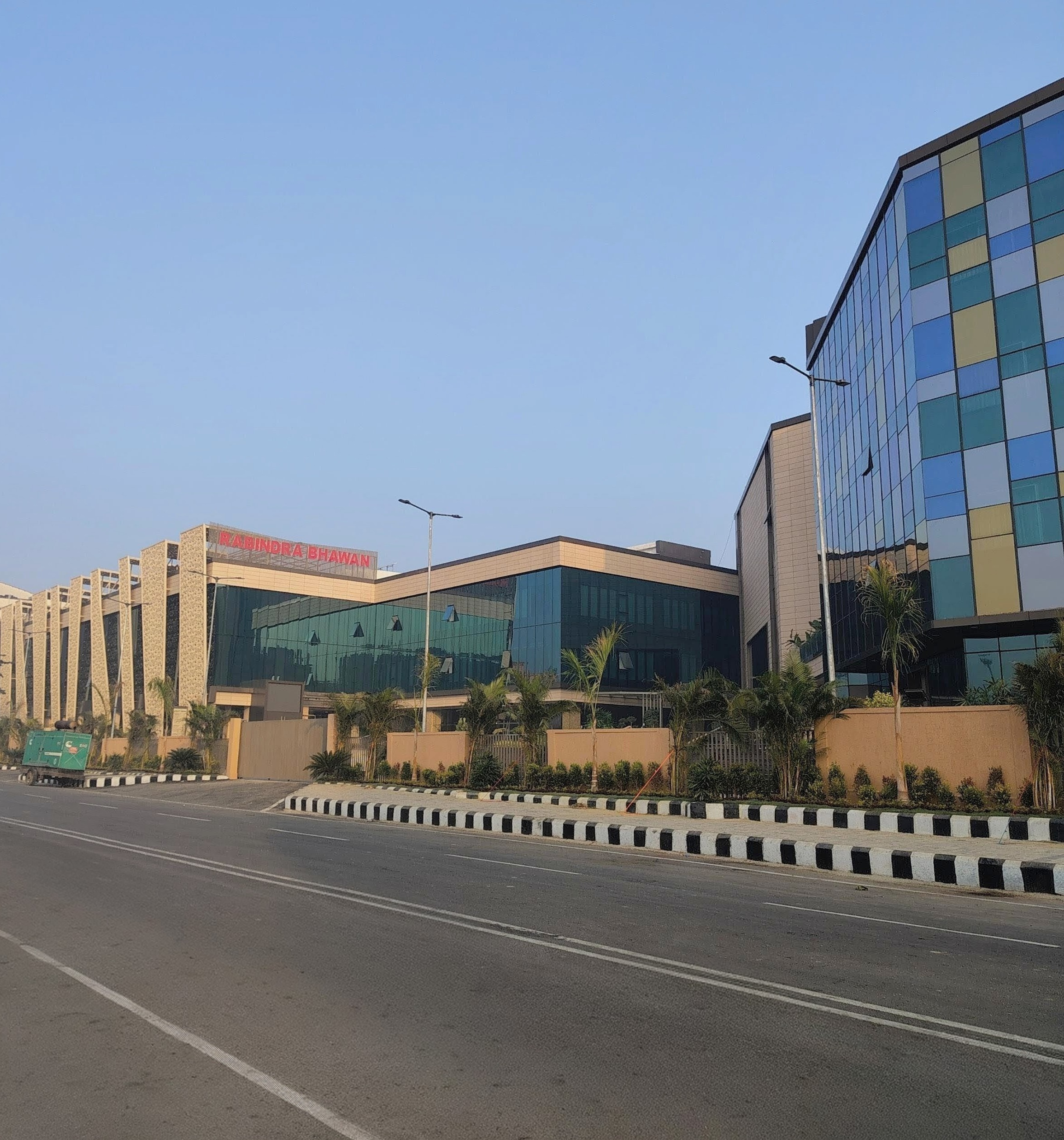
- Interactive map of the Rabindra Bhawan area

General information
- Type: Culture
- Architectural style: Modern
- Location: Kutchery Chowk, Ranchi, Jharkhand, India
- Coordinates: 23.3761583°N 85.3236836°E
- Owner: Government of Jharkhand

Technical details
- Floor area: 12,500 square metres (3.08 acres)

Other information
- Seating capacity: 1500

Rabindra Bhawan is an upcoming cultural centre located near Kutchery Chowk in Ranchi, Jharkhand. The complex is dedicated to Rabindranath Tagore, the Nobel laureate poet, writer and philosopher. Developed by JUIDCO, it is intended to promote performing arts, literature, and cultural activities in the state. The foundation stone was laid on 2 April 2017 by the then President of India, Pranab Mukherjee, in the presence of the Chief Minister of Jharkhand, Raghubar Das. Construction of the complex is almost complete and it is currently awaiting an official inauguration date for opening.

== History ==
The plan to construct a modern cultural complex in Ranchi originated as part of the state government’s efforts to create a dedicated space for large cultural events and replace the aging Town Hall facilities. The project was formally launched on 2 April 2017, when the foundation stone for Rabindra Bhawan was laid by Pranab Mukherjee, then President of India, in the presence of Raghubar Das, the Chief Minister of Jharkhand at the time. The complex was taken up for development by the Jharkhand Urban Infrastructure Development Corporation (JUIDCO).

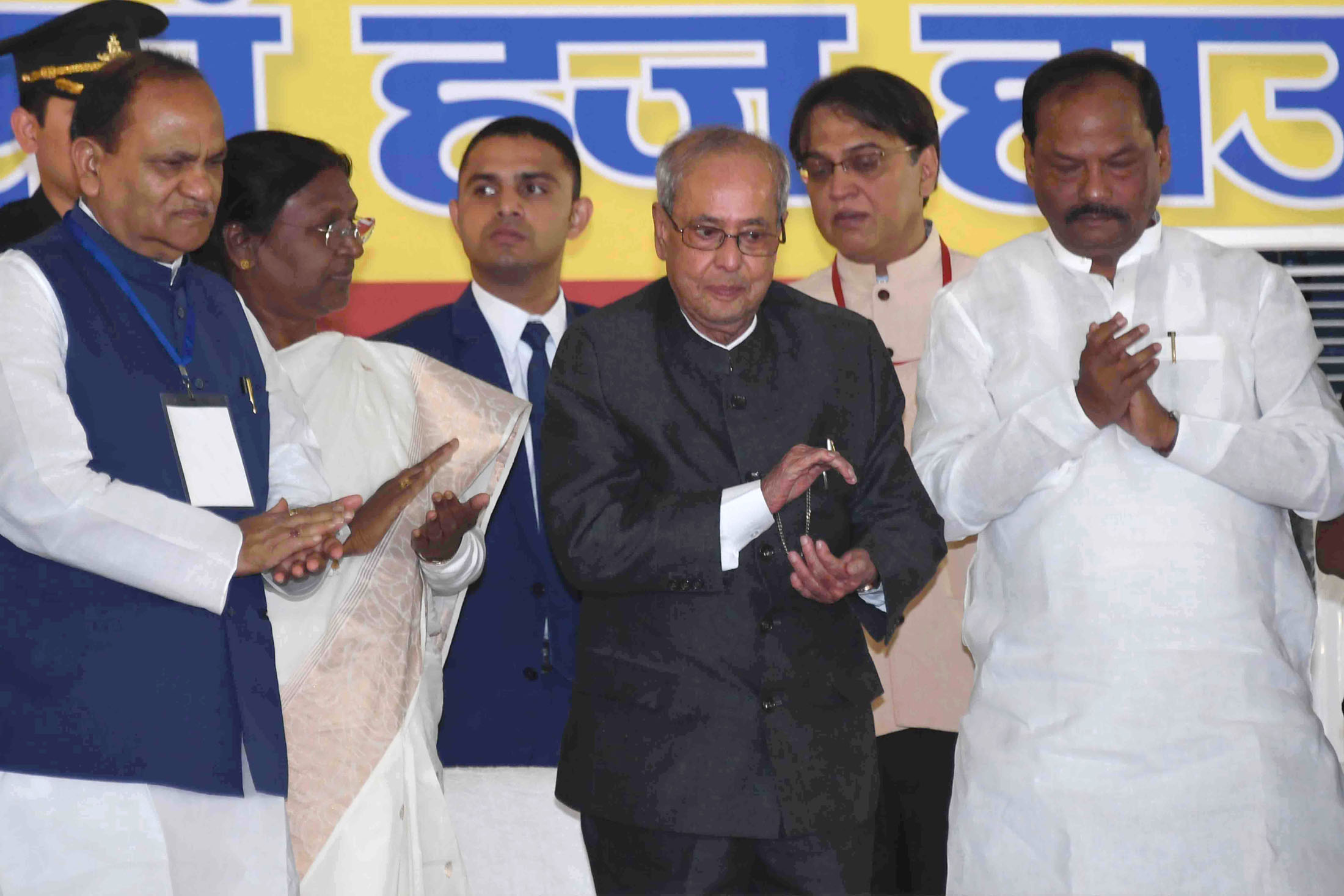
The President, Pranab Mukherjee laying the foundation stone at Ranchi

Construction progressed in phases, with several revisions made to the architectural and interior design plans. The inauguration faced multiple postponements due to design related changes, including adjustments to the stage layout, seating configuration and acoustic requirements. By mid 2024, most civil and structural work had been completed, followed by finishing touches such as foyer design, equipment installation and landscaping.

In 2025, the building had entered its final phase of completion, with authorities confirming that the project was nearly ready for use and awaiting a formal inauguration date for its opening.

== Architecture and facilities ==
Rabindra Bhavan was constructed at an estimated cost of ₹244 crore. The complex consists of three above ground floors and two basement levels used for parking and essential services. Its main venue is a 1,500 seat auditorium, designed with state of the art acoustic and lighting systems to support cultural and public events. The building also contains several multipurpose halls intended for meetings, exhibitions and smaller performances.

Facilities within the complex include an art gallery, library, conference and exhibition areas, VIP rooms and dedicated rehearsal and performance spaces. The basement levels accommodate parking for cars and two-wheelers and house core utilities such as a sewage treatment plant, water treatment plant, rainwater harvesting system and fire safety infrastructure.

The interior also incorporates wall paintings created by artists from Hazaribag, which reflect traditional visual styles from Jharkhand’s indigenous communities.

== See also ==
- Government of Jharkhand
- Department of Urban Development and Housing, Jharkhand
- Department of Tourism, Arts, Culture, Sports and Youth Affairs (Jharkhand)
