= Tellakula Jalayya =

Indian politician

Tellakula Jalayya was a Member of Andhra Pradesh Legislative Assembly from 1955 to 1962 from Guntur I Constituency, and he served as the first Chairman of Guntur Municipal Corporation. Tellakula Jalayya and Nadimpalli Narasimha Rao during their respective terms of office as Municipal Corporation Chairman made the construction of the Jinnah Tower — as a symbol of peace and harmony which still was a landmark of Guntur City. He established Tellakula Jalayya and Polisetty Somasundaram college in 1971 with the sons of Polisetty Somasundaram.
