= Sircilla Municipal Council =

Local civic body in Sircilla, Telangana, India

Sircilla Municipal Council సిరిసిల్ల మున్సిపల్ కౌన్సిల్

Type
- Type: Municipal council

History
- Founded: 1987; 39 years ago

Leadership
- Commissioner: Mohammed Hayaz since 27 January 2020
- Chairperson: Jindam Kala Chaprakani, BRS since 27 January 2020
- Vice chairperson: Manche Srinivas, BRS since 27 January 2020

Structure
- Political groups: Government (33): BRS (33); Official opposition (3): BJP (3); Other opposition (3): INC (2); IND (1)

Elections
- Last election: 2020
- Next election: 2025

Website
- sircillamunicipality.telangana.gov.in

The Sircilla Municipality, classified as a first grade municipality with 39 election wards, was created on 25 August 1987. It is the urban local body of the town of Sircilla. The jurisdiction of the civic body is spread over an area of 55.47km^{2} (21.41 mi^{2}).

== Demographics ==
The Sircilla Municipality had a population of 92,001 as of the 2011 census, and is estimated to have a population of 110,000 as of 2023. As of the 2011 census, there were 6,346 (6.9%) scheduled castes and 1,104 (1.2%) scheduled tribes.

The municipality has 74,790 voters, of which 38,076 are female and 36,712 are male.

== Members ==
No.	Constituency	Name	Party	Remarks
1	Ward No. 1 (UR-W)	Pochaveni Satya	Bharat Rashtra Samithi	
2	Ward No. 2	Rapelli Dhigambar	Bharat Rashtra Samithi	
3	Ward No. 3	Jindam Kala Chaprakani	Bharat Rashtra Samithi	Municipal chairperson
4	Ward No. 4	Veldandi Devadas	Independent	Joined BRS after the 2020 elections
4	Ward No. 4	Veldandi Devadas	Bharat Rashtra Samithi	Joined BRS after the 2020 elections
5	Ward No. 5	Darnam Aruna	Bharat Rashtra Samithi	
6	Ward No. 6 (BC-G)	Gundlapelli Ramanujam	Independent	Joined BRS after the 2020 elections
6	Ward No. 6 (BC-G)	Gundlapelli Ramanujam	Bharat Rashtra Samithi	Joined BRS after the 2020 elections
7	Ward No. 7 (ST-G)	Bukya Reddy Nayak	Bharat Rashtra Samithi	
8	Ward No. 8 (UR-W)	Yerrevelli Vasundara	Bharatiya Janata Party	
9	Ward No. 9 (SC-G)	Lingampally Satyanarayana	Bharat Rashtra Samithi	
10	Ward No. 10	Bollam Nagaraju	Bharatiya Janata Party	
11	Ward No. 11 (UR-W)	Oggu Uma	Bharat Rashtra Samithi	
12	Ward No. 12	Pothuri Rajireddy	Bharat Rashtra Samithi	
13	Ward No. 13 (UR-W)	Jagiru Shailu	Independent	Joined BRS after the 2020 elections
13	Ward No. 13 (UR-W)	Jagiru Shailu	Bharat Rashtra Samithi	Joined BRS after the 2020 elections
14	Ward No. 14 (UR-W)	Addagatla Madahvi	Independent	Joined BRS after the 2020 elections
14	Ward No. 14 (UR-W)	Addagatla Madahvi	Bharat Rashtra Samithi	Joined BRS after the 2020 elections
15	Ward No. 15 (SC-W)	Akunoori Vijayanirmala	Indian National Congress	
16	Ward No. 16	Gudla Srinivas	Independent	Joined BRS after the 2020 elections
16	Ward No. 16	Gudla Srinivas	Bharat Rashtra Samithi	Joined BRS after the 2020 elections
17	Ward No. 17 (UR-W)	Gundlapelli Neeraja	Bharat Rashtra Samithi	
18	Ward No. 18 (BC-W)	Gaddam Chandana	Bharat Rashtra Samithi	
19	Ward No. 19	Annaram Srinivas (BC-G)	Bharat Rashtra Samithi	
20	Ward No. 20 (UR-W)	Adepu Sowjanya	Bharat Rashtra Samithi	
21	Ward No. 21 (BC-G)	Vemula Ravi	Independent	Joined BRS after the 2020 elections
21	Ward No. 21 (BC-G)	Vemula Ravi	Bharat Rashtra Samithi	Joined BRS after the 2020 elections
22	Ward No. 22 (UR-W)	Kalluri Latha	Independent	Joined BRS after the 2020 elections
22	Ward No. 22 (UR-W)	Kalluri Latha	Bharat Rashtra Samithi	Joined BRS after the 2020 elections
23	Ward No. 23 (BC-W)	Rapelli Aruna	Bharat Rashtra Samithi	
24	Ward No. 24 (BC-W)	Komire Mallavva Burra Laxmi	Bharat Rashtra Samithi	
25	Ward No. 25 (BC-G)	Kudikaala Ravikumar	Independent	Joined BRS after the 2020 elections
25	Ward No. 25 (BC-G)	Kudikaala Ravikumar	Bharat Rashtra Samithi	Joined BRS after the 2020 elections
26	Ward No. 26 (SC-G)	Votarikari Laxmirajam	Independent	Joined BRS after the 2020 elections
26	Ward No. 26 (SC-G)	Votarikari Laxmirajam	Bharat Rashtra Samithi	Joined BRS after the 2020 elections
27	Ward No. 27 (UR-W)	Choppadandi Lalitha	Indian National Congress	
28	Ward No. 28	Pathipaka Padma	Bharat Rashtra Samithi	
29	Ward No. 29 (BC-G)	Srinivas Gentyala	Independent	Joined BRS after the 2020 elections
29	Ward No. 29 (BC-G)	Srinivas Gentyala	Bharat Rashtra Samithi	Joined BRS after the 2020 elections
30	Ward No. 30 (BC-G)	Manche Srinivas	Bharat Rashtra Samithi	Municipal vice chairperson
31	Ward No. 31 (BC-G)	Thumma Radha	Independent	Joined BRS after the 2020 elections
31	Ward No. 31 (BC-G)	Thumma Radha	Bharat Rashtra Samithi	Joined BRS after the 2020 elections
32	Ward No. 32 (BC-W)	Seema Begum	Bharat Rashtra Samithi	
33	Ward No. 33 (BC-W)	Gaddam Latha	Bharat Rashtra Samithi	
34	Ward No. 34 (BC-W)	Darla Keerthana	Bharat Rashtra Samithi	
35	Ward No. 35 (BC-G)	Dusa Vinay	Independent	Joined BRS after the 2020 elections
35	Ward No. 35 (BC-G)	Dusa Vinay	Bharat Rashtra Samithi	Joined BRS after the 2020 elections
36	Ward No. 36 (BC-G)	Kalluri Raju	Bharat Rashtra Samithi	
37	Ward No. 37 (BC-W)	Diddi Madhavi	Bharat Rashtra Samithi	
38	Ward No. 38	Guduri Bhaskar	Bharatiya Janata Party	
39	Ward No. 39	Akula Krishna	Bharat Rashtra Samithi	
