= 2026 Guntur Municipal Corporation election =

Municipal corporation election in Guntur, India

- 1 November 2026

All 76 elected seats in the Guntur Municipal Corporation 39 seats needed for a majority
- Turnout: 56.15% (▼4.65)
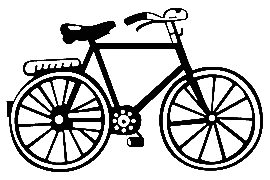

	First party	Second party	Third party
Party	TDP	JSP	YSRCP
Seats won	48	13	11
Seat change	▲39	▲11	▼33
	Fourth party
Party	BJP
Seats won	3
Seat change	▲3
Mayor before election
Kovelamudi Ravindra (Note: Kavati Siva Naga Manohar Naidu was elected Mayor on 18 March 2021 and resigned on 15 March 2025. Kovelamudi Ravindra was subsequently elected Mayor on 28 April 2025.)
TDP
Elected Mayor
Kovelamudi Lakshmi Aparna
TDP

The 2026 Guntur Municipal Corporation election was conducted on 1 November 2026 to elect the Mayor and corporators across all 76 wards of the Guntur Municipal Corporation, the civic body governing the city of Guntur in Andhra Pradesh. The corporation had 57 wards during the 2021 municipal election. In September 2026, a ward delimitation notification increased the number of wards to 76.

The previous municipal corporation election was held in March 2021. The YSR Congress Party won 44 seats, the Telugu Desam Party won nine seats, the Janasena Party won two seats and independent candidates won two seats. Kavati Siva Naga Manohar Naidu of the YSR Congress Party was elected mayor on 18 March 2021. He resigned from the post on 15 March 2025. Subsequently, Kovelamudi Ravindra of the Telugu Desam Party was elected as the Mayor on 28 April 2025, defeating the YSR Congress Party candidate Achchala Venkata Reddy.

== Election schedule ==
On 14 October 2026, Andhra Pradesh State Election Commissioner Anil Chandra Punetha announced the schedule for the local body elections at a press conference in Vijayawada, bringing the Model Code of Conduct into immediate effect.

Date	Event / Details
16.10.2026 (Friday)	Issue of Public Notice by the Returning Officer under Section 35 of the Municipal Corporations Act, 1955
16.10.2026 (Friday)	Date of Election Notification
18.10.2026 (Sunday)	Last date for filing nominations (Up to 3:00 PM)
19.10.2026 (Monday)	Scrutiny of nominations (From 11:00 AM onwards)
21.10.2026 (Wednesday)	Last date for withdrawal of candidatures (Up to 3:00 PM)
21.10.2026 (Wednesday)	Publication of the list of contesting candidates (After 3:00 PM)
25.10.2026 (Sunday)	Publication of the list of contesting candidates (After 3:00 PM)
01.11.2026 (Sunday)	Date of polling, if necessary (7:00 AM to 5:00 PM)
02.11.2026 (Monday)	Date of re-polling, if any (7:00 AM to 5:00 PM)
03.11.2026 (Tuesday)	Counting of votes (From 8:00 AM onwards)

== Reservation ==
The office of Mayor of Guntur Municipal Corporation is reserved for Women (General). Out of the 76 wards in the Municipal Corporation, 2 wards are reserved for Scheduled Tribes (STs), 9 for Scheduled Castes (SCs), 27 for Backward Classes (BCs) and 20 for Women (General), while the remaining 18 wards are unreserved.

Reservation of Wards in Guntur Municipal Corporation
Category	Number of Seats	Reserved Ward Numbers
Scheduled Tribes (ST)	2	Women: 21; General: 59
Scheduled Castes (SC)	9	Women: 8, 67, 70, 76; General: 36, 61, 63, 71, 72
Backward Classes (BC)	27	Women: 2, 3, 14, 16, 25, 26, 28, 29, 32, 33, 35, 52, 74; General: 7, 11, 12, 13, 15, 17, 20, 22, 23, 34, 37, 38, 66, 68
Women (General)	20	1, 4, 5, 9, 18, 19, 30, 31, 41, 43, 46, 47, 49, 53, 55, 58, 60, 65, 69, 73, 75
Unreserved	18	1, 6, 10, 24, 27, 39, 40, 42, 44, 45, 48, 50, 51, 54, 56, 57, 62, 64
Total	76	—

== Party-wise results ==
S.No.	Party name	Symbol	Won
1	Telugu Desam Party		48
2	Janasena Party		13
3	YSR Congress Party		11
4	Bharatiya Janata Party		3
5	Independents		1

== Mayoral election ==
The office of Mayor of Guntur Municipal Corporation was reserved for Women (General). A total of 14 candidates contested the election, which was held on 1 November 2026. The election marked the return of direct mayoral elections in Guntur after a gap of 21 years. Kovelamudi Lakshmi Aparna of the Telugu Desam Party was elected Mayor with a margin of 96,294 votes.

2026 Andhra Pradesh urban local bodies elections: Guntur Municipal Corporation Mayor
Party	Candidate	Votes	%	±%
TDP	Kovelamudi Lakshmi Aparna	208,925	61.77	
YSRCP	Tadikonda Alivelu Venkata Naga Padma Sridevi	1,12,631	33.30	
INC	Chopparapu Padmavathi	4,805	1.42	
NOTA	None of the above	2,793	0.83	
Total valid votes		3,38,239	97.53	
Rejected ballots		8,555	2.47	
Majority		96,294	28.47	
Turnout		3,46,794	56.05	
Registered electors		6,18,714		
TDP hold		Swing		

== Results by ward ==
The results were announced on 3 November 2026. The Telugu Desam Party won 48 wards, while the Janasena Party, YSR Congress Party and Bharatiya Janata Party won 13, 11 and 3 wards respectively. One ward was won by an independent candidate. The winners are as follows.

Results
Ward		Winner			Runner Up			Margin
#	Name	Candidate	Party	Votes	Candidate	Party	Votes	Margin
1	Ward 1	Kota Pitchi Reddy	TDP	2913	Chadalavada Venu Babu	YSRCP	2432	481
2	Ward 2	Madanu Usha Rani	YSRCP	1664	Bella Venkata Ramana	Independent	1474	190
3	Ward 3	Shaik Shabana	TDP	2820	Shaik Hassena	YSRCP	1868	952
4	Ward 4	Aila Anitha	TDP	2110	Janga Sireesha	YSRCP	1840	270
5	Ward 5	Yadla Lakshmi	JSP	3176	Polavarapu Jyothi	YSRCP	979	2197
6	Ward 6	Irri Sai	JSP	2510	Pulla Kishore Babu	YSRCP	1723	787
7	Ward 7	Farooq Mohammed	YSRCP	2281	Abdul Salam Bashi	TDP	1820	461
8	Ward 8	Doppala Vinoda Rani	YSRCP	2667	Chilaka Jhansi Rani	TDP	1914	753
9	Ward 9	Pothuraj Samatha	TDP	1817	Nama Nagalakshmi	Independent	1233	584
10	Ward 10	Sanakkayala Umasankar	BJP	1304	Anandsagar Chamarthi	JSP	1178	126
11	Ward 11	Mohammed Abul Faiz	TDP	2767	Liaquat Ali Shaik	YSRCP	2009	758
12	Ward 12	Shaik F. U. Khaja Mohiuddin (Firoz)	YSRCP	1775	Mohammad Mavaiz	TDP	1687	88
13	Ward 13	Gali Satish Babu	TDP	1626	Kurakula Peda Srinivasa Rao	JSP	1574	52
14	Ward 14	Yallavula Sowjanya	TDP	3481	Elika Venkata Subhasini	YSRCP	796	2685
15	Ward 15	Shaik Samiulla Baig	YSRCP	2813	Shaik Mohammed Mazharuddin	TDP	2172	641
16	Ward 16	Mohammed Noorjahan	YSRCP	2421	Sayyad Asia Shaheda	TDP	1635	786
17	Ward 17	Shaik Naimuddin	TDP	2960	Ajay Ramanaboina	YSRCP	2669	291
18	Ward 18	Dadi Jyothi	JSP	2303	Vijaya Durga Daram	YSRCP	885	1418
19	Ward 19	Dasari Lakshmi Durga	JSP	2271	Kona Mahalakshmi	Independent	1919	352
20	Ward 20	Saraswathi Venkata Srinvasa Raju	TDP	3380	Panyam Murali Krishna	YSRCP	2323	1057
21	Ward 21	Palaparthi Sai Vanaja	TDP	2978	Kondareddy Padmavathi	YSRCP	2373	605
22	Ward 22	Shaik Ameena	YSRCP	2218	Sankuri Srinivasa Rao	JSP	1866	352
23	Ward 23	Battula Prasad	TDP	2681	Pallapu Mahesh Babu	YSRCP	1334	1347
24	Ward 24	Nimmala Venkata Ramana	JSP	2269	Kavati Udaya Chandra Vikarma Naidu	BJP	1274	995
25	Ward 25	Kunchapu Tripura Vasavi	TDP	3594	Vallepu Prasanna Lakshmi	YSRCP	872	2722
26	Ward 26	Shaik Shajahan	TDP	2993	Shaik Ramija	YSRCP	2275	718
27	Ward 27	Vulli Gopala Krishna	TDP	3242	Dasari Vara Prasada Rao	YSRCP	1011	2231
28	Ward 28	Dontha Hymavathi	JSP	3296	Rajavarapu Aswini	YSRCP	1290	2006
29	Ward 29	Shaik Sharmila	TDP	2222	Gedela Naga Rangamani	YSRCP	2034	188
30	Ward 30	Alla Sireesha	JSP	3181	Vadranam Megha Manjusha	YSRCP	1377	1804
31	Ward 31	Ganta Venkata Moulika	TDP	2527	Gaddam Durga Krishnaveni	YSRCP	1118	1409
32	Ward 32	Thummala Nagamalleswari	TDP	2335	Shaik Rahima	YSRCP	2267	68
33	Ward 33	Bonaboina Sujatha	JSP	3031	Gogula Gowtami	YSRCP	1840	1191
34	Ward 34	Galam Venkateswarlu	TDP	2768	Jaripiti Susheela	YSRCP	1595	1173
35	Ward 35	Tadisetty Amala	TDP	4280	Chintalapudi Lakshmi	Independent	742	3538
36	Ward 36	Dasari Nagaraju	YSRCP	3497	Dasri Anil Kumar	TDP	2464	1033
37	Ward 37	Shaik Lal Ahmad	JSP	1853	Koteswara Rao Challa	YSRCP	1751	102
38	Ward 38	Roshan Shaik	YSRCP	3594	Sanjeeva Rao Parchuri	TDP	2311	1283
39	Ward 39	Gaddam Ravi Kumar	YSRCP	1672	Pasupuleti Narasimha Rao	JSP	1467	205
40	Ward 40	Chennam Venkata Seetaramaiah	TDP	1930	Yarram Krishna Reddy	YSRCP	1250	680
41	Ward 41	Turaga Gayathri (Behara)	BJP	1894	Eachampati Sujatha	YSRCP	1294	600
42	Ward 42	Tadisetti Venkata Uttej	TDP	2483	Ala Siva Ramakrishna	YSRCP	797	1686
43	Ward 43	Gayathri Rangavajula	BJP	2151	Busi Rajalatha	YSRCP	1073	1078
44	Ward 44	Gurram Prasad	TDP	2413	Gurisetty Ravi Babu	YSRCP	982	1431
45	Ward 45	Muthineni Rajesh	TDP	3058	Thummuru Lakshmi Narayana Reddy	YSRCP	479	2579
46	Ward 46	Jampani Naga Malleswari	TDP	1959	Gopi Salamma	YSRCP	1433	526
47	Ward 47	Patan Shama	TDP	1994	Patan Jameera Baegum	YSRCP	1312	682
48	Ward 48	Manam Srinivas	TDP	2726	Pasupuleti Venkata Ramana	YSRCP	539	2187
49	Ward 49	Baliji Suguna Devi	TDP	2065	Jyothi Kotha	YSRCP	1454	611
50	Ward 50	Nulupuri Srinivasarao	TDP	3726	Chilakala Venkateswara Reddy	YSRCP	1961	1765
51	Ward 51	Nagineni Muralikrishna	JSP	2961	Nune Dasaratha Rami Reddy	YSRCP	2261	700
52	Ward 52	Panchumarthi Nagamani	TDP	3420	Toka Koteswaramma	YSRCP	1399	2021
53	Ward 53	Gurrala Madhubindu	Independent	2245	Singamsetty Varalakshmi	TDP	2188	57
54	Ward 54	Pakalapati Srikanth	TDP	3517	Challa Seshi Reddy	YSRCP	635	2882
55	Ward 55	Gunda Bhavani	TDP	2219	Sidde Venkayamma	YSRCP	504	1715
56	Ward 56	Vemulapalli Sree Rama Prasad	TDP	2896	Chunduru Vijaya Bhaskar	YSRCP	374	2522
57	Ward 57	Kommineni Koteswara Rao	TDP	2258	Vadde Karunakar Reddy	YSRCP	950	1308
58	Ward 58	Maram Reddy Koteswari	YSRCP	1996	Mattipudi Siva Lakshmi	JSP	1843	153
59	Ward 59	Peram Srinivasa Rao	TDP	1996	Dhanavath Venkateswarlu Naik	YSRCP	1563	433
60	Ward 60	Yeluka Dhanalakshmi	TDP	2515	Mallisetty Deenama	YSRCP	1562	953
61	Ward 61	Bezzam Anil	TDP	2355	Kishore Kumar Bodapati	YSRCP	1359	996
62	Ward 62	Balaji Nukavarapu	TDP	3884	Arika Srinivasa Reddy	YSRCP	1566	2318
63	Ward 63	Betham Sowry	TDP	2664	Dara Hema Prasad	YSRCP	2238	426
64	Ward 64	Yarramsetty Rajesh	JSP	3492	Jallepalli Venu Babu	YSRCP	1826	1666
65	Ward 65	Yarramsetti Sandhya	TDP	1598	Gantasala Nagalakshmi	Independent	1380	218
66	Ward 66	Talla Sambasiva Rao (Bujji)	TDP	2967	Golla Siva Sankar Yadav	YSRCP	2717	250
67	Ward 67	Konduru Samata	JSP	2340	Cheedarla Jyothi	YSRCP	1807	533
68	Ward 68	Vangara Edukondalu	TDP	2680	Tummeti Krishna	YSRCP	1477	1203
69	Ward 69	Bharathi Muppavarapu	TDP	3370	Vanukuri Nagalakshmi	YSRCP	874	2496
70	Ward 70	Alladi Jessi Krupa Sowjanya	TDP	2700	Varikuti Sobha Rani	YSRCP	1789	911
71	Ward 71	Gudimetla Dayaratnam	TDP	2744	Dupati Ramesh	YSRCP	1897	847
72	Ward 72	Yerraguntla Anada Rao	TDP	2333	Parisapogu Bharat Kumar	YSRCP	1240	1093
73	Ward 73	Ayeesetty Kanakadurga	JSP	2723	Kota Dhanalakshmi	YSRCP	1402	1321
74	Ward 74	Gudipalli Swathi Krishna	TDP	2330	Suragani Nirmala	YSRCP	1356	974
75	Ward 75	Chereddy Naga Kranthi	TDP	2253	Deepthi Priyanka Dammalapti	YSRCP	1619	634
76	Ward 76	Ankam Malini	TDP	3115	Meriga Elizabeth Rani	YSRCP	2095	1020

== Alliance partner contests ==
The six wards in which alliance partners contested against each other produced mixed results. The BJP won Ward 10, while the TDP won Wards 13, 49 and 63. The YSR Congress Party benefited and won Wards 22 and 39, where the Janasena Party and BJP contested against each other, due to a split in the alliance vote.

Wards with contests between alliance partners
Party combination	Number of wards	Ward numbers
TDP – JSP	3	13, 49, 63
JSP – BJP	3	10, 22, 39
Total	6	—

== See also ==
- Guntur Municipal Corporation
- 2021 Guntur Municipal Corporation election
- Elections in Andhra Pradesh
