= Hazaribagh Municipal Corporation =

Local civic body in Hazaribagh, Jharkhand, India

Hazaribagh Municipal Corporation हजारीबाग नगर निगम

Type
- Type: Municipal Corporation

History
- Founded: 1886; 140 years ago

Leadership
- Mayor: Arvind Kumar Rana, Independent since 2026
- Deputy Mayor: Vacant since 2023
- Municipal Commissioner: Shri Om Prakash Gupta
- Seats: 36

Elections
- Last election: 2026
- Next election: 2031

Website
- Official website

Hazaribagh Municipal Corporation (HMC) is the urban local body that governs the city of Hazaribagh in the Indian state of Jharkhand. It was originally constituted as a municipality in 1886 and was later elevated to the status of a municipal corporation. The corporation comprises 36 wards, each represented by an elected councillor.

== History ==
Hazaribagh Municipal Corporation traces its origins to 1886, when Hazaribagh was first constituted as a municipality during British rule. The municipality was responsible for basic civic administration, including sanitation, water supply, and local infrastructure.

With the growth of the city and increasing urban population, the municipality was later upgraded to a municipal corporation to provide a more comprehensive framework for governance and urban development. Since its elevation, the corporation has expanded its functions to include planning and maintenance of roads, street lighting, solid waste management, water distribution, and other civic amenities.

== Administrative setup ==
The provision of Jharkhand Municipal Act 2011 defines the power of Hazaribagh Municipal Corporation. The corporation consists of 36 municipal wards, each represented by an elected councillor. The elected body is headed by a Mayor and a Deputy Mayor. In addition, the Municipal Commissioner, appointed by the state government, oversees the administrative functions of the corporation.

Since September 2024, Yogendra Prasad is the current Municipal Commissioner of Hazaribagh Municipal Corporation.

The administrative role of the Hazaribagh Municipal Corporation includes:

- Implementation of decisions taken by the elected council.
- Management of urban services and infrastructure within city limits.
- Supervising day to day municipal governance through officials and staff.

== Functions ==
Hazaribagh Municipal Corporation is created for the following functions:

- Solid waste management.
- Street light management.
- Approval of construction of new building and regulation of land use.
- Issuance of birth and death certificate.
- Construction and maintenance of municipal roads, drains and public infrastructure.
- Slum Management & encroachment removal.
- Development & maintenance of burial grounds and crematoriums.
- Regulation of slaughter houses.
- Prevention of food adulteration.
- Preventive health care.
- Management of storm water and waste water drainage.

== Revenue ==
The following are the Income sources for the Corporation from the Central and State Government.

=== Revenue from taxes ===
Following is the Tax related revenue for the corporation:

- Property tax
- Profession tax
- Entertainment tax
- Grants from Central and State Government like Goods and Services Tax
- Advertisement tax

=== Revenue from non-tax sources ===
Following is the Non Tax related revenue for the corporation:

- Water usage charges
- Fees from Documentation services
- Rent received from municipal property
- Funds from municipal bonds
