= Duggirala Gopalakrishnayya =

Indian politician and freedom fighter

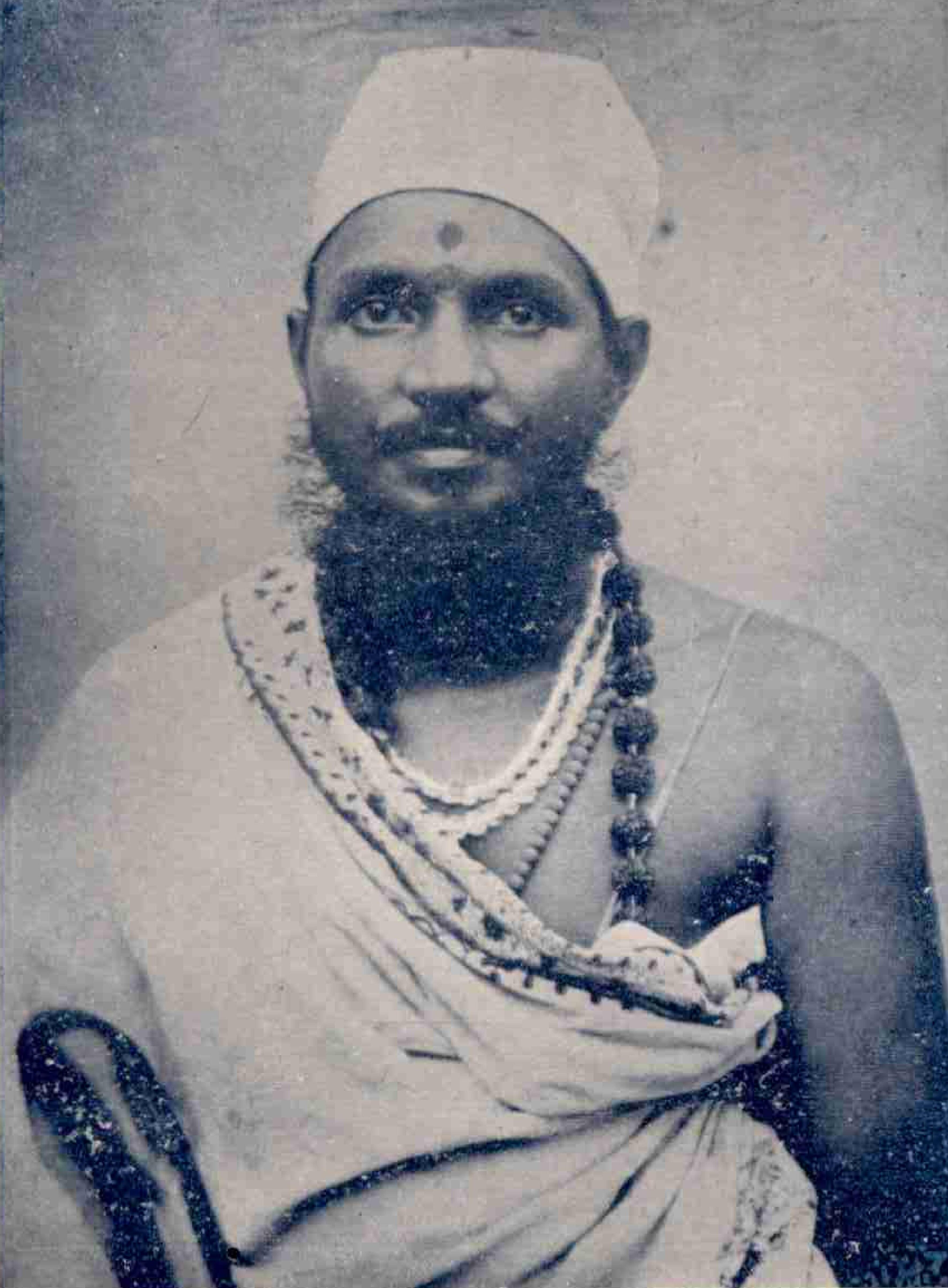
- Duggirala Gopalakrishnayya
- Born: 2 June 1889; Penuganchiprolu in Krishna District of present day Andhra Pradesh
- Died: 10 June 1928 (aged 39); Guntur, Andhra Pradesh
- Other name: Andhra Ratna
- Education: The University of Edinburgh (M.A.)
- Organization(s): Rama Dandu, Indian National Congress
- Movement: Indian independence movement

Duggirala Gopalakrishnayya (Telugu: దుగ్గిరాల గోపాలకృష్ణయ్య), (2 June 1889 – 10 June 1928) was an Indian freedom fighter and member of the Indian National Congress from the southern Indian state of Andhra Pradesh. Known by his title of Andhra Ratna (Telugu: ఆంధ్ర రత్న, translates to "Jewel of Andhra" or "Gem of Andhra." Sri Duggirala Gopalakrishnayya, Gopalakrishnayya was the first Andhra leader to become secretary of the All India Congress Committee. Sri Duggirala Gopalakrishnayya, was a very captivating poet, speaker, songwriter, philosopher, singer and an extraordinary revolutionary with a philosophy of non-violence. Sri Nadimpalli Venkata Lakshmi Narasimha Rao worked in tandem with Sri Duggirala Gopalakrishnayya. For his exemplary work and sacrifices for freedom movement in Andhra, he was fondly conferred the name 'Andhra Ratna' (Jewel of state Andhra Pradesh state)

== Early life and education ==
Gopalakrishnayya was born in Penuganchiprolu in the Nandigama taluk of Krishna District in 1889 in a Brahmin family. His father, Kodandaramaswamy, was a school teacher but came from a family of landlords from Guntur and his mother Sitamma died soon after giving birth to him, her only child. Gopalkrishnayya's father remarried but died when he was still young and he was raised by his uncle and grandmother. He did his schooling from the Bapatla Municipal High School and worked for a year at the Bapatla taluk office after completing his matriculation. In 1911 he chose go to the University of Edinburgh along with his childhood friend Sri Nadimpalli Narasimha Rao (Barrister of Guntur) where he lived for six years and earned a postgraduate degree in economics.

When he returned to Guntur in 1917, he served for some time in the Government College at Rajahmundry and the National College at Machilipatnam, AP. He was, however, not satisfied with the kind of education that was imparted there. Moreover, after attending the Calcutta Congress session in 1920, he was attracted to principles of 'non-co-operation' and 'Satyagraha', and resolved to dedicate his life to the achievement of Swaraj (native rule).

== Freedom fighter ==
While in Guntur he became involved in Annie Besant's Home Rule Movement. In 1919 he gave up his teaching career to become a full-time political activist. He attended the Calcutta session of the Indian National Congress in 1920 where he was attracted to the idea of non-cooperation that the Congress endorsed.

=== Rama Dandu ===
Gopalakrishnayya was a devotee of the Hindu deity Rama and he organised a cadre of workers whom he called Rama Dandu (meaning Rama's Army) to work for the cause of swaraj. In 1921 the Congress held its annual session at Bezwada (or Vijayawada) where the Rama Dandu played a prominent role in organising it. Members of the Dandu wore saffron clothes and donned rudraksha beads and vermilion and they participated in the meeting in large numbers. Mohammed Ali, the president of the session, was impressed enough to call it the Red Army of India.

=== Chirala anti-tax agitation ===
Gopalakrishnayya is perhaps best known for the anti-tax satyagraha he led in Chirala during the Non-Cooperation Movement. The satyagraha had its roots in the decision of the colonial government of the Madras Presidency to combine the villages of Chirala and Perala in Guntur district into a municipality. While the villages yielded an annual tax of revenue of ₹4000 per annum, their reclassification as a municipal area would yield the government a revenue of ₹40,000 per annum. The move was opposed by the residents as it would impose a greater tax burden on them. The government however chose to press ahead with its decision prompting the municipal council to resign en masse. In January 1921 the residents decided not to pay the taxes and the government in response clamped down by arresting, prosecuting and sentencing several of the protesters to imprisonment.

Following the Bezwada Congress session, Mahatma Gandhi visited Chirala where Gopalakrishnayya sought his advice on the future course of action. Gandhi advised the continuation of a nonviolent struggle and the mass movement of people residing in the municipal area to regions beyond town limits as this would also render a depopulated municipality meaningless. Heeding Gandhi's advice, Gopalakrishnayya, in April 1921, led the residents of Chirala town to move out of the town and set up temporary settlements beyond town limits. Nearly 13,000 out of the town's total population of 15,000 responded to his call and shifted to a new settlement called Ramanagar where he set up an assembly comprising members from all castes and a court of arbitration. Gopalakrishnayya and the Rama Dandu worked to keep up the morale of the people and this establishment continued for a period of eleven months. Ultimately a combination of dwindling finances, the arrest and imprisonment of Gopalakrishnayya at Trichnopoly and the absence of leaders to continue the struggle in the absence of Gopalakrishnayya led to the winding up of Ramanagara.

=== Swarajya Party ===
Following the withdrawal of the Non Cooperation Movement, dissension spread across the Congress party on the issue of its future course of action. When C R Das and Motilal Nehru founded the Swarajya Party in 1925, Gopalakrishnayya joined it and became one of its secretaries from Andhra. For his work with Rama Dandu and the establishment of Ramanagar, he came to be known as Ramadas and as a leader of the Swarajya Party he would sometimes introduce himself with a tinge of humour as C R Das or Chirala Rama Das.

== Literature ==
Gopalakrishnayya was a polyglot fluent in Sanskrit, Telugu, Hindi and English and an extempore composer of verse. He was a powerful orator and set up the Andhra Vidya Peetha Gosthi, a literary society but gave primacy to his political career over his literary talents. During his years in England, Gopalakrishnayya became friends with Ananda Coomaraswamy with whom he translated the Abhinayadarpana of Nandikesvara into English as The Mirror of Gesture. He was a mentor to the Telugu writer Abburi Ramakrishna Rau and had a strong influence on the poet B Sundararama Sastri.

== Family ==
Gopalakrishnayya married Durga Bhavani Amma as a 14-year-old in 1903.

== Death and commemoration ==
Gopalakrishnayya was diagnosed with advanced tuberculosis in 1926 and spent much of his last days in poverty and suffering. He died on 10 June 1928, aged 39. He is known by the title Andhra Ratna (or Jewel of Andhra).

The Congress Party's headquarters in Vijayawada, the Andhra Ratna Bhavan, is named after Gopalakrishnayya. There are biographies of his by Chalapathi Rao and K Kutumbasastri. A bronze statue of his, unveiled by K Kamaraj, stands in Chirala.
