= Adityapur Municipal Corporation =

Local civic body in Adityapur, Jharkhand, India

Adityapur Municipal Corporation आदित्यपुर नगर निगम
- Seal of the Adityapur Municipal Corporation

Type
- Type: Municipal Corporation

History
- Founded: 1963; 63 years ago

Leadership
- Mayor: Sanjay Sardar, BJP since 2026
- Deputy Mayor: Ankur Singh, JMM Congress RJD Suporter since 2026
- Municipal Commissioner: Parul Singh
- Seats: 35

Elections
- Last election: 2026
- Next election: 2031

Website
- Official website

Adityapur Municipal Corporation (AMC) is the urban local body responsible for the civic administration of the city of Adityapur in the Seraikela Kharsawan district of the Indian state of Jharkhand. It was established in 1963 as a municipal council and was upgraded to municipal corporation status in June 2015. The corporation governs an area of approximately 49 square kilometres and has 35 administrative wards.

== History ==
Adityapur was established as a municipal council in 1963 to administer the developing urban area adjoining Jamshedpur. Over the years, the town expanded due to industrial and residential growth. In June 2015, the Government of Jharkhand upgraded the municipal council to a municipal corporation, expanding its administrative structure and jurisdiction. At present there are 35 wards.

== Administrative setup ==
The provision of Jharkhand Municipal Act 2011 defines the power of Adityapur Municipal Corporation. The corporation consists of 35 municipal wards, each represented by an elected councillor. The elected body is headed by a Mayor and a Deputy Mayor. In addition, the Municipal Commissioner, appointed by the state government, oversees the administrative functions of the corporation.

The administrative role of the Adityapur Municipal Corporation includes:

- Implementation of decisions taken by the elected council.
- Management of urban services and infrastructure within city limits.
- Supervising day to day municipal governance through officials and staff.

== Functions ==
Adityapur Municipal Corporation is created for the following functions:

- Solid waste management.
- Street light management.
- Approval of construction of new building and regulation of land use.
- Issuance of birth and death certificate.
- Construction and maintenance of municipal roads, drains and public infrastructure.
- Slum Management & encroachment removal.
- Development & maintenance of burial grounds and crematoriums.
- Regulation of slaughter houses.
- Prevention of food adulteration.
- Preventive health care.
- Management of storm water and waste water drainage.

== Revenue ==
The following are the Income sources for the Corporation from the Central and State Government.

=== Revenue from taxes ===
Following is the Tax related revenue for the corporation:

- Property tax
- Profession tax
- Entertainment tax
- Grants from Central and State Government like Goods and Services Tax
- Advertisement tax

=== Revenue from non-tax sources ===
Following is the Non Tax related revenue for the corporation:

- Water usage charges
- Fees from Documentation services
- Rent received from municipal property
- Funds from municipal bonds
