= Chas Municipal Corporation =

Local civic body in Bokaro, Jharkhand, India

Chas Municipal Corporation चास नगर निगम
- Seal of the Chas Municipal Corporation

Type
- Type: Municipal Corporation

History
- Founded: 1977; 49 years ago

Leadership
- Mayor: Bholu Paswan
- Deputy Mayor: Puja Kumari
- Municipal Commissioner: Sanjeev Kumar, JAS
- Seats: 35

Elections
- Last election: 2015
- Next election: 2026

Meeting place
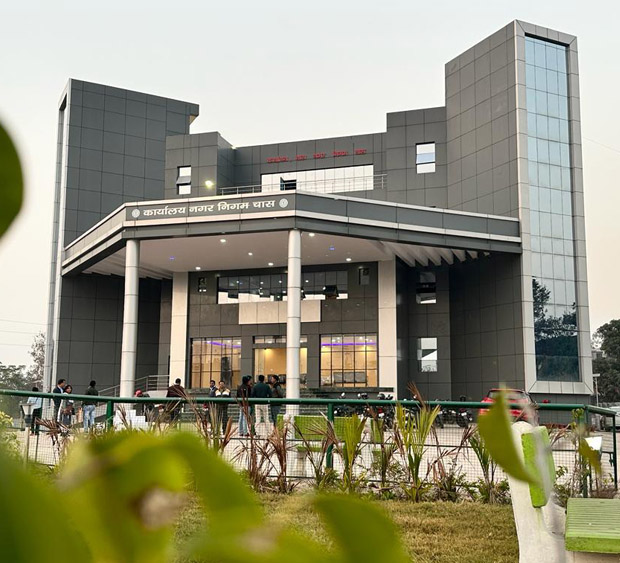
- ITI More, Chas, Bokaro, Jharkhand - 827013

Website
- Official website

Chas Municipal Corporation (CMC) is the urban local body governing Chas and Bokaro Steel City in Bokaro district, Jharkhand, India. It was formed on 9 February 2015 through the upgradation of Chas Municipality, which had been established in 1977. The corporation is responsible for civic administration and urban infrastructure and comprises 35 wards represented by elected councillors.

== History ==
Chas Municipality was established in 1977 to administer the growing urban area adjoining Bokaro Steel City in Bokaro district. The town developed alongside the expansion of industrial and residential activities in the region.

On 9 February 2015, the Government of Jharkhand upgraded Chas Municipality to a municipal corporation. The corporation currently comprises 35 wards and functions as the principal urban local body for the city.

== Administrative setup ==
The provision of Jharkhand Municipal Act 2011 defines the power of Chas Municipal Corporation. The corporation consists of 35 municipal wards, each represented by an elected councillor. The elected body is headed by a Mayor and a Deputy Mayor. In addition, the Municipal Commissioner, appointed by the state government, oversees the administrative functions of the corporation.

Since September 2024, Sanjiv Kumar is the current Municipal Commissioner of Chas Municipal Corporation.

The administrative role of the Chas Municipal Corporation includes:

- Implementation of decisions taken by the elected council.
- Management of urban services and infrastructure within city limits.
- Supervising day to day municipal governance through officials and staff.

== Functions ==
Chas Municipal Corporation is created for the following functions:

- Solid waste management.
- Street light management.
- Approval of construction of new building and regulation of land use.
- Issuance of birth and death certificate.
- Construction and maintenance of municipal roads, drains and public infrastructure.
- Slum Management & encroachment removal.
- Development & maintenance of burial grounds and crematoriums.
- Regulation of slaughter houses.
- Prevention of food adulteration.
- Preventive health care.
- Management of storm water and waste water drainage.

== Revenue ==
The following are the Income sources for the Corporation from the Central and State Government.

=== Revenue from taxes ===
Following is the Tax related revenue for the corporation:

- Property tax
- Profession tax
- Entertainment tax
- Grants from Central and State Government like Goods and Services Tax
- Advertisement tax

=== Revenue from non-tax sources ===
Following is the Non Tax related revenue for the corporation:

- Water usage charges
- Fees from Documentation services
- Rent received from municipal property
- Funds from municipal bonds
