= Ranchi Municipal Corporation =

Local governing body of Ranchi

Ranchi Municipal Corporation रांची नगर निगम
- Emblem of the Ranchi Municipal Corporation

History
- Founded: 1979; 47 years ago

Leadership
- Mayor: Roshini Khalkho
- Deputy Mayor: Neeraj Kumar
- Municipal Commissioner: Mr. Sushant Gaurav (IAS)
- Seats: 55

Elections
- Last election: 2026
- Next election: 2031

Meeting place
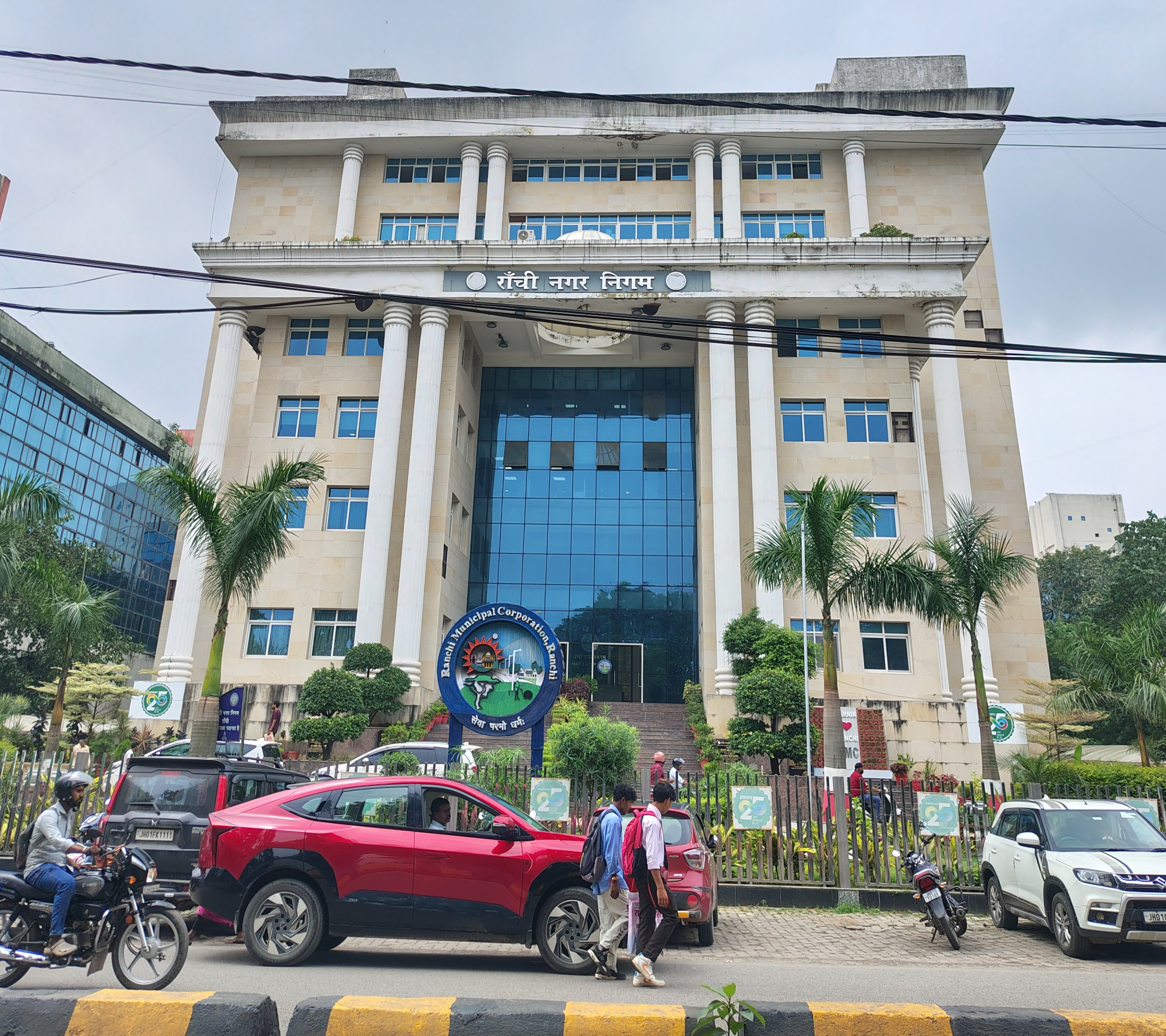
- Kutchery Road, Ranchi, Jharkhand - 834001

Website
- www.ranchimunicipal.com

Ranchi Municipal Corporation is responsible for the civic administration of the city of Ranchi. It was established in 1979 in erstwhile Bihar and is presently the biggest municipality in Jharkhand. According to Census of India 2011, the area under the municipal body is 175.12 sq km and the population is 1,073,427. There are 55 wards in the city, which are further grouped into zones. The last election to the municipal corporation took place in 2026, with candidates backed by Bharatiya Janata Party winning the seats of Mayor and Deputy Mayor.

== Municipal history ==
Ranchi Municipal Corporation was established on 15th September 1979 by merging erstwhile Ranchi Municipality, Doranda Municipality and Ranchi Doranda Joint Water Board. It was the second municipal corporation to be set up in erstwhile Bihar (after Patna Municipal Corporation) and the first in the state of Jharkhand. Ranchi city got its first municipality in 1869, which covered an area of 7.02 sq km. This was extended in 1951 and 1971 to 20.3 sq km and 89.98 sq km respectively. The present Ranchi Municipal Corporation was established in 1979 and the first elections to the corporation were held in 1986. The municipal corporation covers an area of 175.12 sq km and is divided into 55 administrative wards, each represented by an elected councillor.

At the time of the creation of the state of Jharkhand in 2000, the Bihar Municipal Act, 1922 was adapted as the Jharkhand Municipal Act, 2000 to govern all urban local bodies in the new state. Ranchi Municipal Corporation was governed by its own municipal act, the Ranchi Municipal Corporation Act, 2001. With the enactment of the Jharkhand Municipal Act 2011, these two ceased to be in effect and the 2011 became the only governing legislature for all city governments in Jharkhand.

== Administrative set up ==
=== Municipal commissioner ===
The commissioner is appointed by the state government. They are either an officer from the Indian Administrative Service or the Jharkhand Administrative Service. According to Section 55 of the Jharkhand Municipal Act, 2011, the appointment can be made on regular basis or contractual basis and no time period is mentioned for the position. The present municipal commissioner at Ranchi Municipal Corporation is Mr. Sushant Gaurav, a cadre from the Indian Administrative Services.

Some of the powers and functions of the Commissioner are:

- The Standing Committee may delegate some of its power or functions to the commissioner and in turn, the commissioner may delegate their power to any corporation officer or employee (Section 33)
- The Commissioner is supposed to nominate an official to be the secretary of the Ward Committee (Section 34) and Conveyor of Zonal Committees (Section 49)
- The Commissioner can attend any meeting of the corporation or may authorize any corporation officer to attend (Section 82)
- The Commissioner shall prepare a budget estimate every year (Section 108 (1))
- The Commissioner has to approve every public advertisement in the city (Section 171)
- The Commissioner can serve a notice to an occupier of a land or building for the purpose of the recovery of property tax (Section 185 (1))

=== Municipal departments ===
There are 24 administrative departments at Ranchi Municipal Corporation. Some important departments at the Corporation are: Accounts, Birth & Death Registration, Bhoosampada, Engineering, Health, Revenue, Town Planning, and Water supply.

=== Key administrative posts ===
Apart from the municipal commissioner, the Jharkhand Municipal Act, 2011 mentions the following key administrative posts to be created at the municipal corporation:

- Chief Finance Officer / Chief Accounts Officer
- Municipal Internal Auditor
- Chief Municipal Engineer
- Chief Town Planner and Municipal Architect
- Chief Municipal Health Officer
- Chief Environmental Engineer (for solid waste management)
- Chief Information and Technology Officer
- Municipal Law Officer
- Municipal Secretary
- Additional and Deputy/Assistant Municipal Commissioners

== Elected Representatives ==
=== Mayor and Deputy Mayor ===
Under section 26 of the Jharkhand Municipal Act, 2011, the positions of mayor and deputy mayor are elected directly i.e. the position holders are voted in by the people themselves. The last municipal election was in 2026 with a voter turnout of 49.3%. Roshini Khalkho and Sanjeev Vijayvargiya both of the Bharatiya Janta Party won the mayoral and deputy mayoral seats. The 2018 municipal election was the first and only time the mayoral and deputy mayoral candidates in Jharkhand could use political party symbols, while the candidates for councilor seats continued to use symbols allotted to them by the Jharkhand State Election Commission. The next municipal election will take place in 2031.

=== Councillors ===
Each ward of the corporation is represented by an elected councillor whose term is coterminous with that of the corporation i.e. of five years. For the purpose of election, the councillors can not use party symbols and are instead provided with election symbols by the Jharkhand State Election Commission. According to the Jharkhand Municipal Act, 2011, around 50% of the seats are to be reserved for the following categories:

- Scheduled Castes,
- Scheduled Tribes,
- Backward Classes,
- Women

The seats reserved for persons belonging to the Scheduled Castes and Scheduled Tribes categories will be proportionate to their population share in the municipality. The remaining number of seats within the 50% stipulated reserved seats will be reserved for candidates from Other Backward Classes. Further, up to 50% of the reserved seats and up to50% of the unreserved seats will be reserved for women. The seats so reserved will be allotted on a rotational basis i.e. the councillor seat of any particular ward need not be reserved for the same category or be reserved at all in subsequent elections. Presently, there are 55 councillors in Ranchi representing 55 wards.

=== Committees ===
Jharkhand Municipal Act, 2011 mandates the establishment of standing committees at every municipality. The mayor is the presiding officer and the term of the members is of five years. Ranchi Municipal Corporation has set up a Standing Committee. The Standing Committee is composed of ten councillors, the mayor, the deputy mayor, the municipal commissioner and RMC officials. The Act also mandates the setting up of Zonal Committees, each representing groups of wards in the city. These too have been formed in Ranchi, with each Zonal Committee having 5–6 wards under it. The function of the Zonal committees is to look after the issues felt at each zone, report them to the corporation, and prepare solutions for the same. The Jharkhand Municipal Act, 2011 mandates the establishment of ward committees for each ward in the municipality. Though ward committees have been formed in Ranchi, they are not active.

== Wards ==
Zone	Ward Number	Ward Name	Areas Covered	Assembly Constituency	Councillor	Political Group
West	1				Smt Asha Lakra	
West	2				Shri Sanjeev Vijaywargiya	
West	3				Shri Nakul Tirkey	
West	4				Shri Gundra Oraon	
West	5				Smt. Basanti Lakra	
West	6				Smt. Husna Aara	
West	7				Smt. Gayatri Devi	
West	8				Smt. Monika Khalkho	
West	9				Smt. Sujata Kachhap	
West	10				Smt. Vina Agrawal	
West	11				Smt. Preety Ranjan	
West	12				Shri Arjun Kumar Yadav	
North	13				Smt. Ranju Singh	
North	14				Shri Kulbhushan Dungdung	
North	15				Smt. Punam Devi	
North	16				Shri Dinesh Ram	
North	17				Smt. Jermin Kujur	
North	18				Smt. Nazima Raja	
North	19				Smt. Shabana Khan	
North	20				Smt. Asha Devi Gupta	
North	21				Smt. Roshni Khalkho	
North	22				Shri Sunil Kumar Yadav	
North	23				Md Ehtesham	
North	24				Smt. Naziya Aslam	
North	25				Smt. Sajda Khatoon	
North	26				Smt. Vijay Laxmi Soni	
South	27				Shri Arjun Ram	
South	28				Shri Arun Kumar Jha	
South	29				Shri OM Prakash	
South	30				Smt. Rashmi Choudhary	
South	31				Smt. Soni Perween	
South	32				Smt. Reema Devi	
South	33				Shri Ashok Yadav	
South	34				Smt. Sunita Devi	
South	35				Smt. Pushpa Toppo	
South	36				Shri Vinod Kumar Singh	
South	37				Shri Jhari Linda	
South	38				Shri Deepak Kumar Lohra	
South	39				Shri Ved Prakash Singh	
East	40				Smt. Suchita Rani Ray	
East	41				Smt. Urmila Yadav	
East	42				Shri Krishna Mahto	
East	43				Smt. Shashi Singh	
East	44				Shri Firoz Alam	
East	45				Shri Nasim Gaddi	
East	46				Smt. Reeta Munda	
East	47				Smt. Kavita Sanga	
East	48				Ms. Marget Minz	
East	49				Smt. Jamila Khatoon	
East	50				Smt. Pushpa Tirkey	
East	51				Smt. Savita Linda	
East	52				Shri Niranjan Kumar	
East	53				Smt. Savita Kujur	

== Municipal budget ==
The Municipal budget is prepared by the Accounts department of Ranchi Municipal Corporation, with inputs from the different administrative departments and elected representatives. The budget is first approved by the Standing committee, after which it has to be approved by the general elected body of the corporation. After getting the approval from the corporation, it is forwarded to the state government for the final approval. The funds are generated by the corporation itself, as well as grants from the state and central governments. The budget for the year 2020–21 is ₹2,276 crores, which is around ₹100 crores less than the 2019–20 municipal budget. The reason for this has been the financial difficulties that the corporation has been facing. Expenditures for the corporation include purchasing water tanks, maintaining night shelters, construction of infrastructure such as roads and footbridges, vending zone, improving facilities at government schools. Other expenses include establishment expenditures, programmatic expenditures, procuring fogging machines, setting up ward level offices, beautification of the city, and developing software for the corporation.

== Public utilities provision ==
Ranchi Municipal Corporation provides some important services in the city. The Water Supply department issues new water connections, undertakes boring and installation of hand pumps, and collects fines for illegal connections and boring. The municipal body is responsible for the Solid Waste Management of the city, including collection and disposal of the waste. It has also constructed public toilets in Ranchi and has outsourced the maintenance to private entities. The corporation is responsible for the installation and maintenance of street lights in the city and for painting safety marking on the roads. The municipal corporation is also responsible for constructing roads, and is planning to develop sky escalators to ease traffic. It maintains municipal parks and regulates parking fees in the city. The Ranchi Municipal Corporation plans on reopening and operating the only electric crematorium in the city.

== Revenue sources ==
The following are the Income sources for the Corporation from the Central and State Government.

=== Revenue from taxes ===
Following is the Tax related revenue for the corporation.

- Property tax.
- Profession tax.
- Entertainment tax.
- Grants from Central and State Government like Goods and Services Tax.
- Advertisement tax.

=== Revenue from non-tax sources ===
Following is the Non Tax related revenue for the corporation.

- Water usage charges.
- Fees from Documentation services.
- Rent received from municipal property.
- Funds from municipal bonds.
- Waste User Charges
- Processing fees from Building Plan Approvals
- Municipal Licences Fees
- Auctions of Parking Lots
- Rent from Municipal Shops

== E-Governance initiatives ==
Promoting e-governance in the municipality is one of the 'general functions' of Ranchi Municipal Corporation. The municipal corporation is implementing e-governance facilities under the National e-Governance Plan, Jawaharlal Nehru National Urban Renewal Mission and as per the needs of the organisation. The IT department of RMC is headed by Mr.Rajesh Kumar, Department Head of IT. During his tenure RMC has achieved some milestones in e services which includes Computerization of Birth & Death Registration System, Building Plan Approval Management System using Auto-DCR, Online payment of Property Tax, Online Assessment of Properties, Single Window for Municipal License and Water Connection, Master Plan Management System, HRIS for RMC Staffs, e-Rickshaw Management System, Online Registration of Lodge, Hostel & Banquet Halls, Marriage Registration & official web portal of RMC i.e www.ranchimunicipal.com. Social Media of RMC is being handled by the IT Section of RMC.
