= Jharkhand Urban Infrastructure Development Company =

Urban infrastructure development agency in Jharkhand, India

Jharkhand Urban Infrastructure Development Company Limited
- Company type: Public sector undertaking
- Industry: Infrastructure
- Founded: November 19, 2013; 12 years ago
- Founder: Government of Jharkhand
- Headquarters: JUIDCO Building, Line Tank Road, Kutchery Chowk, Ranchi, Jharkhand, India
- Area served: Jharkhand
- Key people: Sunil Kumar, IAS (Managing Director)
- Services: Urban infrastructure development; Housing development
- Owner: Government of Jharkhand
- Website: juidco.jharkhand.gov.in

Jharkhand Urban Infrastructure Development Company Limited (abbreviated as JUIDCO) is a public sector undertaking under the Government of Jharkhand. It act as the nodal agency for the planning, implementation and management of urban infrastructure projects across the state. Headquartered in Ranchi, Jharkhand, JUIDCO undertakes development projects across Jharkhand, including construction of roads, flyovers, public buildings, and cultural centers, along with the creation of drainage networks, water supply and sewerage systems, housing projects and beautification of urban spaces.

The company operates under the administrative control of the Urban Development and Housing Department of Government of Jharkhand.

== Functions ==
JUIDCO's primary objective is to strengthen and modernize urban infrastructure across Jharkhand. Its key areas of work include:

- Strengthening Urban Infrastructure: Development of roads with integrated drainage, water supply and sewerage systems for improved urban connectivity and sanitation.
- Development of Public Amenities: Creation and maintenance of public parks, urban greenery and conservation of water bodies to promote environmental sustainability and improve the quality of life in urban areas.
- Urban Planning: Providing technical assistance and policy support for sustainable urban planning, land-use management and infrastructure prioritization.
- Housing Development: Promoting and facilitating housing projects, particularly for economically weaker sections and low-income groups in urban areas.

== See also ==
- Government of Jharkhand
- Ministry of Housing and Urban Affairs
- Rabindra Bhawan, Ranchi
