= S. M. Ziauddin =

Indian politician

S. M. Ziauddin is a politician from the state of Andhra Pradesh. He served as a member of the legislative assembly of Guntur East from Telugu Desam Party. He recently joined YSR Congress Party. Currently, he is serving as an Advisor to the Government (Minorities welfare department, Andhra Pradesh) .

His elder brother S. M. Laljan Basha is a former Member of Parliament, he died in a road accident in 2013. Jinnah Tower in Guntur was built by Lal Jan Basha (grandfather of S.M.Laljan Basha and S.M.Ziauddin).
