= Jonnalagadda, Guntur district =

Jonnalagadda
- Village
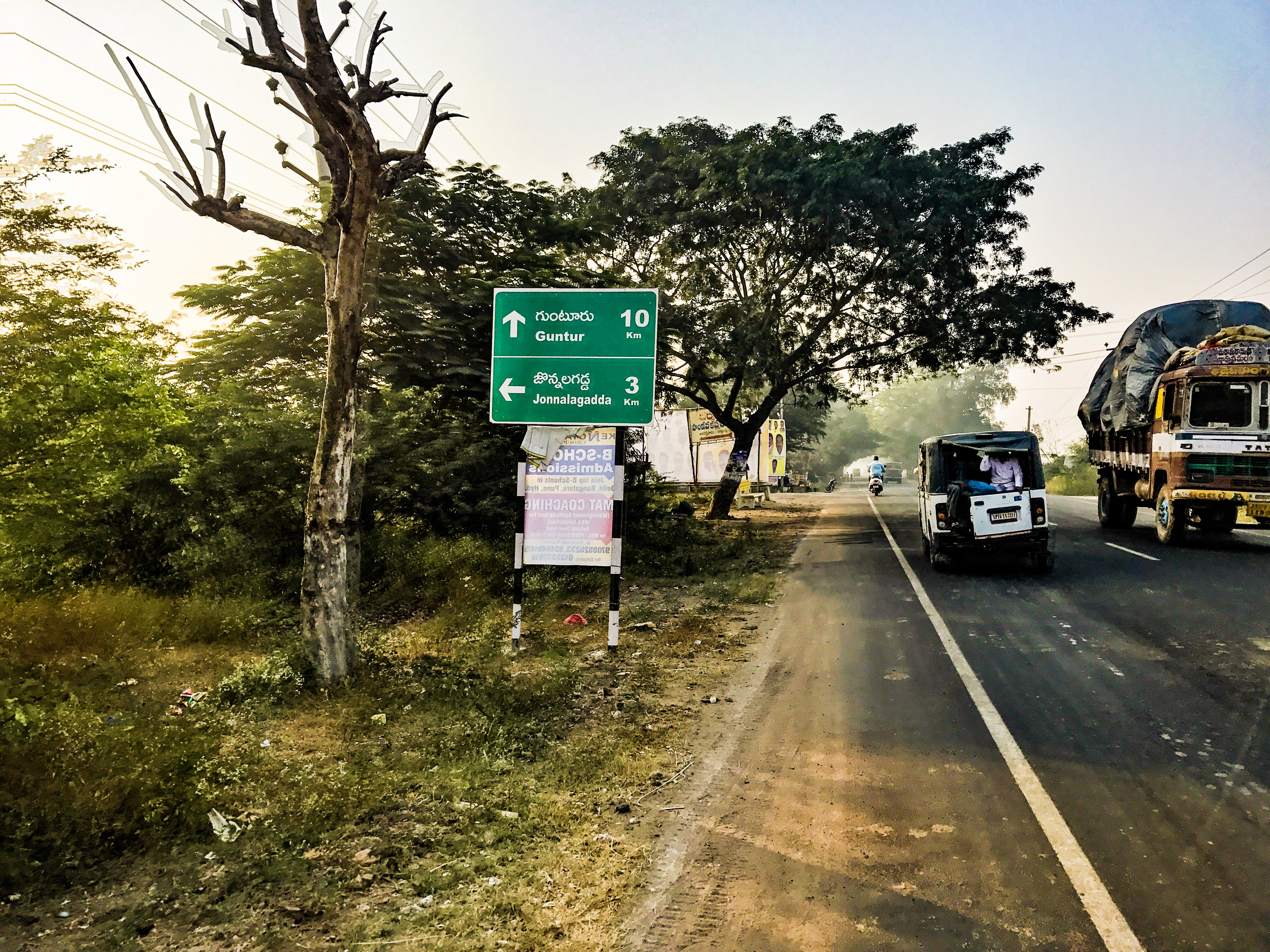
- Jonnalagadda_Signboard_on_Amaravati_road
- Interactive map of Jonnalagadda
- Location in Andhra Pradesh, India
- Coordinates: 16°23′N 80°28′E
- Country: India
- State: Andhra Pradesh
- District: Guntur
- Suburban: Guntur

Government
  - Type: Panchayati raj
  - Body: Jonnalagadda gram panchayat

Area
  - Total: 917 ha (2,270 acres)

Population (2011)
  - Total: 4,847
  - Density: 529/km^{2} (1,370/sq mi)

Languages
  - Official: Telugu
- Time zone: UTC+5:30 (IST)
- PIN: 522034
- Area code: +91–863
- Vehicle registration: AP

Jonnalagadda is a village in Guntur district of the Indian state of Andhra Pradesh. It is located in Guntur East mandal of Guntur revenue division. It is 13 km away from Guntur. Due to its proximity to the town the village boasts of many educated people. This Jonnalagadda is between Lam and Venigandla village is different village not to be confused with one near Narasarao pet. Jonnalagadda is a perfect village with soils suitable to grow rice, cotton, chillis, and rainfed crops, and dairy, several temples and churches, 3 Kalyana Mandapams, 2 elementary schools and 1 beautiful High School with 7 acres built and donated by Sri Thalla Appi Reddy/Sri Gudibandla Sambi Reddy funded by Mr.Venkata Reddy/Asha Thalla(NRI). Mr.Venkata Reddy Thalla researched deep into root causes of the problems faced by village and wrote BalaRama Krishna Pandava Rajyanga foundation model upgrading from the current worldwide outdated model.Final result of the 3 decades plus research is that any executive branch needs 4 directly elected leadership plus 4 indirectly elected leadership working together. For more information about this research result and about this village, contact Mr.Venkata Reddy Thalla who resides in Novi, MI, USA. Jonnalagadda has Veterinary hospital built by Sri Thalla Appi Reddy garu funded by his son Mr.Venkata Reddy Thalla who nominated a committee of 6 village leaders (Ex Sarpanch Sri Nama Seshagiri Rao garu, ex Sarpanch Sri Vanga Seshi Reddy garu, Sri Immadi(Alivelamma gari) Sambasiva Rao garu, Smt. Namburi Vijalaxmi garu and her husband Mohan Kumar) on the site donated by Sri Alla Bucchi Reddy garu ex Sarpanch of the village. There are many temples and churches in the village i.e. Sai baba temple,3 Vinayaka temples, Anjaneya gudi, oldest Sivalayam, Brahmmam gari gudi, 3 Ramalayams and Vinayaka gudi at bus stand and in Chalama Reddi Palem, 1 elementary school in Chalama Reddy Palem, 1 elementary school in east side, 1 elementary school in westside SC colony, 2 Poleramma temples and Boddurai near Gandhi bomma where prayers are offered on special occasions. Sankranthi festival is celebrated by conducting sports, games and sometimes yedla pandalu (bull racing), in which many people from nearby villages also take part and enjoy. Every festival is celebrated with pomp and show. Major festivals are Vinayaka chavithi, Sri Rama Navami and Dasara. For Vinayaka Chaviti, children enjoy identifying and collecting herbs for puja, preparing Ganesh idols with clay, performing puja and immersing the God in village lake. Occasionally, Poleramma jataras are performed. Jonnalagadda stands as an example for communal amity with 6 churches. Christmas is celebrated with equal fervor. Jonnalagadda has a satellite village, Chalama Reddy Palem and nearby TatiReddy Palem which is part of LAM village.

[4][2]

== Geography ==
Chinapalakaluru is situated to the north of the district headquarters, Guntur, at 16.3438°N 80.4410°E. It is spread over an area of 917 ha (2,270 acres).

== Governance ==
Jonnalagadda gram panchayat is the local self-government of the village. It is divided into 12 wards and each ward is represented by a ward member. The village forms a part of Andhra Pradesh Capital Region and is under the jurisdiction of APCRDA.

== Education ==
As per the school information report for the academic year 2018–19, the village has a total of 4 schools. These are 1 private and 4 Zilla/Mandal Parishad schools.

== See also ==
- List of villages in Guntur district
