= Medininagar Municipal Corporation =

Municipal organisation of Medininagar, India

History
- Founded: 2015; 11 years ago

Leadership
- Mayor: Aruna Shankar
- Deputy Mayor: Manoj Singh
- Municipal Commissioner: Md. Jawed Hussain (IAS)
- Seats: 35

Elections
- Last election: 2026
- Next election: 2031

Meeting place
- Kutchery Road, Medininagar, Palamu, Jharkhand

Website
- udhd.jharkhand.gov.in/ULB/Medininagar/Medininagar.aspx

Medininagar Municipal Corporation is the municipal corporation governing Indian city of Medininagar, India. The corporation is the chief nodal agency for the administration of Medininagar and was established in 2015 by a Special Act, brought by the Government of Jharkhand and first election was held in 2018.

== Overview ==
The municipal corporation consists of democratically elected members and is headed by the mayor and administers the city's infrastructure and public services. The Mayor, Deputy Mayor and Ward Councillors are chosen through direct election by all the voters residing in municipal area for a term of 5 years. The Municipal Commissioner is the head of the executive arm of the corporation. All executive powers are vested in the Municipal Commissioner who is an Indian Administrative Service (IAS) officer appointed by the Government of Jharkhand. Although the Municipal Corporation is the legislative body that lays down policies for the governance of the city, it is the Municipal Commissioner who is responsible for the execution of the policies. The Municipal Commissioner is assisted by various other officers belonging to different departments in the corporation. The Corporation is divided into 35 administrative wards. Each ward elects a councillor. By means of the standing committees, the corporation undertakes urban planning and maintains roads, government-aided schools, hospitals, and municipal markets. The functions of the corporation includes water supply, drainage and sewerage, sanitation, solid waste management, street lighting, and building regulation. It also deals with issue of birth registration and death registration. The Corporation administers an area of 110 km^{2} which has a population of 3,89,307 as per 2014 Census.

== Departments ==
Medininagar Municipal Corporation has distinct departments which covers all the aspect of city, related to development, maintenance and sanitation. It also deals with the revenue collection, legal case and financial aspects. The nine departments are:

- Engineering: This department is entrusted with the overall infrastructure development of the corporation, related to road development, water supply system, sewage system, public amenity buildings, construction and maintenance of government quarters to name a few. An executive of the cadre of Chief Engineer is responsible for this department.
- Revenue: This department is responsible for the collection of revenues and imposing levy taxes over a number of items. The Corporation gets revenue from property tax on land and buildings, water tax, tax on advertisement, toll tax, entertainment tax, tax on electricity consumption and host of other taxes.
- Urban Planning: This department's main work is to suggest the corporation on the proper planning of the area, through a master plan on a periodic basis.
- Water Supply: This department is responsible for smooth water supply in the area. The department has deep pumps in several parts of the city to supply the water in the area. During summer, the department sends water tanks to the water scarcity areas within the corporation. It is also responsible for drawing and implementation of long-term plan anticipating the future growth of the area.
- Education: This department is responsible for the eradication of Urban illiteracy within the area. It takes up educational project under the State government and implements them in Literacy backward area.
- Health & Sanitation: The two departments are entrusted with the work of providing proper health care facility and maintaining sanity of the area. Health department takes initiatives in controlling the spread of communicable diseases, food hygiene, promoting state & central government health schemes and host of other activities. Sanitation department works is to keep the city and its roads clean and free of garbage.
- Finance & Accounts: This departments maintains the records of income and expenditure of the corporation. it also prepare estimates for the grants for primary education, slum improvement, and others from the State Government. Scrutinizing the monetary bills also comes under its preview.
- Legal: This department deals with legal formalities arising for or against the corporation. It also looks into the preparation of agreements, lease, memorandum etc.
- Estate: This department deals with the lease/renewal of Corporation plots, levy and recovery of rents and other estate related activities pertaining to the city.

== Revenue ==
The following are the Income sources for the Corporation from the Central and State Government.

=== Revenue from taxes ===
Following is the Tax related revenue for the corporation:

- Property tax
- Profession tax
- Entertainment tax
- Grants from Central and State Government like Goods and Services Tax
- Advertisement tax

=== Revenue from non-tax sources ===
Following is the Non Tax related revenue for the corporation:

- Water usage charges
- Fees from Documentation services
- Rent received from municipal property
- Funds from municipal bonds
