= Jinnah Tower =

- జిన్నా టవర్ Urdu: جناح مینار (Telugu)
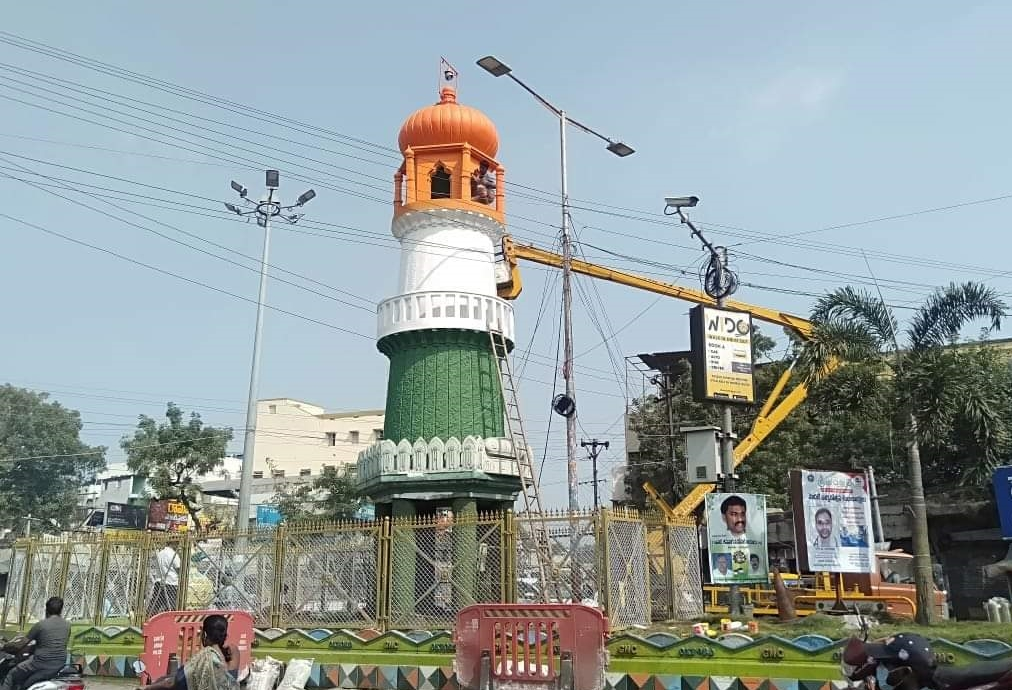
- Jinnah Tower after being painted in the colors of the Indian flag, 2022

- Location within Andhra Pradesh Location within India
- 16°17′36.5″N 80°26′51″E
- Location: Guntur, Andhra Pradesh, India

Jinnah Tower is a landmark monument in the city of Guntur in Andhra Pradesh. It is named after the founder of Pakistan, Muhammad Ali Jinnah, and is located on Mahatma Gandhi Road of the city.

== Structure ==
The tower was erected on six pillars which open to a dome, typical of the then Muslim architecture in early twentieth century. The tower is currently in a state of neglect and crumbling. According to the State Archaeology Department, the tower could be brought under the list of protected monuments if it has history of more than 60 years.

== Origins ==
About its origins, one story is that a representative of Jinnah, Liaquat Ali Khan, visited Guntur in the pre-Independence era. Khan was felicitated by Lal Jan, the grandfather of the former Rajya Sabha member, S. M. Laljan Basha and current advisor to the Government of Andhra Pradesh Minorities welfare department, S. M. Ziauddin. He is said to have built a tower to commemorate the leader of the Muslim League..

Some leaders of the Bharatiya Janata Party (BJP) have called for the structure to be renamed, criticising the naming of an Indian landmark after the founder of Pakistan, who they perceive to have split the country. In 2022, the mayor of Guntur stated that "there is nothing wrong with the name of Jinnah Tower", claiming the BJP had wished to politicize the tower for their gain. After Hindi Vahini members attempted to hoist the Indian flag and were detained on Republic Day that year, the tower was painted in the flag's tricolour scheme and a flagpole was set up nearby by MLA Mohammad Musthafa, who similarly criticized the BJP for attempting to disrupt communal harmony.
