= Guntur Municipal Corporation =

Local civic body in Guntur, Andhra Pradesh, India

Guntur Municipal Corporation Guṇṭūru Nagara Pālaka Saṃstha
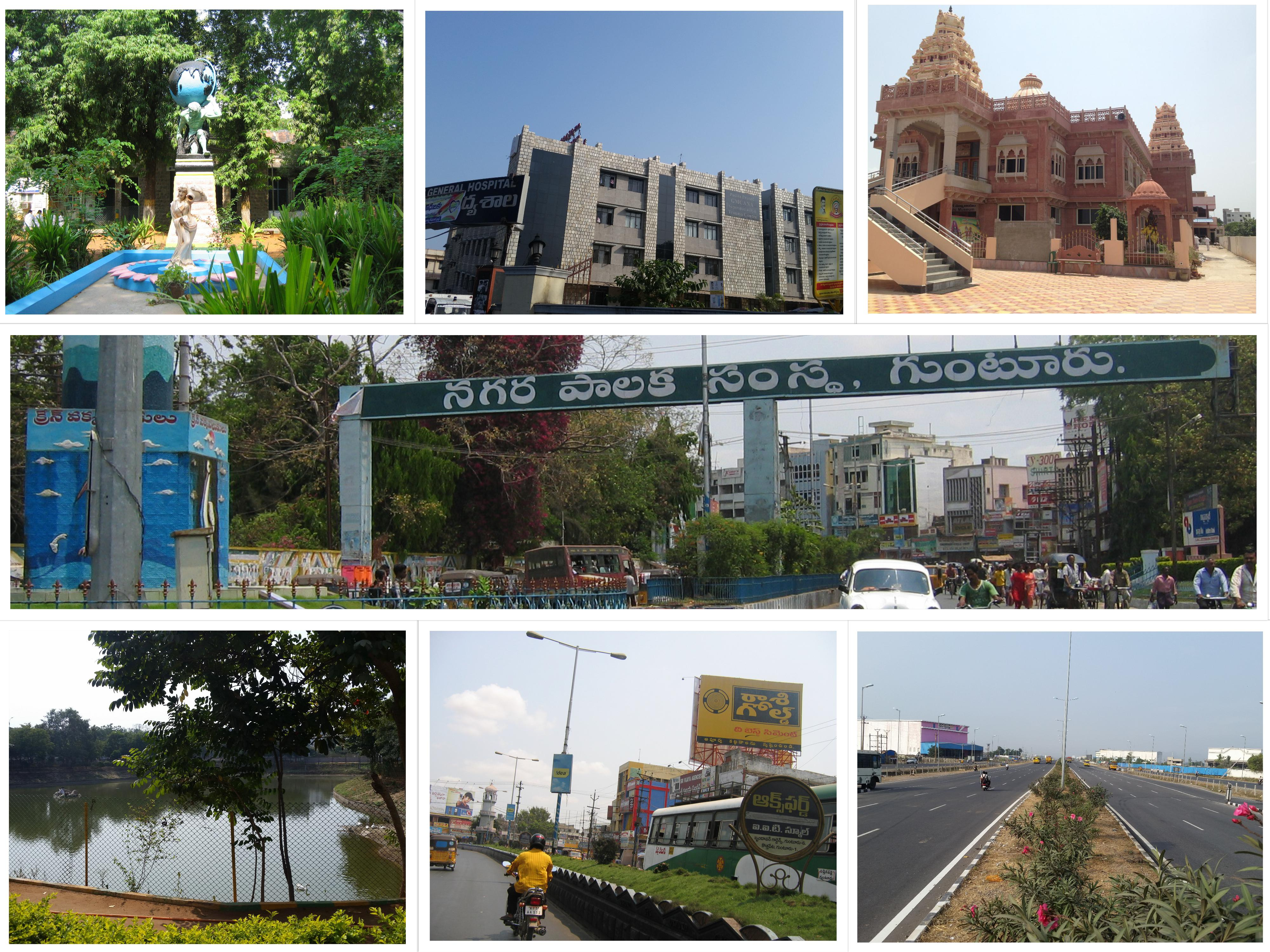

Type
- Type: Municipal corporation of the Guntur

History
- Founded: 1866; 160 years ago

Leadership
- Mayor: Kovelamudi Lakshmi Aparna, TDP
- Deputy Mayor: Vacant
- Municipal Commissioner: Kathawate Mayur Ashok, IAS

Structure
- Seats: 76 wards
- Political groups: Government (64) Kutami (64): TDP (48); JSP (13); BJP (3); Opposition (12): YSRCP (11); IND (1)

Elections
- Last election: 1 November 2026
- Next election: 2031

Website
- Official website

Guntur Municipal Corporation (GMC) is the civic body that governs the Guntur city in the Indian state of Andhra Pradesh. It is one of the oldest municipalities and the third largest municipal corporation in the state.

== History ==
Guntur municipality was constituted in the year 1866 and the first elected body was formed in 1881. The municipality was upgraded to II-Grade in 1891, I-Grade in 1917, Special Grade in 1952 and then to Selection Grade in 1960. In 1994, Guntur municipality is upgraded to Guntur Municipal Corporation was formed..

On 28 December 2025, Guntur Municipal Council had approved proposal of Greater Guntur Municipal Corporation (GGMC).The proposal has been submitted to the Government of Andhra Pradesh (GoAP) for final approval.

== Governance ==
Guntur Municipal Corporation

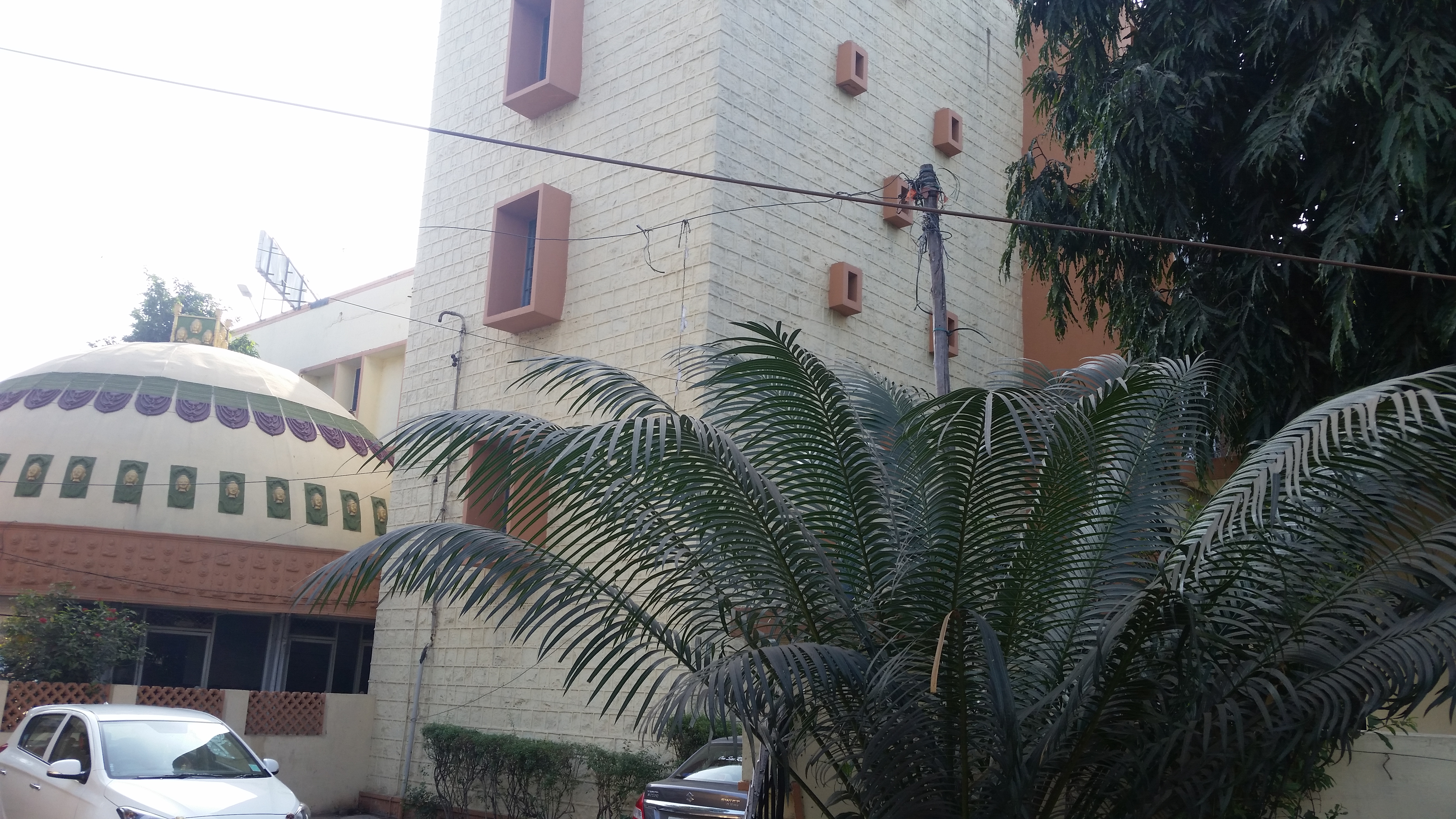
Municipal corporation office

=== Jurisdiction ===
The city limits were expanded by merging the ten surrounding villages into the corporation. The present jurisdictional area of the corporation is spread over an area of 168.41 km^{2} (65.02 sq mi) with a population of 743,354 (2011 census). There exists 57 political divisions post merger of villages into the corporation. December 2025 the city limits were expanded by merging the Eighteen surrounding villages into the corporation.

== List of Mayors ==
Guntur Municipal Corporation (GMC)
S.No.	Mayor	Deputy Mayor	Term start	Term end	Party	Notes
1.	Dr. Kolli Saradha	Chukka Yesu Ratnam	30 March 1995	29 March 2000	Telugu Desam Party	First Mayor of GMC
2.	Chukka Yesu Ratnam	K. S. Nageswara Rao	30 March 2000	29 March 2005	Telugu Desam Party	
3.	Kanna Nagaraju	Tadisetti Murali Mohan	5 October 2005	30 April 2008	Indian National Congress	
4.	Rayapati Mohan Sai Krishna	Tadisetti Murali Mohan	3 May 2008	29 September 2010	Indian National Congress	
5.	Kavati Siva Naga Manohar Naidu	Vanama Bala Vajra Babu, Sk. Sajeela	18 March 2021	15 March 2025	YSR Congress Party	
–	Sk. Sajeela	Vanama Bala Vajra Babu	21 March 2025	27 April 2025	YSR Congress Party	Interim
6.	Kovelamudi Ravindra	Vanama Bala Vajra Babu, Sk. Sajeela	28 April 2025	17 March 2026	Telugu Desam Party	
7	Kovelamudi Lakshmi Aparna		3 November 2026		Telugu Desam Party	Directly elected by the people

== Functions ==
Greater Guntur Municipal Corporation is created for the following functions:

- Planning for the town including its surroundings which are covered under its Department's Urban Planning Authority .
- Approving construction of new buildings and authorising use of land for various purposes.
- Improvement of the town's economic and Social status.
- Arrangements of water supply towards commercial, residential and industrial purposes.
- Planning for fire contingencies through Fire Service Departments.
- Creation of solid waste management, public health system and sanitary services.
- Working for the development of ecological aspect like development of Urban Forestry and making guidelines for environmental protection.
- Working for the development of weaker sections of the society like mentally and physically handicapped, old age and gender biased people.
- Making efforts for improvement of slums and poverty removal in the town.

== Revenue sources ==
The following are the Income sources for the corporation from the Central and State Government.

=== Revenue from taxes ===
Following is the Tax related revenue for the corporation.

- Property tax.
- Profession tax.
- Entertainment tax.
- Grants from Central and State Government like Goods and Services Tax.
- Advertisement tax.

=== Revenue from non-tax sources ===
Following is the Non Tax related revenue for the corporation.

- Water usage charges.
- Fees from Documentation services.
- Rent received from municipal property.
- Funds from municipal bonds.

=== Governing body ===
The Standing Committee of the corporation consists of two wings namely, executive and governing bodies. The present Municipal commissioner Puli Srinivasulu .

The below table depicts the structure of the corporation:

Standing Committee
Executive body	Governing body
Commissioner	Mayor
Additional Commissioner	Deputy Mayor
Deputy Commissioner	Standing Committee chairman
Superintending Engineer	
City Planner	
Examiner of Accounts	

== Civic services ==
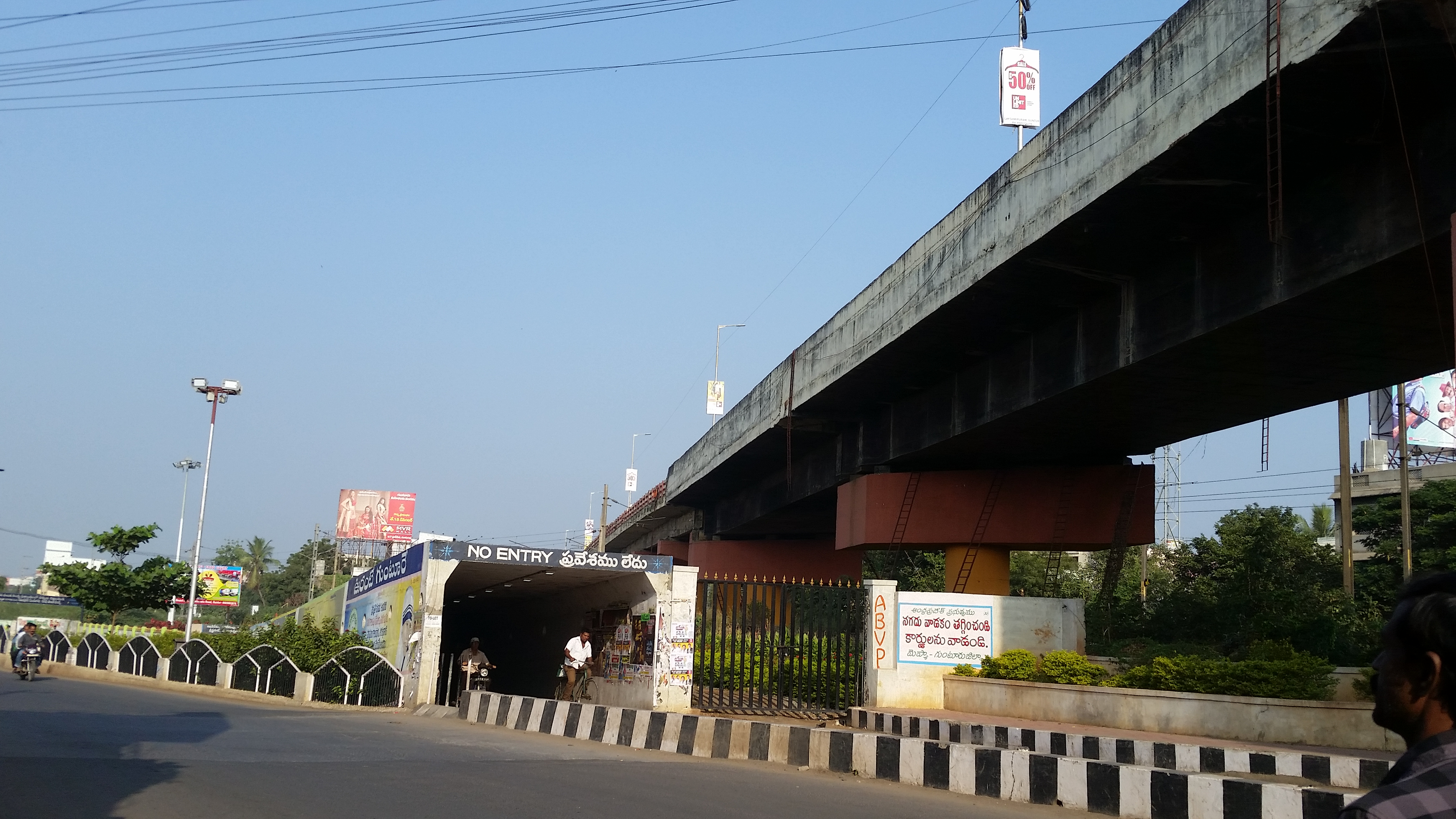
Intersection of an Over bridge, Underpass

The corporation works on improving civic needs like roads, bus shelters, pavements, public gardens etc.

=== Projects ===
A 15 MW waste-to-energy plant is set up with the collaboration of the JITF Urban Infrastructure Limited.

== Awards and achievements ==
In 2015, as per the Swachh Bharat Abhiyan of the Ministry of Urban Development, Guntur Municipal Corporation was ranked 70th in the country.

== See also ==
- List of municipal corporations in Andhra Pradesh
