= Mayor (India) =

Ceremonial head of a municipal corporation

Mayor of Municipal Corporation
- Emblem of India

- Flag of India
- Style: The Hon’ble
- Seat: Municipal Corporation Office
- Appointer: Elected by the councillors of the municipal corporation
- Term length: 5 Years
- Constituting instrument: State Municipal corporation/municipality Acts.
- Deputy: Deputy Mayor
- Salary: Varies by state

In India, a mayor is the ceremonial head of a city's municipal corporation and is often referred to as the first citizen of the city. The mayor's role is primarily ceremonial and lacks executive powers, with the municipal commissioner serving as the executive head of a municipal corporation. The method of electing mayors—whether directly or indirectly—depends on state legislation.

Municipal corporation mechanisms in India was introduced during British Raj with formation of municipal corporation in Madras (Chennai) in 1688, later followed by municipal corporations in Bombay (Mumbai) and Calcutta (Kolkata) by 1726. However the process of introduction for an elected president in the municipalities was made in Lord Mayo's Resolution of 1870. Since then the current form and structure of municipal bodies followed is similar to Lord Ripon's Resolution adopted in 1882 on local self-governance. The 74th Constitutional Amendment Act of 1992 was introduced providing for the transfer of 18 different powers to urban local bodies, including the election of a mayor and to recognise them which included municipal corporations, Nagar Panchayats, Municipal Councils.

== History and administration ==
Many municipal corporations which are headed by mayors, till the early 1990s were under the full control of the local governments with little functional, financial and administrative autonomy to the mayors. However, with the introduction of The 74th Amendment Act of 1992 made provision for the urban local bodies (ULB) as self-governing institutions. Since it came into operation in April 1993, many salutary provisions were made in the Act with positive outcomes. However steps are being taken to dilute the powers of the local governments and heads of corporations or Mayors to have complete control of urban local bodies.

A mayor of a city though formally elected from amongst the corporators holds a ceremonial post and Municipal commissioner of Corporation and his staff who are drawn from the IAS cadre and appointed by the state government controls The executive, financial and administrative powers in the corporation.

== Election and tenure ==
The method of electing mayor and their tenure varies for each city in India. In Bengaluru, Karnataka the election process is indirect with a tenure being for one year, in Mumbai Maharashtra it follows indirect elections with tenure for two and a half years and Bhopal, Madhya Pradesh follows a directly elected mayor with a term for five years.

Indian states of Bihar, Chhattisgarh, Haryana, Jharkhand, Madhya Pradesh, Odisha, Uttar Pradesh, and Uttarakhand had created respective provisions in the acts governing municipalities for the direct election of Mayors by citizens of cities.

Tenure of mayors of cities in India varies from one year to five years.

== Roles and responsibilities ==
Role of the mayor.

1) Governs the local civic body.

2) Fixed tenure varying in different towns.

3) First citizen of city .

4) Has two varied roles – Representation and upholding of the dignity of the city during ceremonial times and a presiding over discussions of the civic house with elected representatives in functional capacity.

5) The mayor's role is confined to the corporation hall of presiding authority at various meetings relating to corporation.

6) The mayor's role extends much beyond the local city and country as the presiding authority at corporation meetings during visits of a foreign dignitary to the city as he is invited by the state government to receive and represent the citizens to the guest of honour.

7) At government, civic and other social functions he is given prominence.

== Important actions ==
1. In 2021, All-India Mayor's Council held its 111th Convocation in Ayodhya, Uttar Pradesh, India, with where the council head and mayors of different states of India demanded rule of one nation and one election.
