= Municipal commissioner (India) =

Executive head of a municipal corporation in India

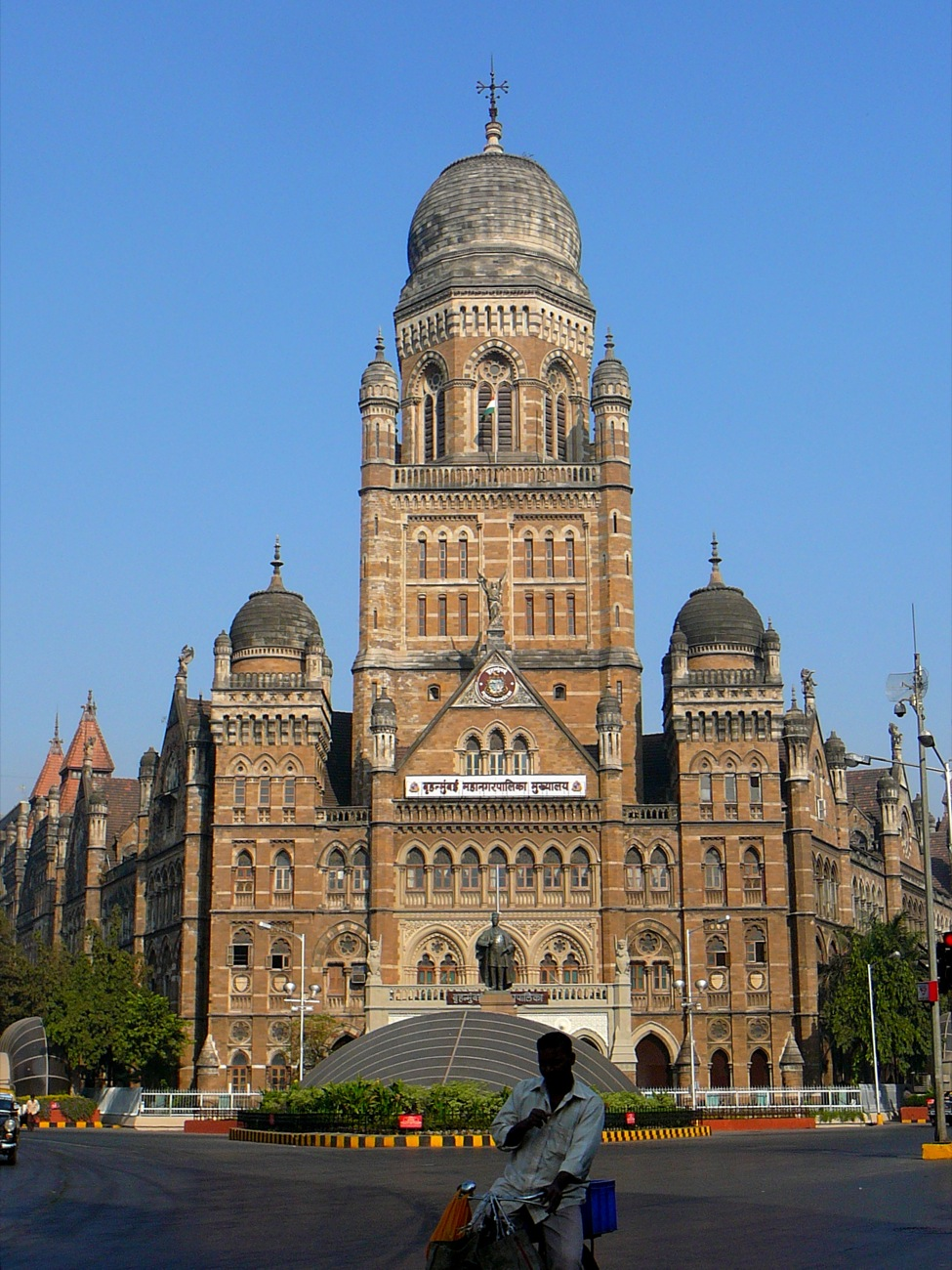
Brihanmumbai Municipal Corporation in Mumbai

In India, the municipal commissioner or municipal secretary or corporation secretary is the chief executive officer and administrative head of a municipal corporation. Unlike the mayor, who is the elected (directly or indirectly) ceremonial head, the municipal commissioner is a civil servant appointed by the state government.

== Administration ==
Every municipal corporation in India is administratively headed by a municipal commissioner or municipal secretary, the form of government which is usually granted to a city of more than one million in population.

While a mayor is elected to serve as the ceremonial head of a municipal corporation, a municipal commissioner or municipal secretary is appointed by the state government from the Indian Administrative Service or Provincial Civil Service to head the administrative staff of the municipal corporation, to implement the decisions of the corporation, and prepare its annual budget.

In cities other than New Delhi, Mumbai, Chennai, Kolkata, Ahmedabad, and Bangalore, officials from the IAS as well as the State Civil Service are appointed. They are assisted by many additional municipal commissioners, Joint Municipal Commissioners, Deputy Municipal Commissioners and Assistant Municipal Commissioners.

A Nagar Panchayat is set up for small towns. A small city has Municipal Council. A Municipal Corporation is set up for large populations of over 200,000.

== See also ==
- Commissioner of Police (India)
- District Magistrate
