= Galla =

Galla may refer to:

== Given name ==
- Galla (wife of Julius Constantius), member of the Constantinian dynasty
- Galla (wife of Theodosius I) (370s–394), empress of the Roman Empire
- Galla (wife of Eucherius) (c. 380–420s), wife of Eucherius, saint and Archbishop of Lyon
- Galla Placidia (392–450), daughter of Emperor Theodosius I
- Galla of Rome (died 550), Roman saint
- Galla Gaulo, fifth traditional Doge of Venice (755–756)

== Surname ==
=== Telugu people ===
- Galla Aruna Kumari (born 1949), government minister of Andhra Pradesh, wife of Galla Ramachandra Naidu and mother of Galla Jayadev
- Galla Ramachandra Naidu (born 1938), Indian industrialist, founder and former CEO of Amaraja Group, father of Galla Jayadev
- Galla Jayadev (born 1966), Indian politician and industrialist
- Galla Madhavi (born 1984), Indian politician

=== Other people ===
- Rainer Galla (born 1961), German politician
- Ryszard Galla, Polish politician

== Places ==
- Galle, Sri Lanka, romanized as Gālla, a city
- Galla Township, Pope County, Arkansas, United States

== Other uses ==
- Another name for P'tcha, a traditional Ashkenazi Jewish food
- Outdated exonym for the Oromo people of Ethiopia and northern Kenya
- Galla (mythology), Mesopotamian guardians of the underworld, also known as Gallu

== See also ==
- Apostolic Vicariate of the Galla, a Roman Catholic Apostolic Vicariate embracing the territory of the Oromo people
- Galla tinctoria, the commercial nutgall produced by the gall oak
