= Chirala Assembly constituency =

Constituency of the Andhra Pradesh Legislative Assembly, India

Coordinates: 15.82°N 80.36°E

Chirala
- Constituency No. 106 for the Andhra Pradesh Legislative Assembly
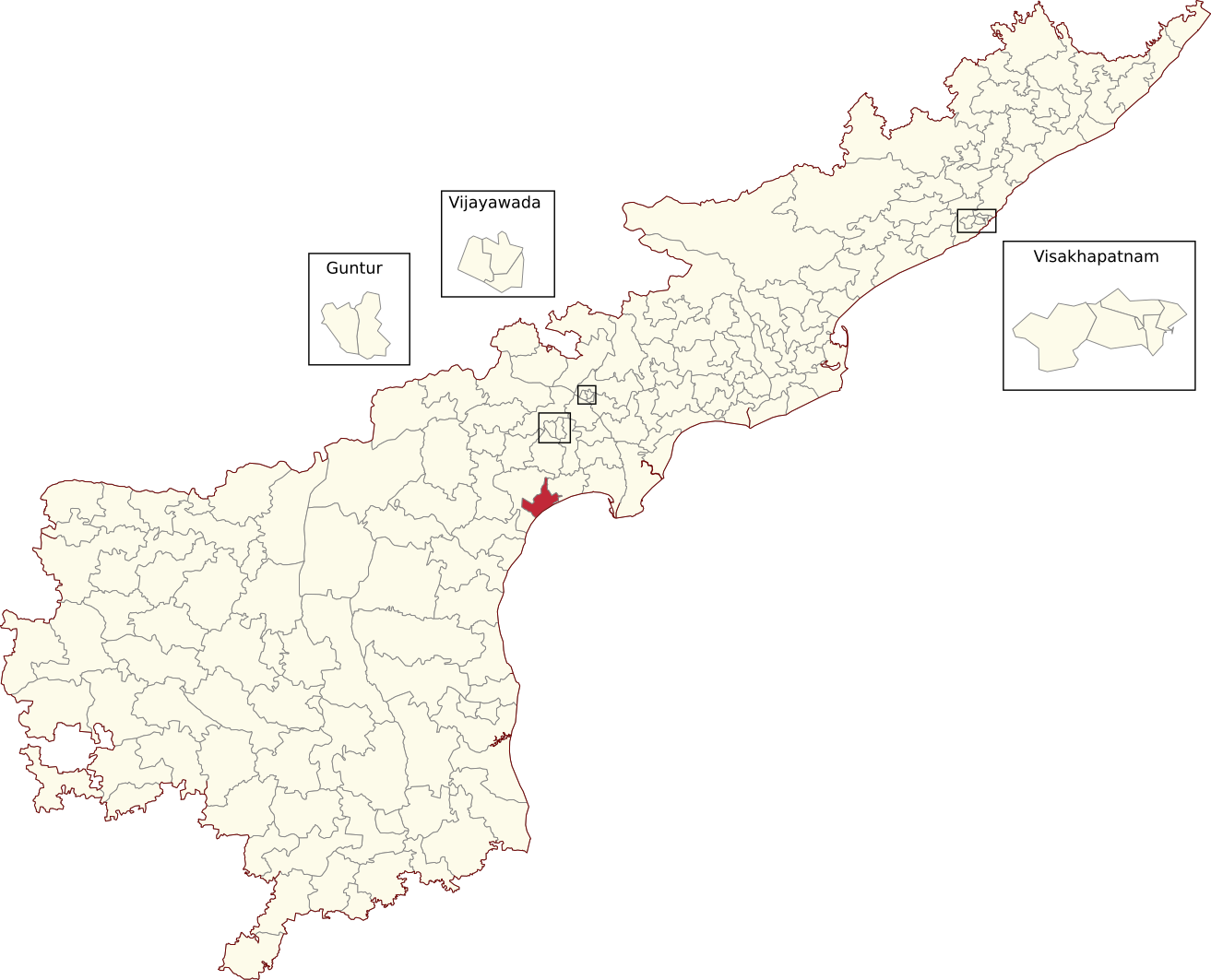
- Location of Chirala Assembly constituency within Andhra Pradesh

Constituency details
- Country: India
- Region: South India
- State: Andhra Pradesh
- District: Bapatla
- Lok Sabha constituency: Bapatla
- Established: 1951
- Total electors: 190,408
- Reservation: None

Member of Legislative Assembly
- 16th Andhra Pradesh Legislative Assembly
- Incumbent Madduluri Malakondaiah Yadav
- Party: TDP
- Alliance: NDA
- Elected year: 2024

Chirala Assembly constituency is a constituency in Bapatla district of Andhra Pradesh that elects representatives to the Andhra Pradesh Legislative Assembly in India. It is one of the seven assembly segments of Bapatla Lok Sabha constituency.

Madduluri Malakondaiah Yadav is the current MLA of the constituency, having won the 2024 Andhra Pradesh Legislative Assembly election from Telugu Desam Party. As of 2024, there are a total of 190,408 electors in the constituency. The constituency was established in 1951, as per the Delimitation Orders (1951).

== Mandals ==
Mandal
Chirala
Vetapalem

Mandals in Chirala Assembly Constituency

== Members of the Legislative Assembly ==
Year	Member	Political party
1952	Pragada Kotaiah	Kisan Mazdoor Praja Party
1955	Pragada Kotaiah	Indian National Congress
1962	Jagarlamudi Lakshminarayana Chowdary	Communist Party of India
1967	Pragada Kotaiah	Indian National Congress
1972	Kotaiah Guddanti	Indian National Congress
1978	Mutte Venkateswarlu	Indian National Congress (I)
1981 by-election	Sajja Chandramouli	Janata Party
1983	Chimata Sambu	Telugu Desam Party
1985	Sajja Chandramouli	Telugu Desam Party
1989	Konijeti Rosaiah	Indian National Congress
1994	Paleti Rama Rao	Telugu Desam Party
1999	Paleti Rama Rao	Telugu Desam Party
2004	Konijeti Rosaiah	Indian National Congress
2009	Amanchi Krishna Mohan	Indian National Congress
2014	Amanchi Krishna Mohan	Independent
2019	Karanam Balaram Krishna Murthy	Telugu Desam Party
2024	Madduluri Malakondaiah Yadav	Telugu Desam Party

== Election results ==
=== 1952 ===
1952 Madras State Legislative Assembly election: Chirala
Party	Candidate	Votes	%	±%
KMPP	Pragada Kotaiah	16,521	31.89	
Independent	Uthukuri Upendra Gupta	8,290	16.00	
KLP	Doggapati Raghavaiah	8,247	15.92	
Independent	Sabhanam Ramasubba Rao	6,149	11.87	
Independent	Nukalapati Joseph	5,437	10.49	
INC	Salagala Benjamin	5,123	9.89	9.89
Independent	Bavanam Kotireddi	1,365	2.63	
Independent	S. A. Basid	678	1.31	
Margin of victory		8,231	15.89	
Turnout		51,810	70.28	
Registered electors		73,719		
KMPP win (new seat)				

=== 1955 ===
1955 Andhra State Legislative Assembly election: Chirala
Party	Candidate	Votes	%	±%
INC	Pragada Kotaiah	24,598	57.04	
CPI	Jagarlamudi Lakshmi Narayana Chowdary	18,525	42.96	
Margin of victory		6,073	14.08	
Turnout		43,123	69.32	
Registered electors		62,205		
INC gain from KMPP		Swing		

=== 1962 ===
1962 Andhra Pradesh Legislative Assembly election: Chirala
Party	Candidate	Votes	%	±%
CPI	Jagarlamudi Lakshmi Narayana Chowdary	25,164	45.05	
INC	Pragada Kotaiah	20,136	36.05	
Margin of victory		5,028	9.00	
Turnout		57,252	80.81	
Registered electors		70,851		
CPI gain from INC		Swing		

=== 1967 ===
1967 Andhra Pradesh Legislative Assembly election: Chirala
Party	Candidate	Votes	%	±%
INC	Pragada Kotaiah	25,704	46.67	
Independent	Konijeti Rosaiah	23,138	42.01	
Margin of victory		2,566	4.66	
Registered electors		74,697		
Turnout		57,298	76.71	
INC gain from CPI		Swing		

=== 1972 ===
1972 Andhra Pradesh Legislative Assembly election: Chirala
Party	Candidate	Votes	%	±%
INC	Kotaiah Guddanti	29,476	49.01	
Independent	Sajja Chandramouli	28,878	48.02	
Margin of victory		598	0.99	
Registered electors		82,908		
Turnout		61,065	73.65	
INC hold		Swing		

=== 1978 ===
1978 Andhra Pradesh Legislative Assembly election: Chirala
Party	Candidate	Votes	%	±%
INC(I)	Mutte Venkateswarlu	36,114	43.47	
JP	Sajja Chandramouli	34,257	41.23	
Margin of victory		1,857	2.24	
Registered electors		111,408		
Turnout		84,384	75.74	
INC gain from INC		Swing		

=== 1983 ===
1983 Andhra Pradesh Legislative Assembly election: Chirala
Party	Candidate	Votes	%	±%
TDP	Chimata Sambu	50,205	60.33	
INC	Bandla Bala Venkateswarlu	16,518	19.85	
Margin of victory		33,687	40.48	
Registered electors		133,603		
Turnout		84,276	63.08	
TDP gain from INC(I)		Swing		

=== 1985 ===
1985 Andhra Pradesh Legislative Assembly election: Chirala
Party	Candidate	Votes	%	±%
TDP	Sajja Chandramouli	44,156	51.57	
INC	Ande Narasimha Rao	35,384	41.32	
Margin of victory		8,772	10.24	
Registered electors		131,597		
Turnout		86,830	65.98	
TDP hold		Swing		

=== 1989 ===
1989 Andhra Pradesh Legislative Assembly election: Chirala
Party	Candidate	Votes	%	±%
INC	Konijeti Rosaiah	64,235	60.08	
TDP	Chimata Sambu	40,902	38.26	
Margin of victory		23,333	21.83	
Registered electors		159,095		
Turnout		109,772	69.00	
INC gain from TDP		Swing		

=== 1994 ===
1994 Andhra Pradesh Legislative Assembly election: Chirala
Party	Candidate	Votes	%	±%
TDP	Paleti Rama Rao	54,039	49.38	
INC	Konijeti Rosaiah	50,433	46.08	
Margin of victory		3,606	3.29	
Registered electors		152,178		
Turnout		110,809,394	72.82	
TDP gain from INC		Swing		

=== 1999 ===
1999 Andhra Pradesh Legislative Assembly election: Chirala
Party	Candidate	Votes	%	±%
TDP	Paleti Rama Rao	60,806	54.77	
INC	Anjalee Devi Goli	47,298	42.60	
Margin of victory		13,508	12.17	
Registered electors		180,481		
Turnout		113,394	62.83	
TDP hold		Swing		

=== 2004 ===
2004 Andhra Pradesh Legislative Assembly election: Chirala
Party	Candidate	Votes	%	±%
INC	Konijeti Rosaiah	73,497	61.93	+19.33
TDP	Paleti Rama Rao	43,420	36.59	−18.18
Majority		30,077	25.34	
Turnout		118,670	75.26	+13.74
INC gain from TDP		Swing		

=== 2009 ===
2009 Andhra Pradesh Legislative Assembly election: Chirala
Party	Candidate	Votes	%	±%
INC	Amanchi Krishna Mohan	56,600	43.63	−18.30
TDP	Janjanam Srinivasarao	45,314	34.93	−1.66
PRP	Paleti Rama Rao	21,482	16.56	
Majority		11,286	9.70	
Turnout		129,737	79.20	+3.94
INC hold		Swing		

=== 2014 ===
2014 Andhra Pradesh Legislative Assembly election: Chirala
Party	Candidate	Votes	%	±%
Independent	Amanchi Krishna Mohan	57,544	37.30	
TDP	Pothula Suneetha	47,209	30.60	
YSRCP	Balaji Yadam	40,955	26.47	
Majority		10,335	6.70	
Turnout		154,700	81.56	+2.36
Independent gain from INC		Swing		

=== 2019 ===
2019 Andhra Pradesh Legislative Assembly election: Chirala
Party	Candidate	Votes	%	±%
TDP	Karanam Balaram Krishna Murthy	83,901	53.27	+22.67
YSRCP	Amanchi Krishna Mohan	66,482	42.21	+15.74
Majority		17,419	26.20	
Turnout		157,511	na	na
TDP gain from Independent		Swing		

=== 2024 ===
2024 Andhra Pradesh Legislative Assembly election: Chirala
Party	Candidate	Votes	%	±%
TDP	Madduluri Malakondaiah Yadav	72,700	42.68	
YSRCP	Karanam Venkatesh	51,716	30.36	
INC	Amanchi Krishna Mohan	41,859	24.58	
NOTA	None Of The Above	1,255	0.74	
Majority		20,984	12.31	
Turnout		1,70,328		
TDP hold		Swing		

== See also ==
- List of constituencies of Andhra Pradesh Legislative Assembly
