= Machavaram =

Machavaram may refer to the following places in India:

- Machavaram, Palnadu district, Andhra Pradesh
- Machavaram, Medak, Telangana
- Machavaram, Amalapuram, East Godavari
