= Bharati Devi Ranga =

Indian freedom fighter

Bharati Devi Gogineni
- Born: 1908; Machavaram, Bapatla taluq, Guntur district, India
- Died: 27 September 1972 (aged 63–64)
- Education: Ruskin School of Art, Oxford
- Occupations: Freedom fighter, politician
- Known for: Civil Disobedience Movement, women's rights advocacy
- Office: Member of Andhra Pradesh Legislative Council
- Political party: Indian National Congress; Krishikar Lok Party; Swatantra Party
- Spouse: N. G. Ranga

Bharati Devi Gogineni, also known as Bharathi Devi and Bharati Devi Ranga (1908–1972), was an Indian freedom fighter and political figure. She participated in the Civil Disobedience Movement in 1932, facing a year-long sentence. She is known for organizing women Satyagrahis and Harijan Day Celebrations, advocating for inter-caste marriages. Elected in 1958, she served as a Member of the Andhra Pradesh Legislative Council. She was the spouse of farmer leader N. G. Ranga.

== Early life ==
She was born in 1908 in Machavaram, Bapatla taluq, Guntur district. She was a resident of Nidubrolu. Her early education took place at Sarada Niketan in Guntur. Later, she studied at the Ruskin School of Art, Oxford, from 1925 to 1926.

== Career ==
During the Civil Disobedience Movement in 1932, she organized women Satyagrahis in Guntur, West Godavari, and Krishna district, playing a prominent role in organizing women volunteers. She was sentenced to one year in prison and fined 500 rupees on 2 February 1931, for her involvement in the freedom movement. She served her sentence in Vellore jail and was injured during the Venkatagiri Zamindari Ryots campaign.

Bharati Devi organized Harijan Day celebrations, advocating inter-dining with Dalit and promoting inter-caste marriages. She served as the President of Andhra Kisaan Congress from 1940 to 1942. She also raised funds for the defense of Madras Kissans in 1940.

Bharati Devi was a member of the Madras State Educational Advisory Committee from 1946 to 1947.

In 1956, she presided over the Andhra Women's Conference at Ghantasala, Krishna district, where she actively worked towards achieving equal property rights for women. During the Rayalaseema famine in 1952–53, she provided service by collecting cattle feeds, food grains, and clothes, distributing them in the affected areas, Due to her work, she was referred to as Annapurna by the people.

She along with her husband N. G. Ranga founded the Rayalaseema Organisation of Summer Schools of Economics and Politics in 1938, situated in Madanapalle, with a focus on rural activities. They organized various events, including the Rayalaseema Ryots Conference, Rayalseema Economic Development Conference, Rayalaseema Forest Ryots Conference, Rayalaseema Teachers Conference, Rayalaseema Peasants Institute, Rayalaseema Students Conference, Rayalaseema Youth Conference, Rayalaseema Progressive Writers Conference, Rayalaseema Cotton Growers Conference, Rayalaseema Oil-Seeds Producers or Dealers Conference, Rayalaseema Famine Relief Conference, and Rayalaseema Irrigation Development Conference along with various other platforms for women, panchayat boards, and co-operative societies.

In 1958, she was elected as a Member of the Legislative Council from Andhra Pradesh. She died on 27 September 1972.
