= Galla Aruna Kumari =

Indian politician (born 1944)

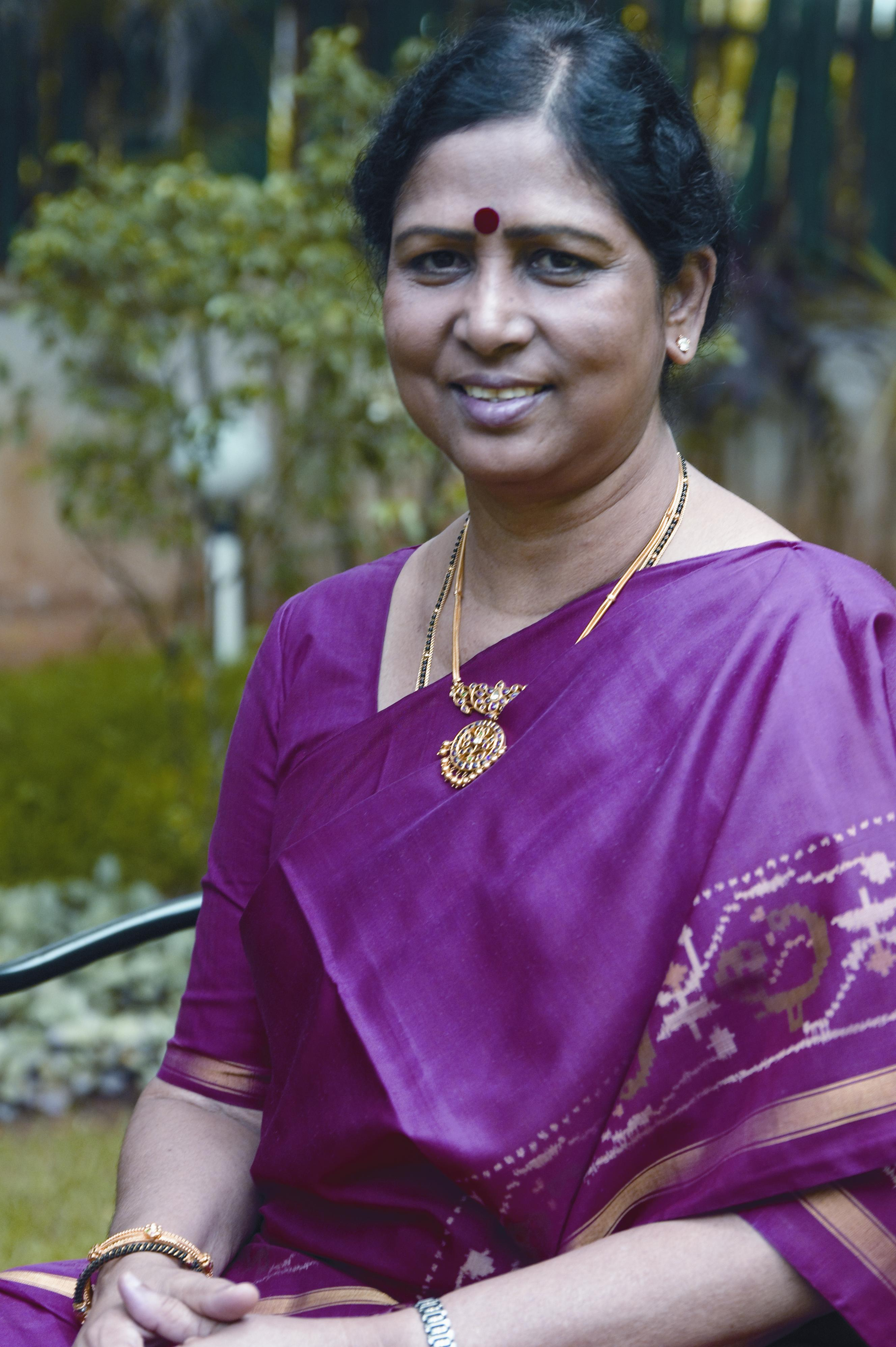

Minister for Mines & Geology Government of United Andhra Pradesh
- In office 24 November 2010 – 21 February 2014
- Governor: E. S. L. Narasimhan
- Chief Minister: Nallari Kiran Kumar Reddy
- Preceded by: Vijaya Ramaraju Setrucharla
- Succeeded by: Peethala Sujatha

Minister of Roads Buildings Government of United Andhra Pradesh
- In office 25 May 2009 – 23 November 2010
- Governor: N. D. Tiwari
- Chief Minister: Y. S. Rajasekhara Reddy; Konijeti Rosaiah
- Preceded by: T. Jeevan Reddy
- Succeeded by: Pithani Satyanarayana

Minister of Medical Education & Health Insurance Government of United Andhra Pradesh
- In office 14 May 2004 – 20 May 2009
- Governor: Surjit Singh Barnala; Sushilkumar Shinde; Rameshwar Thakur; N. D. Tiwari
- Chief Minister: Y.S.Rajasekhara Reddy
- Preceded by: N. M. D. Farooq; Nagam Janardhan Reddy
- Succeeded by: Danam Nagender; Sake Sailajanath

Member of Legislative Assembly United Andhra Pradesh
- In office 1999–2014
- Preceded by: Nara Ramamurthy Naidu
- Succeeded by: United Andhra Pradesh Assembly Divided
- Constituency: Chandragiri
- In office 1989–1994
- Preceded by: N. R. Jayadeva Naidu
- Succeeded by: Nara Ramamurthy Naidu
- Constituency: Chandragiri

Personal details
- Born: 1 August 1944 (age 81) Diguvamagham, Madras Presidency, British India (now in Andhra Pradesh, India)
- Party: Telugu Desam Party (2014 - present)
- Other party: Indian National Congress (1989 - 2014)
- Spouse: Galla Ramachandra Naidu
- Children: Jayadev Galla
- Parent: Paturi Rajagopala Naidu (father)

Galla Aruna Kumari (born 1 August 1944) is an Indian politician from Andhra Pradesh. She is a four time Member of the Legislative Assembly and former minister in the Government of Andhra Pradesh before bifurcation. She represented the Indian National Congress from Chandragiri Assembly constituency.

== Early life and education ==
Kumari was born on 1 August 1944 in Diguvamagham, Chittoor, Andhra Pradesh. She is the daughter of former Indian parliamentarian and social activist Paturi Rajagopala Naidu. She married Galla Ramachandra Naidu, an industrialist and founder of Amara Raja Group of Companies. She did her SSLC at ZP High School, Aragonda, Chittoor in 1959. Later, she did her B.S. in computer science in 1971 at Lake View College, Chicago, US. She worked for the Chrysler Corporation as computer programmer and departmental head for Management Information Systems in the sales division.

== Political career ==
Kumari was first elected as an MLA from Chandragiri Assembly constituency winning the 1989 Andhra Pradesh Legislative Assembly electionrepresenting the Indian National Congress Party. She lost the next election to Nara Ramamurthy Naidu of the Telugu Desam Party. She regained the seat for the Indian National Congress in the 1999 Andhra Pradesh Legislative Assembly election and later won the 1994 and 1999 Assembly elections to make it three consecutive wins.

She served as the President of the Andhra Pradesh Mahila Congress and general secretary of the Pradesh Congress Committee. She was minister for the Health Education and Insurance, and for Mines and Geology during the first term of Andhra Pradesh chief minister late Y. S. Rajasekhara Reddy

=== Autobiography ===
In September 2024, her autobiography was released along with writer Volga, Eenadu editor M. Nageswara Rao and, Dravidian University former vice-chancellor Kolakaluri Madhujyothi in Tirupati.
