= P. Ankineedu Prasada Rao =

Indian politician

Member of Parliament, Lok Sabha
- In office 1977-1984
- Succeeded by: Chimata Sambu
- Constituency: Bapatla
- In office 1971-1977
- Preceded by: Kongara Jaggayya
- Succeeded by: P Venkata reddy
- Constituency: Ongole

Personal details
- Born: February 23, 1929 Nidubrolu, Guntur district, Madras Presidency, British India (presently Andhra Pradesh, India)
- Died: August 27, 1997 (aged 68) Vijayawada, Andhra Pradesh
- Party: Indian National Congress
- Spouse: Sivaprada Devi

Pamulapati Ankineedu Prasada Rao was an Indian politician. He was a Member of Parliament, of the Lok Sabha, the lower house of India's Parliament, as a member of the Indian National Congress.

== Early life ==
Pamulapati Ankineedu Prasada Rao was born in Nidubrolu in Guntur district, Andhra Pradesh on February 23, 1929. He graduated from A.C. college, Guntur.

== Political career ==
He was elected as a member of Legislative Assembly in 1967 from Ponnuru Assembly constituency.

He worked as a Minister of Commerce in Kasu Brahmananda Reddy cabinet in Andhra Pradesh during1969-71.

He was elected as a member of 5th Lok sabha (1971–77) from Ongole and 6th Lok sabha (1977–79) and 7th Lok sabha(1980–84) form Bapatla constituency.

He worked as Union Minister of State for Tourism and Civil Aviation in Charan Singh ministryduring August–November, 1979.
