= Ponnur =

Ponnur Swarnapuri
- Town
- Location in Andhra Pradesh, India
- Coordinates: 16.0667°N 80.5667°E
- Country: India
- State: Andhra Pradesh
- District: Guntur

Government
  - MLA: Dhulipalla Narendra Kumar

Area
  - Total: 26.14 km^{2} (10.09 sq mi)

Population (2011)
  - Total: 59,913
  - Density: 2,292/km^{2} (5,936/sq mi)

Languages
  - Official: Telugu
- Time zone: UTC+5:30 (IST)
- PIN: 522 124
- Telephone code: +91–8643
- Sex ratio: 1:0.96 ♂/♀
- Website: ponnur.cdma.ap.gov.in/en

Ponnur is a town in the Guntur district of the Indian state of Andhra Pradesh. A road to Chandole goes south-east and comes to Nidubrolu, where there is a temple with a stone-bearing inscription recording the erection of 90 temples in 1132 CE. An ancient Telugu manuscript entitled 'Ponnuru-Chandavolu Shasanam' was present in Potti Sreeramulu Telugu University. Dhulipalla Narendra Kumar of the Telugu Desam Party is the current MLA of the constituency, who won the 2024 Andhra Pradesh Legislative Assembly election. It is a municipality, and the mandal headquarter of Ponnur mandal is under the Tenali revenue division.

== Demographics ==
As of 2011 Census of India, the town had a population of 59,913 with 16,138 households. The total population constitute, 29,486 males and 30,427 — a sex ratio of 1032 females per 1000 males, higher than the national average of 940 per 1000. 5,507 children are in the age group of 0–6 years. The average literacy rate stands at 78.33% with 42,617 literates, higher than the national average of 73.00%.

== Government and politics ==
=== Civic administration ===
Ponnur Municipality oversees the civic needs of the town, like water supply, roads, sewage, garbage collection, etc. It is classified as a Grade–II municipality, which was established in 1964 as a III-Grade municipality. It has an extent of 25.64 km^{2} (9.90 mi^{2}) with 31 wards. The town gets water from the Krishna river, which is supplied through taps, bores etc. The town has both government and private hospitals, which include clinics, nursing homes, and a government hospital for public healthcare. It also maintains parks and playgrounds for recreational purpose

=== Politics ===
Ponnur, being a part of Ponnur mandal, falls under the Ponnur assembly constituency of the Andhra Pradesh Legislative Assembly. Dhulipalla Narendra Kumar is the present MLA of the constituency from the Telugu Desam Party. The assembly segment is in turn a part of Guntur Lok Sabha constituency and the present Member of Parliament is Chandra Sekhar Pemmasani of the Telugu Desam Party.

== Economy ==
Ponnur is an important town for the nearby villages. The rural areas surrounding the town are mostly dependent on agriculture. The farming is dominant with paddy cultivation, and other crops include ground nuts, cotton, betel, etc. There are several other economic industries and occupations in the town, such as brickworks, furniture making, handloom weaving, spinning khadi yarn, rice mills, timber, etc. The town is also a part of the Tenali-Ponnur growth corridor.

== Culture ==
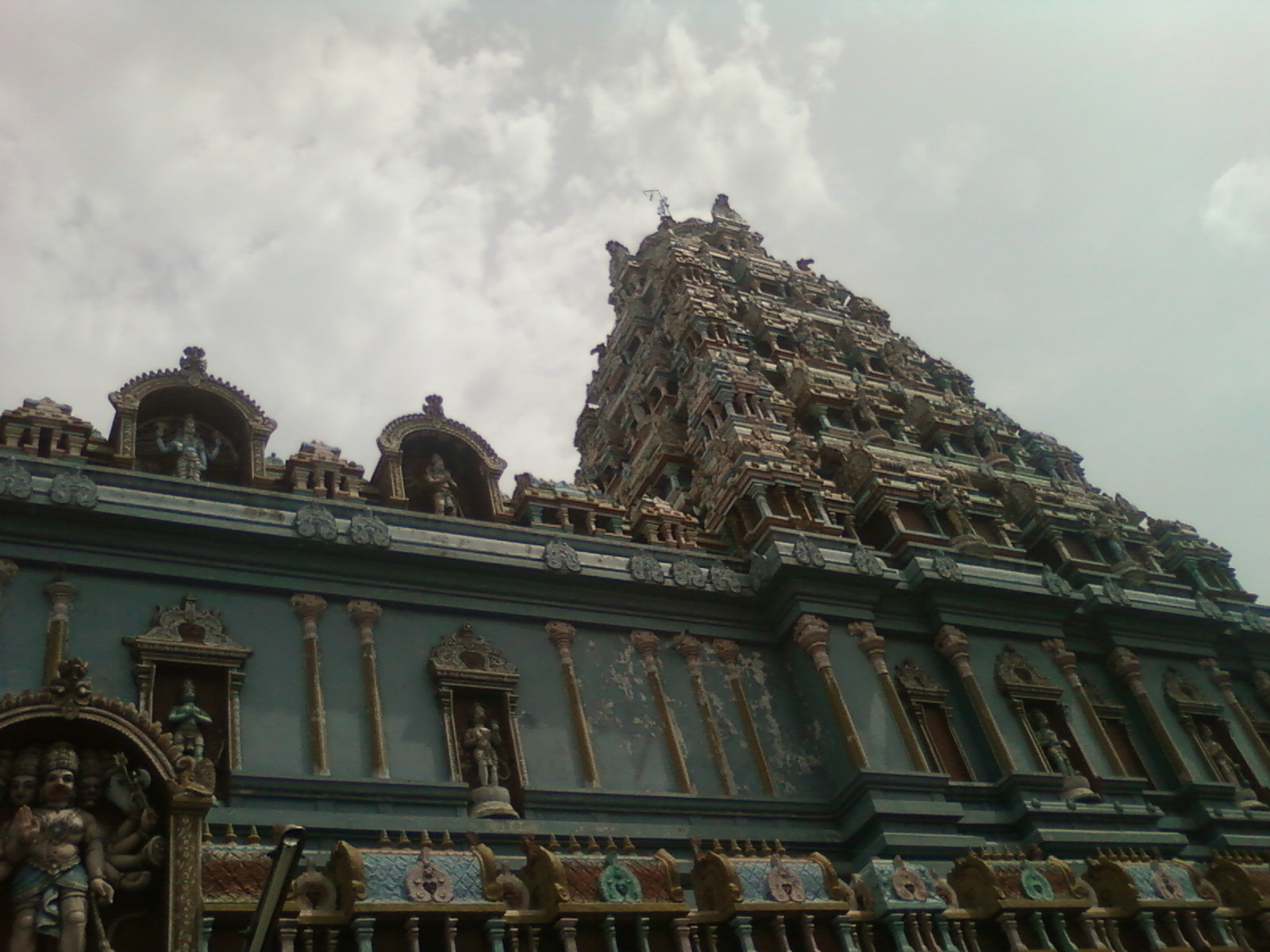
Anjaneya Temple in Ponnur

Legend about Ponnuru : Once there lived two brahmans namely Kasibhatlu, who was childless, and his sister's son, Nanduri Gunugovindu, with a deformed haunchback. They went on pilgrimage to Benares, where Kasibhatlu moved with compassion and promised Govindu that if ever a daughter should be born to him, she would be given to him in marriage. Instantly, Govindu called upon Bhava Narayana Swamy, a sacred river, and certain trees growing on the banks as witnesses. Brahmans returned to Ponnuru. A daughter was born to Kasibhatlu. When she grew up, Govindu claimed the fulfillment of the promise by Kasibhatlu. Kasibhatlu was reluctant to keep his word. Witnesses were called upon by Govindu. One night, when Kasibhatlu slept, Bhava Narayana Swamy appeared to remember his promise. In the morning, when he awoke, Kasibhatlu saw ganges and trees at the door, because of an overflowing river. Warned by witnesses, Kasibhatlu gave his daughter to Govindu in marriage. There are a few notable people from the town with their contributions to various fields, such as N. G. Ranga, Pragada Kotaiah. The town has an auditorium and a function hall for cultural events in the town.

There are many religious worship centers in the town, like temples, mosques, and churches. The most notable religious structures are the temples of Sakshi Bhavanarayana and Sahastra Lingeswara, single stone carved statues of 24 ft (7.3 m) Anjaneya and 29 ft (8.8 m) Garuthmantha.

== Transport ==
The town has a total road length of 140.05 km (87.02 mi). State Highway 48, also known as Guntur-Bapatla-Chirala Road, passes through Ponnur, which connects it with the district headquarter, Guntur. The Ponnur-Repalle Road connects National Highway 216 at Chandole. The state government operates APSRTC bus services to the nearby towns and villages. The nearest railway station is Nidubrolu, a D-category station in the Vijayawada railway division of the South Central Railway zone.

== Education ==
Zilla Parishad High School is the prominent one, run by the Panchayat Raj Department under the government of Andhra Pradesh. PBN is famous college for intermediate and degree courses. Primary and secondary school education is imparted by government, aided, and private schools, under the School Education Department of the state. The medium of instruction followed by different schools are English and Telugu.

The town has both government and private educational institutions, with a total of 34 primary, 3 upper primary, and 12 high schools. There are also two government-run junior colleges.

== See also ==
- Ramesh Ponnur
