= Konijeti Rosaiah =

Indian politician (1933–2021)

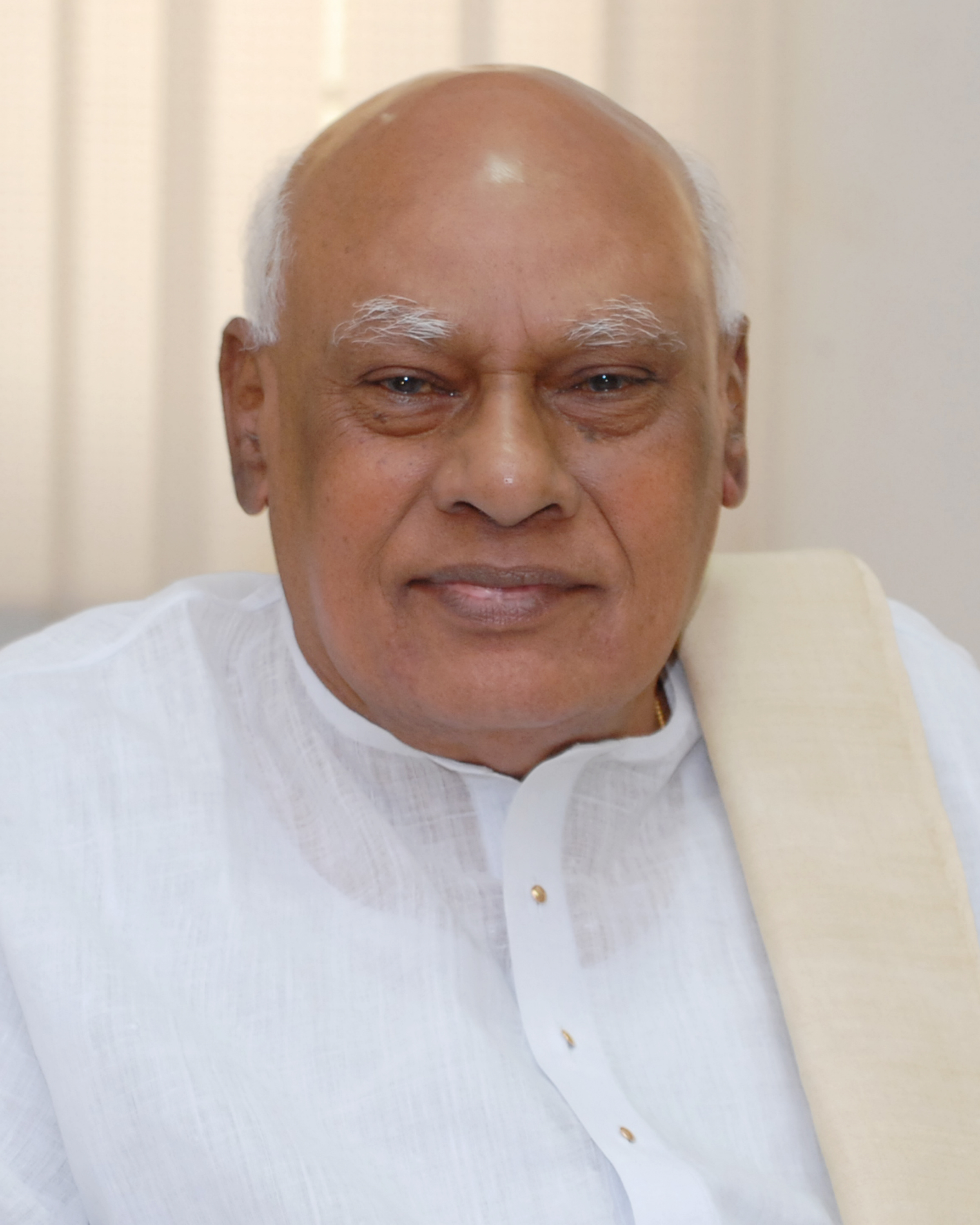

13th Governor of Tamil Nadu
- In office 31 August 2011 – 30 August 2016
- Chief Minister: J. Jayalalithaa; O. Panneerselvam
- Preceded by: Surjit Singh Barnala
- Succeeded by: C. Vidyasagar Rao (Additional charge)

Governor of Karnataka
- (Additional Charge)
- In office 28 June 2014 – 31 August 2014
- Chief Minister: Siddaramaiah
- Preceded by: H. R. Bhardwaj
- Succeeded by: Vajubhai Vala

15th Chief Minister of Andhra Pradesh
- In office 3 September 2009 – 24 November 2010
- Governor: N. D. Tiwari; E. S. L. Narasimhan
- Preceded by: Y. S. Rajasekhara Reddy
- Succeeded by: Nallari Kiran Kumar Reddy

Minister of Finance, Planning, Small Savings, Lotteries and Legislative Affairs Government of Andhra Pradesh
- In office 14 May 2004 – 2 September 2009
- Governor: Surjit Singh Barnala; Sushilkumar Shinde; Rameshwar Thakur; N. D. Tiwari
- Chief Minister: Y. S. Rajasekhara Reddy
- Preceded by: Ashok Gajapathi Raju
- Succeeded by: Himself

Member of Parliament, Lok Sabha
- In office 10 March 1998 – 26 April 1999
- Prime Minister: Atal Bihari Vajpayee
- Preceded by: Kota Saidiah
- Succeeded by: Nedurumalli Janardhana Reddy
- Constituency: Narasaraopet

Minister of Finance, Transportation Electricity and Home Affairs Government of Andhra Pradesh
- In office 3 December 1989 – 12 December 1994
- Governor: Kumudben Joshi; Krishan Kant
- Chief Minister: Marri Chenna Reddy; Nedurumalli Janardhana Reddy; Kotla Vijaya Bhaskara Reddy

Member of Legislative Assembly Andhra Pradesh
- In office 11 May 2004 – 16 May 2009
- Preceded by: Paleti Rama Rao
- Succeeded by: Amanchi Krishna Mohan
- Constituency: Chirala
- In office 1989–1994
- Preceded by: Sajja Chandramouli
- Succeeded by: Paleti Rama Rao
- Constituency: Chirala

Minister of Roads & Buildings Housing and Transportation Government of Andhra Pradesh
- In office 6 March 1978 – 9 January 1983
- Governor: K. C. Abraham
- Chief Minister: Marri Chenna Reddy; T. Anjaiah; Kotla Vijaya Bhaskara Reddy

Member of Legislative Council Andhra Pradesh
- In office 29 March 2009 – 30 August 2011
- Chairman: A. Chakrapani
- Deputy: Mohammad Jani; Nethi Vidyasagar
- Leader of the House: Y. S. Rajasekhara Reddy; Himself; Kiran Kumar Reddy
- Constituency: Elected by MLAs
- In office 1968–1985
- Chairman: Pidathala Ranga Reddy; Thota Rama Swamy; N. Venkata Subbaiah; Syed Mukasheer Shah
- Deputy: Mamidipudi Anandam; Erram Sathynarayana; Sayyad Mukhasir Shah; Kancherla Keshava Rao; Thota Panchajanyam; Appanaboyina Chakrapani
- Leader of the House: Kasu Brahmananda Reddy; P. V. Narasimha Rao; Jalagam Vengal Rao; Marri Chenna Reddy; T. Anjaiah; Bhavanam Venkatarami Reddy; Kotla Vijaya Bhaskara Reddy; N. T. Rama Rao; Nadendla Bhaskara Rao
- Constituency: Andhra Pradesh

Personal details
- Born: 4 July 1933 Vemuru, Madras Presidency, British India (present-day Andhra Pradesh, India)
- Died: 4 December 2021 (aged 88) Hyderabad, Telangana, India
- Party: Indian National Congress (until 2011)
- Spouse: Konijeti Sivalakshmi (m. 1950)
- Children: 4

Konijeti Rosaiah (4 July 1933 – 4 December 2021) was an Indian politician who served as the 15th chief minister of Andhra Pradesh from 2009 to 2010. He also served as the Governor of Tamil Nadu from 2011 to 2016 and the Governor of Karnataka (additional charge) for two months. He was previously an MLC, MLA and MP from the Indian National Congress numerous times and handled many ministerial posts over his political career spanning over half a century.

While serving as Governor of Tamil Nadu, he was also given additional responsibility as Governor of Karnataka when Governor H. R. Bhardwaj's term ended on 28 June 2014, until Vajubhai Vala took over on 1 September 2014. After completing his five-year term as Governor of Tamil Nadu, he retired from active politics.

== Early life ==
Rosaiah was born into a Telugu-speaking, middle-class Hindu Komati family in Vemuru, Tenali mandal, present day Guntur district, in Andhra Pradesh. He graduated from Guntur Hindu College, Andhra University in Commerce. While he was studying in Guntur, he was elected as the student leader and thus entered into politics. He studied at Zilla Parishad High School.

== Political career ==
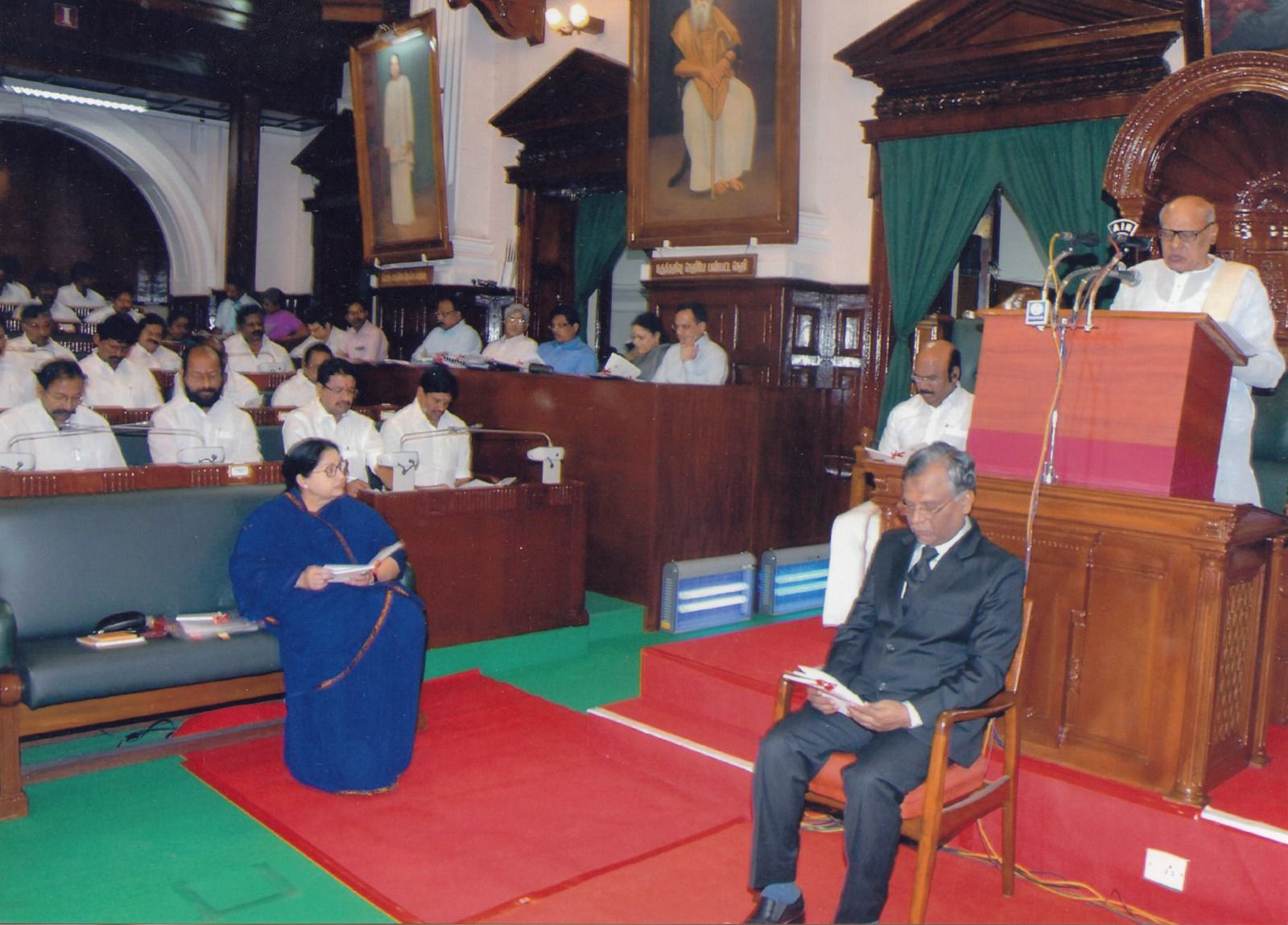
Rosaiah addressing the Tamil Nadu Assembly as the Governor

Rosaiah began as a political disciple of Swatantra Party leader and independence activist N.G. Ranga. He was elected as MLC in 1968, 1974, 1980 and 2009 and as an MLA in 1989 and 2004 from Chirala assembly constituency. In 1998, he was elected as MP from Narasaraopet. In the year 2011 he was sworn in as Governor of Tamil Nadu. During his long political career he interacted and worked closely with most of the Prime Ministers of India, including Jawaharlal Nehru.

=== Ministerial portfolios held ===
- AP State Minister for Transportation and Roads and Buildings under M. Chenna Reddy from 1978.
- AP State Minister for Transportation and Housing under T. Anjaiah from 1980.
- AP State Minister for Home under Kotla Vijaya Bhasker Reddy from 1982.
- AP State Minister for Finance, Transportation and Electricity under M. Chenna Reddy from 1989.
- AP State Minister for Finance, Medical & Health, Education and Electricity under Nedurumalli Janardhana Reddy from Dec 1990.
- AP State Minister for Finance, Medical & Health, Education and Electricity under Kotla Vijaya Bhaskara Reddy from Oct 1992.
- AP State Minister for Finance, Planning & Legislative Affairs under Y. S. Rajasekhara Reddy from April 2004.

=== As APCC President ===
Rosaiah was the President of the Andhra Pradesh Congress Committee (APCC) from 1994 to 1996.

=== As Finance Minister ===
Rosaiah presented the state budget 16 times, including 7 times in a row, a record in the country. He was a finance minister under Marri Chenna Reddy, Kotla Vijaya Bhaskara Reddy, Nedurumalli Janardhana Reddy and Y. S. Rajashekhara Reddy. As Finance Minister in Chenna Reddy's cabinet, he ensured teachers received retirement benefits. Rosaiah was well known for adhering to strict fiscal management principles and effective mobilization and utilization of government funds. His contribution to the state as its longest serving finance minister is well recognized.

=== As Chief Minister ===
Rosaiah took over as the Chief Minister after the death of Y. S. Rajashekhara Reddy. In his tenure, Konijeti strived to bring political stability to the state and continue all the welfare programs planned and initiated by his predecessor. He is often credited with the effective management of the flood situation during October 2009, the law and order situation with respect to the Telangana agitation which started in December 2010, effective budgetary management, streamlining of the delivery systems of welfare programs etc. He submitted his resignation as Chief Minister to the Governor of Andhra Pradesh, ESL Narasimhan on 24 November 2010 citing health reasons.

=== Political History ===
As per the Information submitted to Parliament Office, as Member of Parliament of 12th Lok Sabha the following positions were held by him:

1968-85 Member, Andhra Pradesh Legislative Council

1979-83 Minister, Roads and Buildings, Housing, Transport and Home, Andhra Pradesh

1989-94 Member, Andhra Pradesh Legislative Assembly and Minister, Finance and Transport, Andhra Pradesh

1992-93 Leader of House, Andhra Pradesh Legislative Assembly

1998 Elected to 12th Lok Sabha

1998-99 Member, Committee on Industry and Member, Library Committee and Member, Consultative Committee, Ministry of Information and Broadcasting

He retired from active politics in August 2016, after completion of his term as Governor of Tamil Nadu. His political career lasted around 60 years.

== Honours ==
Andhra University conferred Rosaiah with an honorary doctorate in 2007.

== Personal life ==
He was married on 4 June 1950 to Smt Sivalakshmi. He has 3 sons and 1 daughter. His sons are K S Subba Rao and K S N Murthy and daughter is P Rama Devi. His socio-cultural activities included helping the under-privileged. He was also a good orator. He was also member of the spices board in the year 1998. His professions include agriculturist, trader and industrialist.

Rosaiah died on 4 December 2021 at the age of 88 in Hyderabad, Telangana after a brief illness. The Government of Andhra Pradesh and the Government of Telangana observed a three-day state mourning as a mark of respect to him. He was cremated with full state honours at his farmhouse in Kompally on 5 December 2021.

K. Rosaiah's statue was unveiled on the occasion of his 92nd birth anniversary at Lakdi ka pul, Hyderabad by All India Congress Committee (AICC) president Mallikarjun Kharge along with Chief Minister A. Revanth Reddy on 4 July 2025.

== See also ==
- List of chief ministers of Andhra Pradesh
- List of governors of Tamil Nadu
