= Krishikar Lok Party =

Political party in the Hyderabad State, India

- Abbreviation: KLP
- Leader: Acharya N. G. Ranga
- Founder: Acharya N. G. Ranga
- Founded: April 1951
- Dissolved: June 1959
- Merged into: Indian National Congress
- Headquarters: Hyderabad, India
- Ideology: Peasant politics
- Lok Sabha (1951): 1
- Madras Legislative Assembly (1952): 15

Krishikar Lok Party (Peasants People's Party) was a political party in the Hyderabad State, India, which existed from April 1951 to June 1959. The KLP was formed when Acharya N. G. Ranga separated from the Hyderabad State Praja Party.

KLP contested 1952 Madras Legislative Assembly election and won 15 seats. In 1959, N. G. Ranga, along with C. Rajagopalachari, broke away from the Congress party and established the Swatantra Party due to their dissatisfaction with Nehru's increasingly socialist policies, including the implementation of land reforms and cooperative farming processes. Ranga assumed the role of its first president of the Swatantra Party.

== History ==
The Krishikar Lok Party (KLP) was founded by N.G. Ranga, who left the Congress after losing the 1951 election for Congress president. Dissatisfied, Ranga, along with Tanguturi Prakasam Panthulu, formed the Praja Party and attended a Kisan Mazdoor Praja Party meeting in Patna. During the formation of a sub-committee, Prakasam's name was included, but Ranga's followers' request to include his name was ignored. Dissatisfied, Ranga left the Congress and established the KLP with support from followers in Gujarat, Rajasthan and Andhra Pradesh.

Key members of the party like Kandula Obul Reddy, Peddireddy Timmareddy, Gouthu Latchanna, Bharati Devi, V.V. Ramana, N.V. Naidu, Chegireddi Bali Reddi and Paturi Rajagopala Naidu were instrumental in implementing the party's program.

=== 1951 by-election ===
The State convention of the party took place in Tenali, Andhra Pradesh in 1951, drawing a large crowd. The party decided to participate in the Duggirala by-election, putting forward Ancha Venkateswarlu as its candidate with high expectations. Venkateswarlu was defeated by Congress candidate, Meduri Nageswara Rao.

=== 1951 Lok Sabha elections ===
KLP contested the 1951 Lok Sabha elections, winning one seat for the party from the Bharatpur Sawaimadhopur constituency.

=== 1952 General election ===
In the 1952 General Elections, the party fielded candidates, including N.G. Ranga and his wife Bharati Devi, in key constituencies but only managed to win 19 seats. None of the seats were secured in Krishna district and Guntur district, where the party was popular. Neerukunda Rama Rao won a seat in East Godavari district due to his personal reputation. The remaining 18 seats came from Srikakulam and Visakhapatnam in one corner of the state and Chittoor from another corner. Timma Reddy and Gouthu Latchanna were important elected candidates. The Krishikar Lok Party played an important role in the Madras State Legislative Assembly by supporting C. Rajagopalachari in forming the ministry.

=== 1955 Andhra State Legislative Assembly election ===
In the 1955 Andhra State Legislative Assembly election, an alliance was formed among Indian National Congress, Praja Party and KLP, resulting in KLP winning 22 seats. Following the election, upon Jawaharlal Nehru's request, Ranga merged KLP with the Congress party. He was elected to the Congress in the 1957 general election from the Tenali Lok Sabha constituency.

== Notable figures ==
- N. G. Ranga
- Daggubati Raghavaiah Chowdary
- Yadlapati Venkata Rao
- Gouthu Latchanna
- Chowdary Satyanarayana
- Villuri Venkataramana
- N. V. Rama Rao
- Kandula Obul Reddy
- Paturi Rajagopala Naidu
- Bharati Devi Ranga
