= Nidubrolu railway station =

Railway station in Andhra Pradesh, India

Nidubrolu

General information
- Location: Railway Station Road, Nidubrolu, Guntur district, Andhra Pradesh; India
- Coordinates: 16.110°N 80.4943°E
- System: Indian Railways station
- Operator: Indian Railways
- Line: Tenali–Gudur section
- Platforms: 5
- Tracks: 6

Construction
- Structure type: Standard (On ground)
- Accessible: Disabled access

Other information
- Status: Active
- Station code: NDO
- Zone(s): South Central Railway zone
- Division(s): Vijayawada

Services
Preceding station	Indian Railways	Following station
Modukuru towards ?	Tenali–Gudur section	Machavaram towards ?
Location
- Location within Andhra Pradesh Location within India
- Interactive map

Nidubrolu railway station (station code:NDO) is an Indian Railways station in Ponnur of Andhra Pradesh. It lies on the Tenali–Gudur section of Indian Railways and is administered under Vijayawada railway division of South Coast Railway zone.

== Classification ==
In terms of earnings and outward passengers handled, Nidubrolu is categorized as a Non-Suburban Grade-5 (NSG-5) railway station. Based on the re–categorization of Indian Railway stations for the period of 2017–18 and 2022–23, an NSG–5 category station earns between ₹1–₹10 crore and handles 1–2 million passengers.

== Development ==
In 2017 SCR installed Automatic Ticket Vending Machines (ATVM)s in this station.
