= Madduluri Malakondaiah Yadav =

Indian politician (born 1962)

Member of the Andhra Pradesh Legislative Assembly
- Incumbent
- Assumed office 2024
- Preceded by: Karanam Balaram Krishna Murthy
- Constituency: Chirala

Personal details
- Born: 1962 (age 63–64)
- Party: Telugu Desam Party

Madduluri Malakondaiah Yadav (born 1962) is an Indian politician from Andhra Pradesh. He is an MLA from Chirala Assembly constituency, which is in Bapatla district. He represents Telugu Desam Party. He won the 2024 Andhra Pradesh Legislative Assembly election where TDP had an alliance with BJP and Jana Sena Party.

== Early life and education ==
Yadav is from Chirala. His father Pedda Kondaiah was a farmer. He completed his schooling in 1978 and did his intermediate in 1981. Later, he completed his graduation in commerce through distance education.

== Political career ==
Yadav won the 2024 Andhra Pradesh Legislative Assembly election from Chirala Assembly constituency representing Telugu Desam Party. He polled 72,700 votes and defeated Karanam Venkatesh of YSR Congress Party by a margin of 20,984 votes. Earlier in 2009, he lost the Ongole Lok Sabha constituency seat representing Telugu Desam Party in the 2009 Indian general election in Andhra Pradesh to Magunta Sreenivasulu Reddy of Indian National Congress by a margin of 78,523 votes.
