= State Highway 48 (Andhra Pradesh) =

Road in Andhra Pradesh, India

State Highway 48

Major junctions
- West end: Guntur
- East end: Chirala

Location
- Country: India
- States: Andhra Pradesh
- Primary destinations: Guntur, Ponnur, Bapatla, Chirala

Highway system
- Roads in India; Expressways; National; State; Asian

State Highway 48 is a state highway in the Indian state of Andhra Pradesh It is also referred as Guntur-Bapatla-Chirala Road.

== Route ==
It starts at Guntur and passes through Ponnur, Bapatla and ends at Chirala.

== See also ==
- List of state highways in Andhra Pradesh
