= N. V. Rama Rao =

Indian politician

Neerukonda Venkata Rama Rao (died 4 May 1955) was an Indian politician.

Rao participated in the salt satyagraha at the age of 16. He was an active member of the Indian National Congress, but broke with the party in 1951 and joined the Krishikar Lok Party. Rao won one of the two Burugupudi seats in the 1955 Andhra State Legislative Assembly election, obtaining 54% of the votes. When the KLP merged with the Congress Party, Rao again became a Congress member.

On 28 March 1955 he sworn in as Minister of Agriculture and Forestsin the Andhra State cabinet of B. Gopala Reddy. He was unable to attend the first session of the Andhra State Legislative Assembly, as he had fallen ill during a visit to Madras. He died from heart problems at Madras General Hospital on 4 May 1955, at the age of 41. Following his death, a by-election was held in which Congress candidate Neerukonda Venkatarathnam was elected unopposed.
