= Pragada Kotaiah =

Indian politician (1915–1995)

- Pragada Kotaiah
- Born: Pragada Kotaiah; 26 July 1915; Nidubrolu, Guntur district, Andhra Pradesh, British India
- Died: 26 November 1995 (aged 80)
- Spouse: Indira Devi
- Parent(s): Kotamma; Veerabhadrudu

Pragada Kotaiah (26 July 1915 – 26 November 1995) was an Indian freedom fighter and politician. He served as a Member of Parliament in the upper house from 1990 to 1995. He was the leader of the Handloom movement in India.

== Early life and education ==
Pragada Kotaiah was born in 1915 in a Padmasali family in Nidubrolu of Guntur district, Andhra Pradesh. He completed his schooling at Ponnur. He completed his textile technology from Madras Textiles Institute.

Kotaiah finished S.S.L.C. in the year 1931, he came out with first class in Supervisor's Course in Spinning, Handloom, Weaving, Dyeing and Printing in the Textile institute at Madras. Kotaiah also completed certificate course in Chemistry as applied to Cotton Textile Industry City and Guilds of London Institute in first Class.

== Career ==
Kotaiah served as a Member of the Legislative Assembly from 1952 to 1962, representing the composite Madras State, Andhra State, and later, Andhra Pradesh. He was re-elected to the Andhra Pradesh Assembly from 1967 to 1972 and subsequently served on the Andhra Pradesh Legislative Council from 1974 to 1980. He served on various legislative subcommittees and was a member of the A.P. State Drainage Board and the District Irrigation Committee.

Kotaiah was a member of the Andhra Pradesh Congress Committee from 1948 to 1974. Additionally, he served on its working committee from 1955 to 1956 and held the position of general secretary from 1974 to 1978.

=== Work ===
Kotaiah served as the General Secretary of the State Handloom Weavers Congress in Madras and Andhra since 1942. He held the position of General Secretary of the All India Handloom Weavers Congress, which was established in Nagpur in 1945. Kotaiah led Satyagraha Movements, enduring a 75-day protest in Madras and a subsequent 20-day protest in Andhra, for which he faced arrests and court sentences.

Pragada Kotaiah founded the Romperu Development Committee, through which approximately 16,000 acres of land from the Romperu drain were distributed to the impoverished in 1954. That was the starting point and set up example for the distribution of Government lands in the state.

Kotaiah was responsible for provision of irrigation facilities in Romperu lands in Chirala and for starting of Thotavaripalem Lift Irrigation Schema and helped economic uplift of thousands of poor peasants in several villages on the eastern side of Kunderu drain in Chirala Taluq.

He also worked as an inspector of cooperative societies, during which he studied the challenges faced by weavers and the reasons behind the failure of cooperatives. Kotaiah organized handloom weavers' conferences throughout the State, urging them to establish more cooperative societies.

=== Development of Drainage Facilities ===
He fought for provision of drainage facilities to the lands irrigated in Krishna Western Delta in 1964, when irrigated lands in Chirala and Bapatla areas were inundated in the Floods. With the result Mitra Committee was constituted. The report was kept in cold storage; Again unprecedented floods occurred in May 1969 in Chirala Area, washing away into the sea more than 2,000 people working in the fields. When Dr. K. L. Rao the then Union Irrigation Minister visited Chirala at that time, Kotaiah pleaded for implementation of the recommendations of the Mitra Committee and also got announced on the spot, a loan of Rs. 30 million by the Centre to the State Government to take up the Drainage Facilities. The Andhra Pradesh State Drainage Cess Act was enacted; Andhra Pradesh State Drainage Board was formed; took up the schemes for improvement of Drainage Facilities in both Krishna and Godavari Deltas.

=== Other Activities ===
- Member of the Governing Body of the then V.R.S. College, Chirala (presently V.R.S. & Y.R.N. College), assisted in securing over 60 acres land for it
- Member of the Senate of Andhra University from the local Boards constituency, Guntur for one term.
- Responsible for erection of a life size bronze statue of Andhra Ratna Duggirala Gopalakrishnaiah at Chirala
- Responsible for starting a Junior college at Vetapalem under the management of Bandla Venkateswara Rao.
- Founded the S.USI.T.I., at Vetapalem with financial assistance of the family members and relatives of Late Ummiti Sivaiah.
- Founded Andhra Kesari Prakasam Junior College at Chirala, forming the Andhra Kesari Prakasam Educational Society with the assistance of friends.

== Academic Institutions ==
In 1992, the Shri Pragada Kotaiah Memorial Indian Institute of Handloom Technology was established in memory of Pragada Kotaiah. This institute is one of eight institutions in India overseen by the Development Commissioner for Handlooms, New Delhi, under the Ministry of Textiles, Government of India.

== Positions held ==
| Year | Position |
|---|---|
| 1948–1974 | Member of the Andhra Pradesh Congress Committee |
| 1949 | Member of the Handloom Standing Committee of the All India Cottage Industries Board |
| 1950 | Member of the Special Committee appointed by Government for recommending spheres of production of Textiles exclusively for Handlooms. |
| 1952–1962 | Member of the Legislative Assembly |
| 1955–1956 | Member of Andhra Pradesh Congress Working Committee |
| 1959 | Organized Service Co-operatives in Andhra for Handloom Weavers, which served as background to the present AndhraPradesh State Handloom Weavers Co-operative Society Ltd., (APCO); Founder Chairman of the Chirala Coop. Spinning Mills, (Whose Foundation stone was laid by Prime Minister Pandit Jawaharlal Nehru) |
| 1962–1965 | Vice-Chairman of the All India Co-operative Spinning Mills Federation at Bombay |
| 1967–1972 | Member of Andhra Pradesh Assembly |
| 1973–1975 | Chairman of the National Federation of the Industrial Co-operatives Ltd., New Delhi. |
| 1974–1980 | Member of the Andhra Pradesh Legislative Council |
| 1974–1978 | General Secretary of Andhra Pradesh Congress Committee |
| 1975 | Member of the Andhra Pradesh State Committee for Fixing minimum Wages and for suggesting measures for the development of the Handloom Industry in the State |
| 1976–1978 | Member of the All India Hand-Loom Board |
| 1990–1995 | Member of Parliament Rajya Sabha |
