= Diguvamagham =

Coordinates: 13.272°N 78.969°E

- Village
- Interactive map of Diguvamagham
- Location in Andhra Pradesh, India
- Country: India
- State: Andhra Pradesh
- District: Chittoor

Languages
  - Official: Telugu
- Time zone: UTC+5:30 (IST)

Diguva-magham is a village in Chittoor district of the Indian state of Andhra Pradesh. It is located in Thavanampalle mandal. Many prominent industrialists, politicians, and entrepreneurs such as Aruna Kumari Galla, Galla Jayadev, and W Raja Naidu hail from Diguva-magham.

== Notable residents ==
- Galla Aruna Kumari
- Galla Jayadev
