= Amanchi Krishna Mohan =

Indian politician

Member of Legislative Assembly Andhra Pradesh
- In office 2009 - 2019
- Preceded by: Konijeti Rosaiah
- Succeeded by: Karanam Balaram Krishna Murthy
- Constituency: Chirala

Personal details
- Born: Pandillapalli, Prakasam District, Andhra Pradesh
- Party: None
- Other political affiliations: Indian National Congress (2000–2014,2024– present); Telugu Desam Party (2015–2019); YSR Congress Party (2019–2023)
- Website: http://www.amanchikrishnamohan.com/

Amanchi Krishna Mohan was ex Member of the Legislative Assembly (MLA) of Chirala Constituency, Andhra Pradesh.

== Personal life ==
Amanchi Krishna Mohan was born in 1975 in the Pandillapalli Village of the Praksam, Andhra Pradesh. He received his graduation as a B.Sc. from ASN College, Tenali.

== Political life ==
He started his political career as an Indian National Congress Member and was elected as the ZPTC member in 2000 from Vetapalem Mandal and in 2009 he was elected as MLA for Chirala Constituency and in the 2014 elections won as an independent member for Chirala, then after the elections he merged his party with Telugu Desam party.

He quit Telugu Desam Party in February 2019 and joined YSR Congress Party.

2000	ZPTC Member	Vetapalem Mandal
2006	MPP	Vetapalem Mandal
2009	MLA	Chirala
2014	MLA	Chirala
