= Galla Jayadev =

Indian businessman and politician

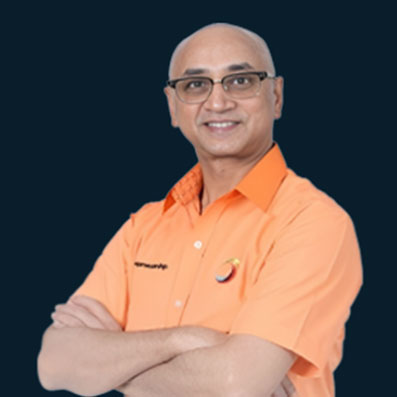

Member of Parliament, Lok Sabha
- In office 16 May 2014 – 28 January 2024
- Preceded by: Rayapati Sambasiva Rao
- Succeeded by: Chandra Sekhar Pemmasani
- Constituency: Guntur

Personal details
- Born: 24 March 1966 (age 60) Diguvamagham, Andhra Pradesh, India
- Party: Telugu Desam Party
- Spouse: Padmavathi (m. 1991)
- Relations: List: Galla Ramachandra Naidu (father); Galla Aruna Kumari (mother); Paturi Rajagopala Naidu (grandfather); Krishna (father-in-law); Ramesh Babu (brother-in-law); Mahesh Babu (brother-in-law); Manjula Swaroop (sister-in-law)
- Education: University of Illinois at Urbana–Champaign

Galla Jayadev (born 24 March 1966) is an Indian industrialist and former politician. He is the managing director of the Amara Raja Group. Galla Jayadev represented the Guntur constituency in the Lok Sabha as a member of the Telugu Desam Party (TDP) during the 16th Lok Sabha (2014–2019) and 17th Lok Sabha (2019–2024) of India. He served as the TDP Parliamentary Party Leader.

== Early and personal life ==
Galla Jayadev was born in Diguvamagham, Andhra Pradesh to Ramachandra Naidu and Aruna Kumari. His father is an industrialist who founded the Amara Raja Group. His mother Galla Aruna Kumari is a former MLA from Chandragiri constituency and was a minister in the Andhra Pradesh state government for several years. Galla Jayadev, has 1 Elder Sister : Dr. Gourineni Ramadevi. His grandfather Paturi Rajagopala Naidu was a freedom fighter, a close associate of Acharya N G Ranga and a former Indian parliamentarian.

Along with his parents, Jayadev moved to the USA, where he lived for around 22 years. He studied politics and economics at the University of Illinois Urbana-Champaign. He was a part of the Lambda Chi Alpha fraternity while there.

Jay married Padmavathi Ghattamaneni, daughter of prominent Indian actor Krishna Ghattamaneni on 26 June 1991.

One of the wealthiest politicians in India, Galla declared assets of ₹683 crore (US$71 million) in the 2014 general elections.

== Career ==
After his graduation, Jay worked as an international sales executive at GNB Battery Technologies in USA. On his return from the United States in 1992, he took up the task of setting up the sales and service network for the industrial battery division of Amara Raja. In 1992 along with his father Ramachandra Naidu Galla started looking at automotive batteries as viable business and tied up with Johnson Controls the US-based giant and gave then 26% stake in their company Amara Raja to start Amara Raja Batteries Limited (ARBL). ARBL is one of the leading manufacturers of advanced lead acid batteries in India. He took over as the managing director of Amara Raja Batteries in 2003 from his father. He has been trying to get into the steps of his mother by entering into politics. He contested 16th Lok Sabha election from the Guntur Constituency in Andhra Pradesh and won with a big margin.

On 28 January 2024, he announced a break from full time politics.

== In parliament ==
Jayadev spoke on a number of different issues of public interest in the Parliament of India. His description and analysis on the subject of tolerance in India was appreciated by general public.

He spoke in Loksabha on 7 February 2018, regarding the Budget allocations to Andhra Pradesh in Union Budget 2018. Also he made comment that Baahubali movie collections are more than the funds allocated to Andhra Pradesh. Accusing the NDA government of not doing anything to fulfill the promises made at the time of bifurcation of the state, Mr Galla wanted to know what the government did in the last four years.

Jayadev displayed the much needed political aggression in his 16-minute speech in Lok Sabha on the raw deal meted out to Andhra Pradesh in the Union Budget. Pointing out the enormous delay and apathy displayed by the Centre in fulfilling its obligations under AP Bifurcation Act, Jayadev demanded of Union Finance Minister Arun Jaitley and Prime Minister Narendra Modi an explanation to the people of AP. Galla articulated the deep sense of betrayal felt by the people of the state at the inexplicable cold attitude of the Centre. He cautioned the Centre against the prolonged neglect of the State and its requirements at its own peril. Excerpts from his emotional speech that won great appreciation for him from all the quarters: Sir, I do understand about trust an essential requirement for any partnership to continue. I also think that I can safely say that India has not seen her last days of coalition governments. What message do you want to send to your allies and potential allies mr. Prime Minister. Your allies are feeling neglected, betrayed and humiliated as are the five core people of Andhra Pradesh. We demand an explanation. In the budget there’s no mention of Amaravati, Polavaram, Railway zone, deficit budget, special package, not to mention the other commitments made in the AP Reorganization Act and the assurances made on the floor of the Raja Sabha by then Prime Minister Manmohan Singh ji, without which this bill would not have been passed and therefore should be considered sacrosanct.

Performance in the Lok Sabha, 2014–2024

MP performance parameters (2014–2024)	Jayadev Galla
Attendance in parliament	90%, against state average 74%
Questions raised	432, against state average 227
Number of cases	NONE
Committee membership	6
Debates participated	105, against state average 35
Score on committee attendance	9
Private Member Bills	6, against state average 0.8
Lok Sabha performance score	8.5 out of 10
Voter satisfaction score	8.5 out of 10

== Charitable work ==
In 2014, Jayadev Galla donated ₹1 crore from his personal funds for relief and rehabilitation efforts in the cyclone-affected north coastal districts of Andhra Pradesh. In 2017, he allocated ₹2 crore from his Members of Parliament Local Area Development Scheme (MPLADS) funds to improve and develop the Government General Hospital in Guntur.
