= Ponnur Municipality =

- పొన్నూరు పురపాలక సంస్థ
- Formation: 1964
- Merger of: Municipal Corporation
- Type: Governmental organization
- Legal status: Local government
- Headquarters: Ponnur
- Location: Ponnur, Guntur district, Andhra Pradesh, India
- Official language: Telugu
- Chairperson: Sajja Hemalatha
- Commissioner: M.Ramesh Babu
- Main organ: Committee
- Website: ponnurmunicipality.com/about-ponnur/

Ponnur Municipality is the local self government in Ponnur, a town in the Indian state of Andhra Pradesh. It is classified as a Grade–II municipality.

As the 2011 census of India, the municipality had a population of 59,913, with 16,138 households.

== History ==
The municipality was constituted in the year 1964 as Grade–III and then got upgraded in the year 1984 as a Grade–II municipality.

== Administration ==
The jurisdictional area of the municipality is spread over an area of 25.64 km^{2} (9.90 sq mi) with 31 municipal and 16 revenue wards. The Elected Wing of the municipality consists of a municipal council, which has elected members and is headed by a Chairperson. Whereas, the Executive Wing is headed by a municipal commissioner. The present chairperson of the municipality is Sajja Hemalatha and the present commissioner is M.Ramesh Babu.

As per the survey conducted in 2014, there exists 60,600 households. In 2014–15, the total income generated by the municipality was ₹ 8.8695 crore and the expenditure spent was ₹ 7.4132 crore.

== Civic works and services ==
The municipality supplies drinking and irrigation water to the town from the Kommamuru, Poondla and Alwala channels of Krishna Western Delta system by means of borewells, public taps and water treatment plants. A total of 9 MLD (million liters per day) of drinking water is supplied every day. There are 38.35 km (23.83 mi) of cement concrete roads and 160.80 km (99.92 mi) of drains and 71.05 km (44.15 mi) of storm water drains.

The other infrastructure covers street lights, markets, and burial grounds, and recreational centers like, parks, playgrounds, auditoriums, functional halls and worship centers like temples, mosques and churches. There are both government and private educational institutions from primary to high schools including junior colleges. For public health, the municipality has a Government hospital and many other government and private nursing homes.

== See also ==
- List of municipalities in Andhra Pradesh
