= Chimata Sambu =

Indian politician

Member of Parliament, Lok Sabha
- In office 1984–1989
- Preceded by: P. Ankineedu Prasada Rao
- Succeeded by: Salagala Benjamin
- Constituency: Bapatla

Personal details
- Born: July 7, 1953 (age 72) Chirala Village, Prakasam district, Andhra Pradesh
- Party: Telugu Desam Party
- Spouse: Malleswari

Chimata Sambu is an Indian politician. He was a Member of Parliament, representing Bapatla in the Lok Sabha, the lower house of India's Parliament, as a member of the Telugu Desam Party.
