= Amara Raja Group =

Indian multinational conglomerate company private limited

- Type: Private
- Industry: Conglomerate
- Founded: 1985; 41 years ago
- Founder: Ramachandra Naidu Galla
- Headquarters: Tirupati, Andhra Pradesh, India
- Area served: Worldwide
- Key people: Ramachandra Naidu Galla (founder chairman); Galla Jayadev (co-founder, chairman & managing director)
- Products: Automotive battery; battery chargers; electronics; industrial batteries; digital inverters; infrastructure; power; processed food; trickle chargers; UPS; Medical Diagnostic Equipment
- Revenue: ▲₹17,000 crore (US$1.8 billion) (2024)
- Number of employees: 15850 (2023)
- Subsidiaries: Amara Raja Energy & Mobility; Amara Raja Electronics; Amara Raja Power Systems; Amara Raja Design Alpha; Amara Raja Infra; Galla Foods; Mangal Industries; Amara Raja Media; Log 9 Materials (15.4%)
- Website: www.amararaja.com

Amara Raja Group is an Indian multinational conglomerate, headquartered in Tirupati. The group has a presence in the automotive battery business, packaged foods and beverages, electronics products manufacturing, infrastructure sector, power system production and fabrication of sheet metal products and fasteners. The Amara Raja Group is known for its automotive battery brand Amaron.

Amara Raja Group employs a workforce of more than 15,216 employees. Amara Raja Batteries was named on Asia's 'Best Under A Billion' 2010 list of companies compiled by Forbes magazine.

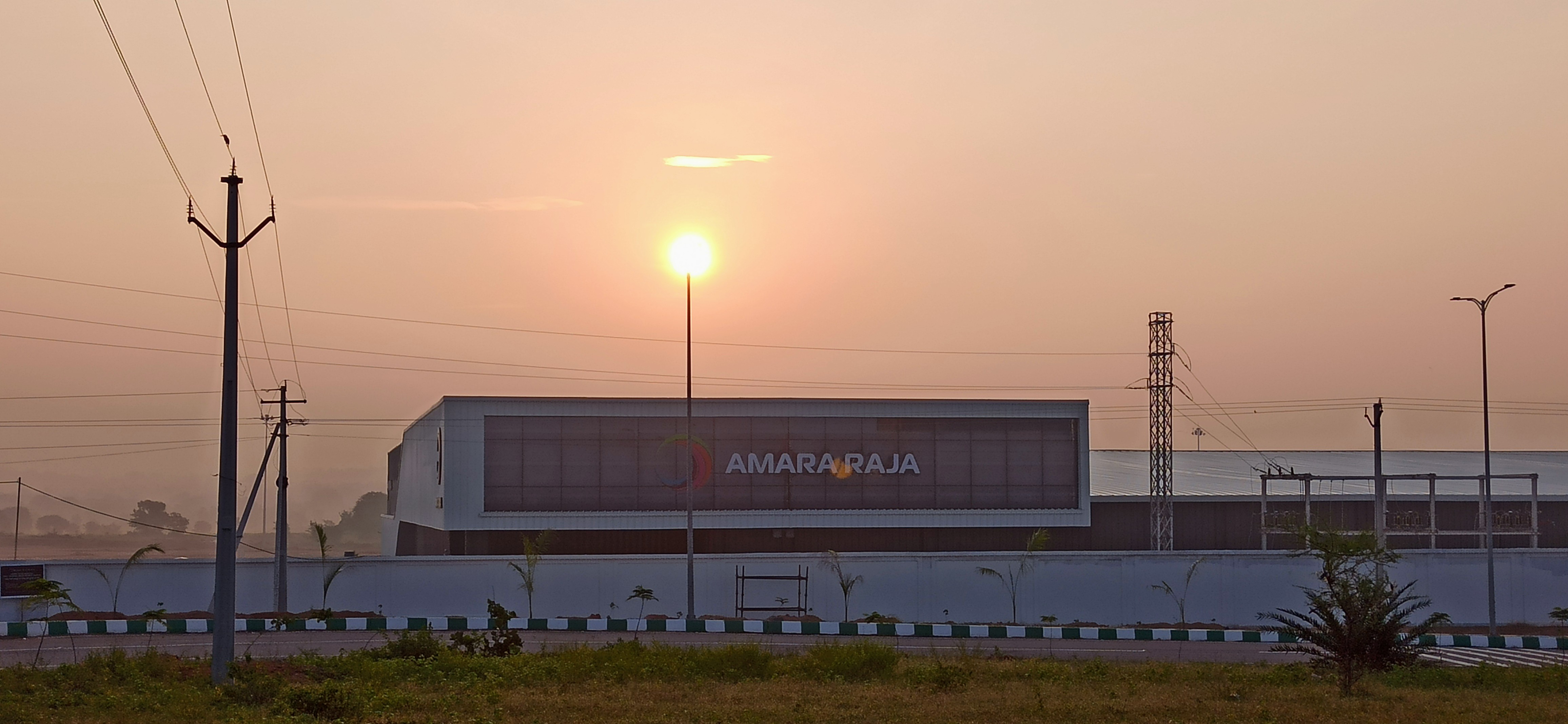
Amararaja giga factory at Divitipally Mahabubnagar Telangana

== History ==
A first generation entrepreneur, Ramachandra Naidu Galla, founded the Amara Raja Group of companies in 1985 and became the first CEO. The automotive batteries business unit commenced operations in 2001 with a joint technology venture with Johnson Controls, the world's largest manufacturer of automotive batteries. It pioneered the introduction of zero maintenance technology in India's automotive battery segment, the key differentiator in the Indian electric storage market.

The group was named after Jaydev's grandparents Amaravati and Rajagopal Naidu.

=== Timeline ===
- 1985 Power systems Ltd founded
- 1989 Industrial battery division (IBD) ISBU
- 1992 Designed and Implemented battery manufacturing facility in India
- 1997 Received ISO 9001 Certification & signed JV with Johnson Controls
- 1998 Automotive battery division (ABD) ASBU
- 1999 Received QS9000 Certification
- 2008 Small battery division (SBD) Two wheeler battery plant ASBU
- 2012 MVRLA (ISBU) UPS Battery
- 2013 ARGC Amararaja Growth Corridor
- 2014 Automotive Battery division (ABD-2)
- 2015 Tubular battery division (TBD)
- 2019 Bipolar battery division
- 2021 Invested in Log 9 Materials, a Li-battery startup for LTO and LFP battery technology
- 2023 Acquired Significant Stake in Design Alpha
- 2024 Signed a licensing deal with China's Gotion for lithium-ion cell manufacturing

== Johnson Controls Inc. ==
- Amara Raja Batteries of India signed a joint venture with Johnson Controls Inc. in December 1997 to manufacture Amaron automotive batteries in India.
- The group terminated their partnership with Johnson Controls on 1 April 2019.

== Amara Raja giga corridor ==
Amara Raja's first giga factory is a lithium-ion cell and battery pack manufacturing facility in Mahbubnagar, Telangana. The factory will have an initial capacity of 16 GWh for lithium cells and 5 GWh for battery packs.

Amara Raja signed a licensing deal with China's Gotion for lithium battery cell manufacturing in June 2024.

== Amara Raja Group of companies ==
- Amara Raja Design Alpha Pvt Ltd
- Amara Raja Electronics Ltd
- Amara Raja Energy & Mobility
- Amara Raja Infra (P) Ltd
- Amara Raja Media and Entertainment Pvt Ltd
- Galla Foods Pvt Ltd
- Mangal Industries Ltd

== Brands ==
- Amaron
- Amaron Quanta
- Galla
- PowerZone
- Silver Lining Storage Solutions

== Awards ==
Amara Raja Batteries Limited won the Innovative Product/Service (GPIPSA) 2020 award in Engineering sector for the innovation Motor Cycle Valve Regulated Lead Acid Battery punched grid with state of art manufacturing facility.

== See also ==
- Exide Industries
- V-Guard Industries
