= Paturi Rajagopala Naidu =

Indian freedom fighter, parliamentarian and kisan (farmer) leader

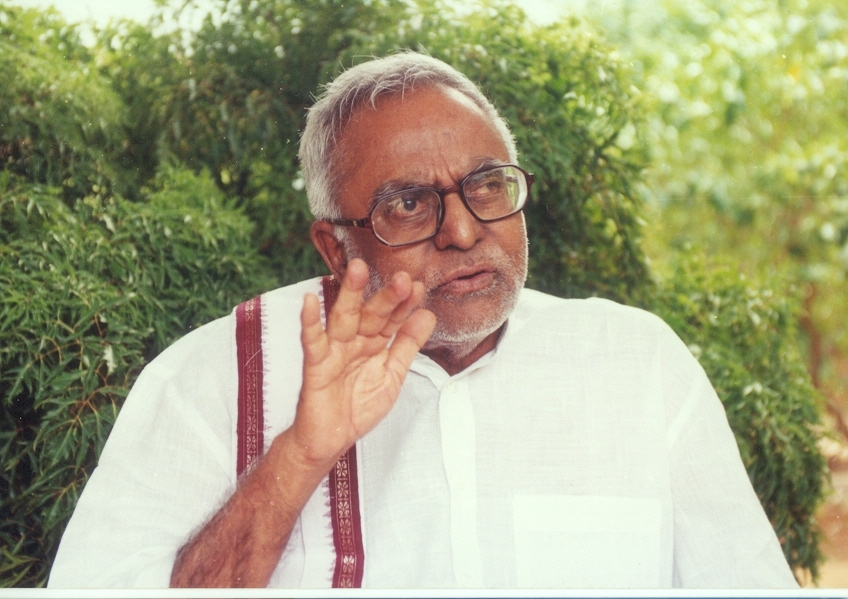

Personal details
- Born: 5 April 1920 Diguvamagham, Chittoor district, Andhra Pradesh
- Died: 21 October 1997 (aged 77)
- Children: Galla Aruna Kumari

Paturi Rajagopala Naidu, better known as Rajanna (5 April 1920 – 21 October 1997), was an Indian freedom fighter, parliamentarian, and kisan (farmer) leader. He was the political guru of Nara Chandrababu Naidu. He was an exponent of the peasant philosophy, and considered the father of the Indian Peasant Movement after Swami Sahajanand Saraswati.

== Early life ==
Rajagopala Naidu was born on 5 April 1920 at Diguvamagham to Smt. Paturi Lakshmamma and Shri. Paturi Srinivasulu Naidu. His primary education was at Diguvamagham Aided School, Secondary Education at District Board High School, Chittoor, and his higher education was at Government College, Anantapur, and was completed in 1942.

Shri. Chennakrishnayya and Shri. K. Rama Naidu was his teacher at Diguvamagham. He stayed along with Shri. Bollineni Parthasarathy Naidu's family during his schooling days at Chittoor and at Shri. Konda Venkatappaiah's family in Anantapur.

He had an inclination towards politics from his college days and was inspired by a communist leader Shri. Tadipatri Rami Reddy. He discretely disseminated the "Akashavani" newspaper by riding a bicycle and used to go to college wearing a "Gandhian Cap" and started numerous daring developments against British principles by dislodging the railway tracks.

He returned to Diguvamagham holding a bachelor's degree in 1942 and engaged in social service in and around Diguvamagham village by starting many social organizations.

He has played a stage performance “ Annagari Koolodu” for which Shri. N.G.Ranga was the chief guest. From then on he was greatly inspired by Shri. N.G. Ranga and later become his follower and close associate.

He was married to Smt. Amaravathamma, daughter of Shri. Seenaiah Naidu, of Kondrajukalva village. After marriage, he started his career as a teacher at Sholingur and later at Uttara Brahmana Palli, Elementary School, Diguvamagham. After that, he worked at Oriental Publishing Company, Madras for a few days and also at their Chittoor branch.

His daughter, Aruna Kumari was born in 1945. His wife, Smt. Paturi Amaravathama died in 1947 and thereafter he remained a widower.

== Political career ==
Year	Elected As	Constituency	Party
1955	Member of Legislative Assembly	tavanampalle	Krishilok Party 1962 Member of Legislative Assembly Tavanampalle Swatantra Party
1973	Member of Legislative Council	Chittoor	
1977	Member of Parliament	Chittoor	Congress
1979	Member of Parliament	Chittoor	Congress

== Children ==
Rajagopala Naidu has one daughter, Galla Aruna Kumari.

== Family ==
- Dr. Ramachandra Naidu Galla- Son-in-law
- Dr. Ramadevi Gourineni- Granddaughter married to Dr. Prasad Gourineni
- Jayadev Galla - Grandson married to Padma Galla
- Harshavardhana Gourineni married to priyanka, Vikramaditya Gourineni married to Ankita - Great-grandchildren
- Ashok Galla, Siddharth Galla - Great-grandchildren

== Other Major Inspiring Activities ==
Year	Major Event
1946	Started Farmers Education at Sivagiri, starting of Literature clubs, manually written paper by name " Nagelu" and Library agitation
1947	1.Got associated with monks at Sivagiri Ashram 2.Has done lot of Social Activities untired lessly 3.Stage plays performed at Diguvamagham, in particular "Sarasisa" and so forth 4.Instrumental in permitting Harijans for Darshan at Tirumala 5.Land acquisition for High School at Aragonda
1953	1.Established, Chittoor District Kalaparishad and organised week long performances 2.Instrumental in setting-up Electricity Sub-Station at Aragonda 3.Established “Balananda” societies for children's
1955	1.Elected as Member of Legislative Assembly on Krishikarlok party 2.Participated in Ant-Toddy movement and was imprisoned at Rajahmundry jail
1956	1.District organiser for Bharath Sevak Samaj 2.Established School for Politics at Tiruttani 3.Instrumental in laying Thar Road between Aragonda – Chittoor 4.Provided help to set up sugar factory and Krishnaveni Junior school for ladies at Chittoor
1962	Instrumental in getting Shri. N.G.Ranga contesting from Chittoor and winning election as Member of Parliament from Chittoor
1963	Got his daughter Aruna Kumari married wedded to Shri. Rama Chandra Naidu. Galla
1964	Health concerns and stayed at the house of Justice P.A.Chowdary
1965	Instrumental in establishing high school at Santhapet, Chittoor and donated Rs. 25,000/-
1973	1.Visited United States of America 2.Elected as Member of Legislative Council, Andhra Pradesh.
1977	Elected as Member of Parliament from Chittoor on Congress ticket
1978	Nominated as Senate Member, S.V. University
1979	1.Elected for second term as Member of Parliament from Chittoor on Congress ticket 2.Instrumental in a. Developed “Thapovanam” at Chittoor b. Lifting controls on Jaggery c. Providing Bus Passes to students in state road transport corp d. Establishing Milk Dairy at Chittoor e. Sanction of Sericulture funds from central to state government
1980	Established RASS (Rayalaseema Seva Samithi)
1984	Governing President for “Vinaya Ashramam” at Kavuru-Guntur Dist, and played a key role for rejuvenation
1985	Got Treated for Diabetics and Kidney ailments at Vijaya Hospital, Chennai and was looking after “Vinaya Ashramam” activities
1997	Suffered hip injury while on a walk and got admitted to Apollo hospitals. Shri. Rajagopala Naidu died on 21 October

While he was alive there were no instances of any political, education, or cultural event being organised without his participation.

Shri. Rajagopala Naidu, strongly believed that a society's development greatly depends on the education of the people in that society. With the inspiration and his motivation, Smt. Aruna Kumari Galla and Dr. Ramachandra Naidu Galla, established a non-profit charitable association in 1969, Krishnadevaraya Educational and Cultural Association (KECA), to help deserving meritorious students. KECA till today has supported 1500 students with financial support of close to Rs. 2.25 crores.

== Author and Philosopher ==
He was an author, philosopher, novel playwright and has written: Sarasisa, Bagna Hruydayam, Porabatu, Ranaprathap, kalasajalalu, Tyaga Bhoomi, Bharatha Vijayam, Vennela velugulu, Chandragiri Durgam, Chatrapathi Sivaji, Daivopahatudu, Dara, Jejavva, Ramanujuni Prathigna, Gandikota, Matrumandiram, Madhulika, Tamasoma, Kurukshetre, Radeyudu, Bagyanagaram, Krishnavataram, Bhagavan Parasuram, Pridvivallabudu, Buddamsaranamgachhami, Netaji, translation of few Malayalaswamy writings. He has also written Mahabharath in English: “The Trial The Triumph”.
