= Galla Ramachandra Naidu =

Indian businessman

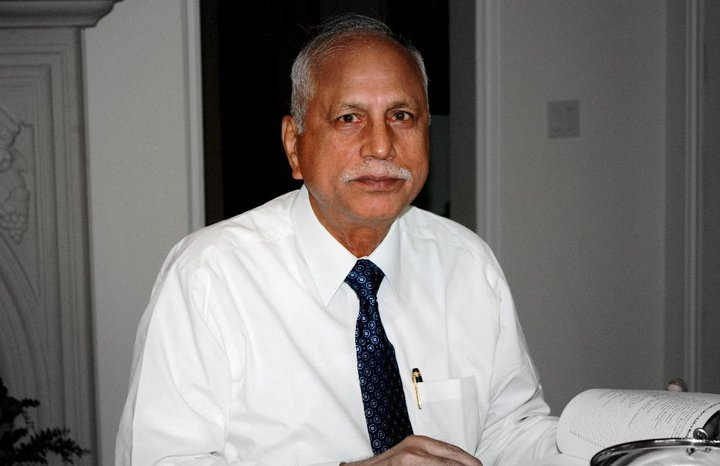
- Born: 1 June 1938 (age 88); Chittoor, Andhra Pradesh, INDIA
- Occupation: Industrialist
- Spouse: Aruna Kumari Galla
- Children: Ramadevi Gourineni; Jayadev Galla
- Website: www.amararaja.com

Galla Ramachandra Naidu (born 1 June 1938) is an Indian industrialist, the founder and former chairman of the Amara Raja Group of companies. He is married to Galla Aruna Kumari, an ex-minister in the Andhra Pradesh state government.

== Personal life ==
Galla was born on 1June 1938, to Galla Gangulu Naidu and Galla Mangamma in the village of Petamitta in Chittoor District, Andhra Pradesh, in south-eastern India. Galla Ramachandra Naidu is married to Galla Aruna Kumari, the daughter of Sri Paturi Rajagopala Naidu. He has two children Ramadevi and Galla Jayadev.

== Career ==
He did his bachelor's degree in Electrical Engineering at Jawaharlal Nehru Technological University, Anantapur, then took a master's degree from the University of Roorkee (Now IIT Roorkee), now in Uttarakhand and a second master's degree at Michigan State University. After leaving Michigan, he worked as an Electrical Engineer for Sargent & Lundy a consulting engineers firm engaged in the design of Fossil and nuclear Power projects. He returned to India in the 1980s, when he founded Amara Raja Group in Chittoor; the group spun off a number of subsidiaries, including Galla Foods and Mangal Precision Products. The group currently has an annual turnover of Rs. 6000 crore, approximately US$1000 million.

In 1998, he was awarded the Hyderabad Management Association's Entrepreneur of the Year award. In 2007 he was awarded an honorary doctorate from Sri Venkateswara University (Tirupati) and in 2008 an honorary doctorate from the Jawaharlal Nehru Technological University, Hyderabad.

== Charitable work ==
Galla has established a number of charitable trusts. They include the Krishna Devaraya Educational & Cultural Association, which provides educational scholarships to poor students in higher education, and the Rajanna Trust and Mangal Trust, which works on providing accessible water supplies to villages, and also help a lot of poor people.
