= Machavaram, Medak district =

Machavaram
- village
- Location in Telangana, India Machavaram (India)
- Coordinates: 18.03°N 78.27°E
- Country: India
- State: Telangana
- District: Medak
- Talukas: Machavaram, Medak

Population
  - Total: 5,000

Languages
  - Official: Telugu
- Time zone: UTC+5:30 (IST)
- PIN: 502109
- Telephone code: 08452226---
- Vehicle registration: TS
- Website: telangana.gov.in

Machavaram is a village in Medak district in the state of Telangana in India.
