= Machavaram, Palnadu district =

Machavaram
- Village
- Interactive map of Machavaram
- Location in Andhra Pradesh, India
- Coordinates: 16°34′13″N 79°52′00″E
- Country: India
- State: Andhra Pradesh
- District: Palnadu
- Mandal: Machavaram

Government
  - Type: Panchayati raj
  - Body: Machavaram gram panchayat

Area
  - Total: 1,416 ha (3,500 acres)

Population (2011)
  - Total: 10,388
  - Density: 733.6/km^{2} (1,900/sq mi)

Languages
  - Official: Telugu and English
- Time zone: UTC+5:30 (IST)
- PIN: 522xxx
- Area code: +91–8649
- Vehicle registration: AP

Machavaram is a village in Palnadu district of the Indian state of Andhra Pradesh. It is the headquarters of Machavaram mandal. The two major towns near this village are Dachepalle and Piduguralla.

== Geography ==
Machavaram is situated at 16.6°N 79.7333°E. It is spread over an area of 1,416 ha (3,500 acres).

== Governance ==
Machavaram gram panchayat is the local self-government of the village. It is divided into wards and each ward is represented by a ward member.

== Education ==
As per the school information report for the academic year 2018–19, the village has a total of 10 schools. These include 3 private and 7 Zilla Parishad/MPP schools.
