= Nidubrolu =

Nidubrolu is an area in Ponnur. Ponnur municipality of Tenali revenue division.

== Government and politics ==
Ponnur Municipality is a governmental body.

== Transport ==
Nidubrolu railway station is classified as a D–category station in the Vijayawada railway division of South Central Railway zone. There are frequent public bus services available from Tenali and Guntur, as all passenger train services from Tenali were extended to Guntur.

== Notable citizens ==
- N. G. Ranga - Gandhian and former MP
- Kondaveeti Venkatakavi - Telugu poet
