= N. G. Ranga =

Indian freedom fighter and parliamentarian (1900–1995)

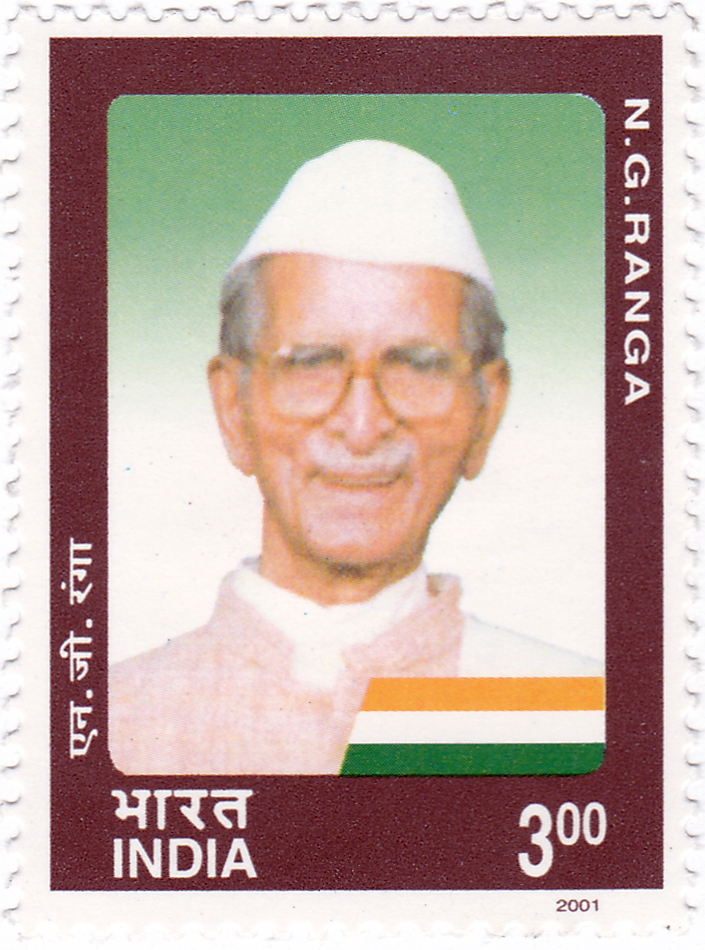
- N. G. Ranga on postage stamp - 2001

Member of Parliament, Lok Sabha
- In office 21 January 1980 - 13 March 1991
- Preceded by: Kotha Raghuramaiah
- Succeeded by: S. M. Laljan Basha
- Constituency: Guntur
- In office 10 May 1957 – 31 March 1962
- Preceded by: Kotha Raghuramaiah
- Succeeded by: Kolla Venkaiah
- Constituency: Tenali

Member of Parliament, Rajya Sabha
- In office 18 July 1977 – 08 January 1980
- Preceded by: Kasu Brahmananda Reddy
- Succeeded by: Roda Mistry
- Constituency: Andhra Pradesh
- In office 03 April 1952 – 16 March 1957
- Preceded by: Institution Established
- Succeeded by: Mudumala Henry Samuel
- Constituency: Madras

Personal details
- Born: 7 November 1900 Nidubrolu, Madras Presidency, British India (now Andhra Pradesh, India)
- Died: 9 June 1995 (aged 94) Guntur, Andhra Pradesh, India
- Spouse: Bharathi Devi
- Education: Oxford University
- Occupation: Social, political activist

Acharya Gogineni Ranga Nayukulu (7 November 1900 – 9 June 1995), also known as N. G. Ranga, was an Indian freedom fighter, classical liberal, parliamentarian and farmers' leader. He was the founding president of the Swatantra Party, and an exponent of the peasant philosophy. He received the Padma Vibhushan award for his contributions to the Peasant Movement. N.G. Ranga served in the Indian Parliament for six decades, from 1930 to 1991.

== Early life ==
Ranga was born in Nidubrolu village in Guntur district of Andhra Pradesh. He went to school in his native village, and graduated from the Andhra-Christian College, Guntur. He received a BLitt degree in Economics from the University of Oxford in 1926. Upon his return to India, he started teaching as a professor of economics at Pachaiyappa's College, Madras (Chennai).

In Oxford, Ranga was influenced by the works of H. G. Wells, Sydney Webb, Bertrand Russell, and John Stuart Mill. Initially attracted to guild socialism in Europe, the progress of the USSR would turn him into a Marxist. Later, the Stalinist oppression of peasants and forced collectivization in the 1930s drove Ranga away from the Marxist fold.

Ranga met Mahatma Gandhi in Madras and was so impressed that he joined the civil disobedience movement in 1929. He became part of mainstream politics with his entry in the central assembly in 1930. He opposed the Simon Commission report and participated in the first Round Table Conference in London.

Based on methodology of the British Labour Party's political school, he went on to establish similar schools in Andhra to turn peasants into politically conscious citizens. The first Andhra Farmers’ School was opened in 1934 at his native village Nidubrolu.

== Freedom movement ==
Ranga joined the freedom movement inspired by Gandhi's clarion call in 1930. He led the ryot (peasant) agitation in 1933. He wrote a book, Bapu Blesses (బాపూ దీవెనలు), about his discussions with Gandhi.

In the course of the Indian freedom struggle, he led the historic Ryot Agitation of Andhra in 1933. His pro-peasantry advocacy was reflected in his support of the farmers’ agitation against the zamindari oppression at Venkatagiri. He convinced Gandhi to support the movement, despite opposition from other members of Congress. The peasant movement gradually intensified and spread across the rest of India. All of these radical developments on the peasant front culminated in the formation of the All India Kisan Sabha (AIKS) at the Lucknow session of the Indian National Congress in April 1936, with Sahajanda Saraswati elected as its first president and Ranga as a general secretary. The Kisan Manifesto, which was released in August 1936, demanded the abolition of the zamindari system and the cancellation of rural debts.

Ranga continuously organized farmers of the region. Along with his wife, Bharathi Devi, he associated himself with the Satyagraha (1940) and the Quit India Movement (1942), and also played a decisive role in connecting peasants with the national liberation movement. He was elected as a member of the Constituent Assembly in 1946 and became a member of the Provisional Parliament of India until after the first elections under the new constitution in 1952.

== Contributions to literature ==
Ranga wrote multiple books, one of them being Bapu Blesses, regarding his discussions with Gandhi. Ranga's academic publications were mostly written about the conditions of peasants and laborers in the countryside. Known as Rythu Ranga and Coolie Ranga, he fought against both the colonial and socialist Indian state to ensure dignity for farmers. He wrote other books on diverse subjects like the credo of world peasantry, economic organization of Indian villages, and the Indian adult education movement.

=== Publications ===
Ranga published 65 books in English, including:

- Credo of World Peasants
- Agony and Solace - 2 volumes
- Gandhian Plan
- History of Kisan Movement
- Revolutionary Peasant (1954)
- Colonial and Coloured Peoples' Freedom Front (1957)
- Aerial-eye View of USSR and Yugoslavia (1956) - published by Parliament
- Tribes of Nilgiris, Self-Employment Sector (1959)
- Fight for Freedom (Autobiography 1967)
- Bapu Blesses (containing the discussions and talks with Mahatma Gandhi) (1969)
- Distinguished Acquaintances - 2 volumes (1976)
- Quintessence of Non-alignment Movement (1983)
- India in the U.N. Ranga's participation (1983)
- Protection of the Self-Employed Peasants and Tribes (1984)

He also published 15 books in Telugu, including:

- Modern Political Institutions - 2 volumes (1933)
- Harijans Nayak (1934)
- Smrities of Bharati Devi (1973)

== Political career ==
In 1951, in a closely contested presidential election of the Andhra Pradesh Congress Committee, Ranga was defeated by Neelam Sanjiva Reddy. Due to ideological differences, Ranga and Tanguturi Prakasam resigned from Congress and organized the Hyderabad State Praja Party, which was further split into the Krishikar Lok Party (KLP) for peasants, under the leadership of Ranga as the president. KLP contested the 1951 Lok Sabha elections, winning one seat. KLP also contested the 1952 Madras Legislative Assembly election and won 15 seats. In the 1955 Andhra State Legislative Assembly election, Congress, Praja Party and KLP formed an alliance and KLP won 22 seats. After the election, on the request of Nehru, Ranga merged KLP with the Congress party. He was elected to Congress in the 1957 general election from Tenali Lok Sabha constituency.

=== Swatantra Party ===
Ranga's differences with Nehru were visible from the beginning. As part of the Kumarappa Committee on land reforms, he did not support land ceiling measures. Ranga was also opposed to the whole socialist apparatus of the Five-Year Plans and Planning Commission. He refused to join Nehru's cabinet when offered a ministerial berth. In response to Nehru's advocacy of cooperative farming, Ranga mobilized lakhs of peasants in Machilipatnam to oppose the abolition of property rights by the state. The 1959 Nagpur Resolution of INC was the final straw. The socialists in Congress proposed cooperative farming to emulate Mao's collectivization drive. The threat to property rights in an increasingly socialist India galvanized a disparate set of anti-Congress leaders to come together and form the Swatantra Party. Ranga became the party's first president.

As a Swatantrite parliamentarian, Ranga's advocacy of liberty was most visible during the debates over the proposed 17th amendment in 1964. The amendment would empower state governments to acquire land from ordinary farmers without paying for it. Ranga's rousing speech in Parliament against the bill led to its defeat. Ranga's concern for farmers’ welfare was recognized by Nehru, who said, "As long as Rangaji is in Parliament, the Indian peasants could sleep without any worry." On the question of his opposition to Nehru, Ranga clarified: "It was for the freedom of the peasants and in defense of dharma. I’ve visualized the resulting implications of his anti-farmer policies. Knowing fully well that opposing Pandit Nehru can be politically dangerous to me, I performed my duty in defense of my convictions."

== Later years ==
The dissident parties, the Congress (O), Jan Sangh and the Samyukta Socialist Party, formed an alliance with Swatantra Party called the National Democratic Front and fought against the Indian National Congress led by Indira Gandhi in the 1971 Indian general elections. After facing the massive defeat of his Swatantra party in the elections, Ranga rejoined the Indian National Congress and supported Indira Gandhi, to advance his goal of uplifting peasants.

Ranga worked as a member of the Congress Working Committee (CWC 1975–85), and Deputy Leader of Congress Parliamentary Party (1980–1991).

== Global policy ==
He was one of the signatories of the agreement to convene a convention for drafting a world constitution. As a result, for the first time in human history, a World Constituent Assembly convened to draft and adopt the Constitution for the Federation of Earth.

== Death ==
Ranga died on 9 June 1995. Prime Minister P. V. Narasimha Rao said that when Ranga died, the country lost an outstanding parliamentarian who was a champion of public causes and rural peasants. The Andhra Pradesh government declared a 3-day state mourning period.

== Honors ==
- Agricultural University of Andhra Pradesh in Hyderabad (now in Telangana) was named in his honor and memory as Acharya N. G. Ranga Agricultural University, which later was shifted to Lam, Guntur from August 2014.
- Ranga was in the Guinness Book of World Records as a parliamentarian with 50 years of service. He was elected to Rajya Sabha from Madras State in 1952 and Andhra Pradesh in 1977. He represented Tenali, Chittoor, Srikakulam and Guntur constituencies in Lok Sabha at various times from 1957 to 1991.
- Indian parliamentarians congratulating him on 50 years of his parliamentary career and the 60-year anniversary of his first speech in Central Legislative Assembly on 11 July 1930.
- Recipient of Nehru Award for Literacy Campaign, Rajaji Ratna Award and Kushak Ratna Award.
- The statue of Ranga at Gate No. 4 of Parliament House was unveiled by the then Vice-president Krishan Kant on 27 July 1998. The statue was donated by the government of Andhra Pradesh.
- The N. G. Ranga Farmer Award for Diversified Agriculture was instituted by the Indian Council of Agricultural Research in 2001.
- Padma Vibhushan in 1991 for his contributions to public service.
- A commemorative postage stamp was released by the government of India in 2001.
