= Roman Catholic Diocese of Guntur =

Roman Catholic diocese in Andhra Pradesh, India

Coordinates: 16.2900°N 80.2605°E

Diocese of Guntur Dioecesis Gunturensis గుంటూరు డియోసెస్

Location
- Country: India
- Ecclesiastical province: Visakhapatnam
- Metropolitan: Visakhapatnam

Statistics
- Area: 12,803 km^{2} (4,943 sq mi)
- Population: Total; Catholics: (as of 2006); 2,091,075; 8,18,097 (4.2%)

Information
- Denomination: Roman Catholic
- Sui iuris church: Latin Church
- Rite: Roman Rite
- Established: 13 February 1940
- Cathedral: Bala Yesu Cathedral (Infant Jesus Cathedral) in Phirangipuram

Current leadership
- Pope: Sede vacante
- Bishop: Bhagaiah Chinnabathini
- Metropolitan Archbishop: Prakash Mallavarapu

The Roman Catholic Diocese of Guntur, Andhra Pradesh, India was created out of the Diocese of Nellore, 1940. Msgr Thomas Pothacamury was its First Bishop.

The present bishop of the diocese is the Most Rev. Bhagaiah Chinnabathini.

The cathedral of the Diocese is in Phirangipuram.

== Bishops of Guntur ==
- The Most Rev. Thomas Pothacamury (Pothakamuri) (9 April 1940 – 15 October 1942)
- The Most Rev. Ignatius Mummadi (13 July 1943 – 26 November 1973)
- The Most Rev. Balashoury Thanugundla (26 November 1973 – 25 September 1974)
- The Most Rev. Mariadas Kagithapu M.S.F.S. (19 December 1974 – 10 September 1982)
- The Most Rev. Bishop Gali Bali (2 July 1984 Appointed - retired June 2016)
- The Most Rev. Bishop Bhagaiah Chinnabathini (25 June 2016 appointed Bishop)

== Parishes in Guntur Diocese ==
A few of the parishes with thousands of the faithful followers of the Roman Catholic religion in Guntur Diocese:

- Angalakuduru
- Attalur
- Kanaparyu
- Kuchipudi
- Mutluru
- Patibandla:
- Phirangipuram: A village consists of most number of Roman Catholics.
- Ravipadu
- Rentachintala
- Reddipalem
- Repalle
- Siripuram
- Tenali
- Thallacheruvu: 90% of the village consists of Roman Catholics.
- Thubadu

Vijayapuri south

- Thurakapalem100% catholics in the village and all of them belong to Gandikota Kamma community.
- Velangini Nagar 90% of the residents of Velangini Nagar are Roman Catholics only.

== Saints and causes for canonisation ==
- Servant of God Sr. Dr. Mary Glowrey, JMJ
