= Diocese of Vijayawada =

Roman Catholic diocese in Andhra Pradesh, India

Coordinates: 16.4995°N 80.6567°E

Diocese of Vijayawada Dioecesis Viiayavadanus

Location
- Country: India
- Territory: Andhra Pradesh
- Ecclesiastical province: Visakhapatnam
- Metropolitan: Visakhapatnam

Statistics
- Area: 8,734 km^{2} (3,372 sq mi)
- Population: Total; Catholics: (as of 2017); 4,730,650; 359,530 (7.6%)
- Parishes: 98

Information
- Denomination: Roman Catholic
- Rite: Latin Rite
- Established: 10 January 1933
- Cathedral: St Paul’s Cathedral in Vijayawada
- Co-cathedral: St Peter’s Co-Cathedral in Vijayawada
- Patron Saints: Saints Peter and Paul
- Secular priests: 276
- Language: Telugu, English

Current leadership
- Pope: Leo XIV
- Bishop: Thelagathoti J. Raja Rao, S.M.M.
- Metropolitan Archbishop: Udumala Bala Showreddy
- Vicar General: Msgr. Muvvala Prasad, Msgr. Mesapam Gabriel

Map
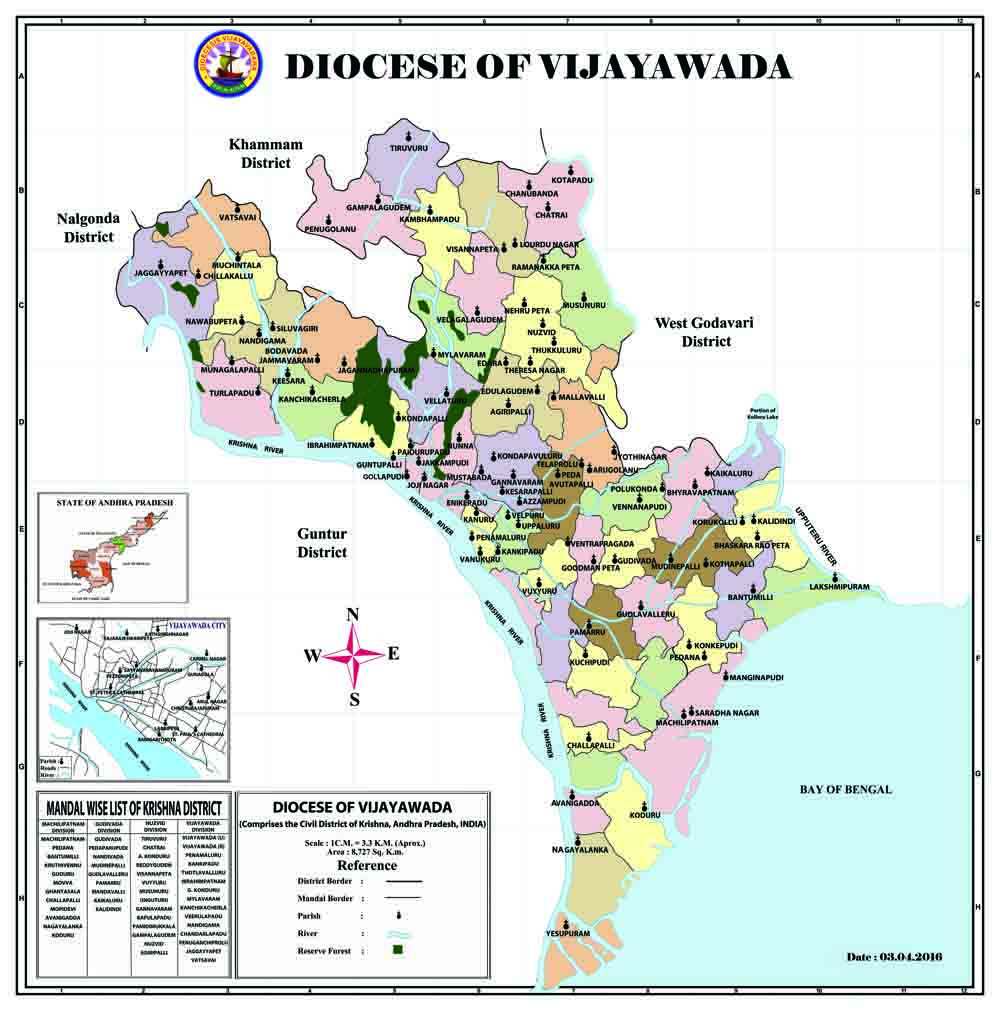

Website
- www.vijayawadadiocese.org

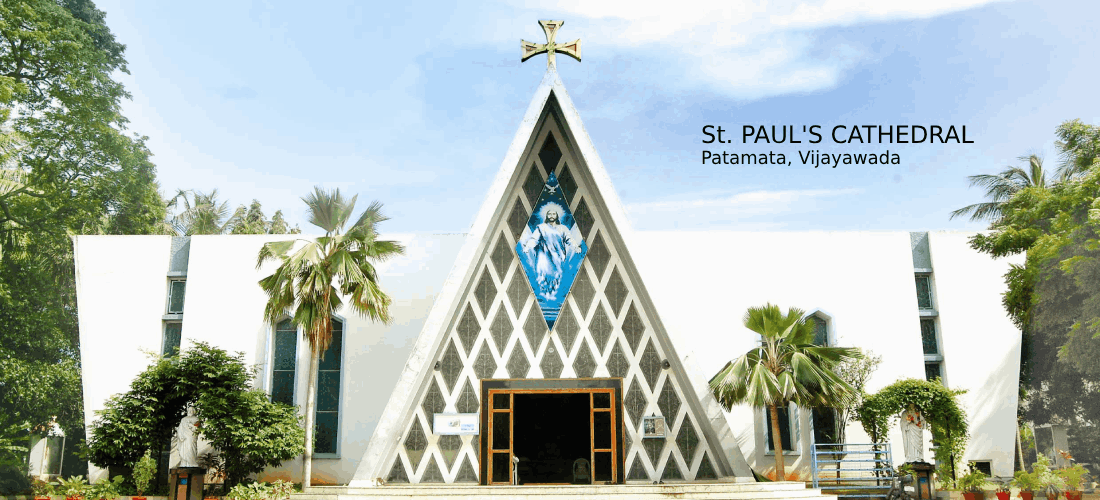
St.Paul's Cathedral, Vijayawada

The Roman Catholic Diocese of Vijayawada (Latin: Viiayavadan(us)) is a diocese located in the city of Vijayawada in the ecclesiastical province of Visakhapatnam in India. Administratively, the diocese encompasses the geographical Krishna district of the state of Andhra Pradesh . The Diocese of Vijayawada has the largest Catholic population (359,000) among all the Suffragan dioceses of the Archdiocese of Visakhapatnam.

== History ==
- 10 January 1933: Established as Mission “sui iuris” of Bezwada from the Diocese of Hyderabad
- 13 April 1937: Promoted as Diocese of Bezwada
- 21 October 1950: Renamed as Diocese of Vijayawada

== Diocesan demographics ==
As of 2017 the Catholic population of the diocese was 350,000. These Catholics were served by 189 diocesan priests and 32 priests of religious orders in 98 parishes. Also laboring in the diocese were 37 religious brothers and 795 nuns.

== Leadership ==
- Bishop Thelagathoti J. Raja Rao, S.M.M. (2 February 2016 – Present)
- Bishop Prakash Mallavarapu (26 July 2002 – 3 July 2012); named Metropolitan Archbishop of Visakhapatnam
- Bishop Marampudi Joji (Later Archbishop) (8 November 1996 – 29 January 2000)
- Bishop Joseph S. Thumma (23 January 1971 – 8 November 1996)
- Bishop Ambrose De Battista, P.I.M.E. (13 December 1951 – 23 January 1971)

== Parishes ==
St.Paul's Cathedral	St.Peter's Co-Cathedral	Agiripalli
Ajitsinghnagar	Arugolanu	Assisi nagar (Konkepudi)
Avanigadda	Avutapalli (Peda Avutapalli)	Azzampudi
Bantumilli	Bhaskarao Peta (Vijayawada)	Bhyravapatnam
Bodavada- Jammavaram	Carmel Nagar (Vijayawada)	Challapalli
Chanubanda	Chatrai	Chillakallu
Christurajupuram (Vijayawada)	Edara	Edulagudem
Enikepadu	Gampalagudem	Gannavaram
Gollapudi (Vijayawada)	Goodmanpeta	Gudivada
Gudlavalleru	Gunadala	Guntupalli (Vijayawada)
Jagannadhapuram	Jaggayyapeta	Jeevan Nagar (Jakkampudi)
Jojinagar (Vijayawada)	Jyothinagar	Kaikaluru
Kalidindi	Kambhampadu	Kanchikacherla
Kankipadu (Vijayawada)	Kanuru (Vijayawada)	Keesara
Kesarapalli	Koduru	Kondapalli
Kondapavuluru	Korukollu	Kotapadu
Kothapalli	Kuchipudi	Labbipeta (Vijayawada)
Lourdhunagar (Vijayawada)	Machilipatnam	Mallavalli
Manginapudi	Mariapuram (Lakshmipuram)	Muchintala
Mudinepalli	Munagalapalli	Musunuru
Mylavaram	Nagayalanka	Nandigama
Nawabupeta	Nehrupeta	Nunna
Nuzvid	Paidurupadu	Pamarru
Peda-mustabad	Pedana	Penamaluru (Vijayawada)
Penugolanu	Pezzonipeta (Vijayawada)	Polukonda
Raja Rajeswaripeta (Vijayawada)	Ramanakkapeta	Ranigarithota (Vijayawada)
Sahaya Nagar (Ibrahimpatnam)	Saradanagar	Satynarayanapuram (Vijayawada)
Siluvagirinagar	Telaprolu	Theresanagar
Thukkuluru	Thurlapadu	Tiruvuru
Uppaluru	Vanukuru	Vatsavai
Velagalagudem	Vellaturu	Velpuru (Vijayawada)
Vennanapudi	Ventrapragada	Vissannapeta
Vuyyuru	Yesupuram	

== Shrines ==
- Gunadala Matha Shrine
- Br Joseph Thamby Shrine Avutapally
- Lourdu Matha Shrine, Vennanapudi

== Seminaries ==
- St. Ambrose Minor Seminary, Nuzivid (1957)
- Angel Minor Seminary, Nuzivid
- St.Paul's Regional Seminary (1984)
- St.Joseph's Major Seminary, Chinavutapalli (2000)

== Education ==
As of 2019, the diocese has 27 Elementary Schools, 9 Upper primary Schools, 50 High Schools, 3 Higher Secondary Schools, 10 Colleges, 2 Nursing training Institutes, 10 Non-Formal training centers, 16 Parish Elementary Schools departing education from pre-kindergarten through Post Graduation.

Catholic Institutions of Repute :

- Andhra Loyola college
- Maris Stella College
- NSM Public School,
- Nirmala High School
- VSt.Johns, Gannavaram
- Atkinsons High
- St.Mary's English Medium School, Kankipadu

== Media & Publications ==
- RADIO MARIA, Vijayawada.
- DIVYAVANI TV Zonal Productions, Vijayawada.
- IN VINCULO CHRISTI (Published since 1957)

== Saints and causes for canonisation ==
- Servant of God Joseph Thamby, OFS
