= Addagatla Chinna Innayya =

Indian prelate of the Catholic Church (1937–2022)

His Excellency Addagatla Chinna Innayya
- Bishop of Srikakulam
- Church: Roman Catholic Church
- Archdiocese: Roman Catholic Archdiocese of Visakhapatnam
- Diocese: Roman Catholic Diocese of Srikakulam
- See: Srikakulam
- Appointed: 1 July 1993
- Term ended: 12 December 2018
- Predecessor: Post created
- Successor: Rayarala Vijay Kumar
- Previous post: Bishop of Nalgonda (1989–1993)

Orders
- Ordination: 4 January 1965
- Consecration: 29 June 1989 by Mariadas Kagithapu

Personal details
- Born: 2 May 1937 Ravipadu, Andhra Pradesh, British Raj
- Died: 1 April 2022 (aged 84) Srikakulam, India
- Motto: AD MAJOREM DEI GLORIAM

Addagatla Chinna Innayya (2 May 1937 – 1 April 2022) was an Indian prelate of the Catholic Church who served as Bishop of Srikakulam, in the state of Andhra Pradesh, India, from 1993 to 2018.

== Biography ==
Innayya was appointed Bishop of Nalgonda on 17 April 1989 and subsequently ordained on 29 June 1989 by the principal consecrator, Bishop Kagithapu Mariadas and co-consecrators, Archbishop Saminini Arulappa and Bishop John Mulagada at the Maria Rani Cathedral in Nalgonda.

In 1993, the Pope John Paul II named him Bishop of the newly erected Diocese of Srikakulam.

On 12 December 2018, Pope Francis accepted his resignation as bishop.

Religious titles
Preceded by Post created	Bishop of Srikakulam; 1993–2018	Succeeded by Rayarala Vijay Kumar
Preceded by Mathew Cheriankunnel	Bishop of Nalgonda; 1989–1993	Succeeded by Joji Govindu
