= Siripuram =

Siripuram may refer to:

- Siripuram, Visakhapatnam, a locality in Visakhapatnam
- Siripuram, Nalgonda district, a village in Nalgonda district, Telangana, India
- Siripuram, Guntur district, a village in Guntur district, Andhra Pradesh, India
- Siripuram, Srikakulam district, a village in Srikakulam district, Andhra Pradesh, India
