= Prakash Mallavarapu =

Indian Roman Catholic prelate (1949–2026)

His Excellency Prakash Mallavarapu
- Archbishop of Visakhapatnam
- Church: Roman Catholic Church
- Archdiocese: Visakhapatnam
- Appointed: 3 July 2012
- Term ended: 17 February 2024
- Predecessor: Mariadas Kagithapu
- Successor: Udumala Bala Showreddy
- Other post: Apostolic Administrator of Srikakulam (2 January – 2 September 2019)
- Previous posts: Bishop of Cuddapah (1998–2002); Bishop of Vijayawada (2002–2012)

Orders
- Ordination: 11 October 1979
- Consecration: 22 July 1998 by Saminini Arulappa, Bali Gali and John Mulagada

Personal details
- Born: 29 January 1949 Jadi-Jamalpur, Hyderabad State, India
- Died: 7 June 2026 (aged 77) Visakhapatnam, Andhra Pradesh, India

Prakash Mallavarapu (29 January 1949 – 7 June 2026) was an Indian Roman Catholic prelate who was the Archbishop of the Visakhapatnam, in the state of Andhra Pradesh.

== Bishopric ==
=== Kadapa ===
Prakash Mallavarapu was first appointed Bishop of Cuddapah on 22 May 1989 and subsequently ordained Bishop on 22 July 1998 by the principal consecrator, Bishop S. Arulappa and co-consecrators, Bishop M. John and Bishop G. Bali at the St. Mary's Cathedral in Kadapa.

=== Vijayawada ===
On 26 July 1992, the Holy See transferred Prakash from the Diocese of Kadapa to the Diocese of Vijayawada.

== Archbishopric ==
On 3 July 2012, the Holy See again transferred Prakash from the Diocese of Vijayawada to the archdiocese of Visakhapatnam.

After reaching his 75th birthday in January 2024, Pope Francis accepted his resignation on 16 February 2024.

== Death ==
Prakash Mallavarapu died on 7 June 2026, at the age of 77.

Catholic Church titles
Preceded by Mariadas Kagithapu	Archbishop of Visakhapatnam; 2012–2024	Succeeded by Udumala Bala Showreddy
Preceded by Marampudi Joji	Bishop of Vijayawada; 2002–2012	Succeeded by Joseph Raja Rao
Preceded by Abraham Aruliah Somavarapa	Bishop of Cuddapah; 1998–2002	Succeeded by D. M. Prakasam
