= Korrapadu, Guntur district =

Korrapadu
- Village
- Interactive map of Korrapadu
- Location in Andhra Pradesh, India
- Coordinates: 16°22′34″N 80°14′13″E
- Country: India
- State: Andhra Pradesh
- District: Guntur
- Mandal: Medikonduru

Government
  - Type: Panchayati raj
  - Body: Korrapadu gram panchayat

Area
  - Total: 1,458 ha (3,600 acres)

Population (2011)
  - Total: 3,103
  - Density: 212.8/km^{2} (551.2/sq mi)

Languages
  - Official: Telugu
- Time zone: UTC+5:30 (IST)
- PIN: 522xxx
- Area code: +91–863
- Vehicle registration: AP

Korrapadu is a village in Guntur district of the Indian state of Andhra Pradesh. It is located in Medikonduru mandal of Guntur revenue division.

== Geography ==
Korrapadu is situated to the northwest of the mandal headquarters, Medikonduru, at 16.3749154°N 80.1791297°E. It is spread over an area of 1,458 ha (3,600 acres).

== Governance ==
Korrapadu gram panchayat is the local self-government of the village. It is divided into wards and each ward is represented by a ward member. The village forms a part of Andhra Pradesh Capital Region and is under the jurisdiction of APCRDA.

== Education ==
As per the school information report for the academic year 2018–19, the village has a total of 4 schools. These include one private and 3 Zilla Parishad/MPP schools.

== See also ==
- List of villages in Guntur district
