= Paladugu =

- Village
- Interactive map of Paladugu
- Location in Andhra Pradesh, India
- Coordinates: 16.3916614°N 80.2590952°E
- Country: India
- State: Andhra Pradesh
- District: Guntur
- Mandal: Medikonduru

Government
  - Type: Panchayati raj
  - Body: Paladugu gram panchayat

Area
  - Total: 1,254 ha (3,100 acres)

Population (2011)
  - Total: 3,702
  - Density: 295.2/km^{2} (764.6/sq mi)

Languages
  - Official: Telugu
- Time zone: UTC+5:30 (IST)
- PIN: 522xxx
- Area code: +91–863
- Vehicle registration: AP

Paladugu is a village in Guntur district of the Indian state of Andhra Pradesh. It is located in Medikonduru mandal of Guntur revenue division.

== Geography ==
Paladugu is situated to the northwest of the mandal headquarters, Medikonduru, at 16.3916614°N 80.2590952°E. It is spread over an area of 1,254 ha (3,100 acres).

== Demographics ==
The village of Paladugu covers an area of about 1,250 hectares (3,100 acres) and has a population 3,640 inhabitants, with 1,846 males and 1,794 females living in 929 houses. Telugu is the official language, but Urdu is also spoken by large numbers of inhabitants.

== Governance ==
Paladugu gram panchayat is the local self-government of the village. It is divided into wards and each ward is represented by a ward member. The village forms a part of Andhra Pradesh Capital Region and is under the jurisdiction of APCRDA.

== Education ==
As per the school information report for the academic year 2018–19, the village has a total of 3 Zilla Parishad/MPP schools.
