= Perecherla =

- suburban of Guntur City. = Guntur
- Location in Andhra Pradesh, India
- Coordinates: 16°19′53.207″N 80°21′9.423″E
- Country: India
- State: Andhra Pradesh
- District: Guntur
- Mandal: Medikonduru, Guntur

Government
  - Type: Panchayati raj
  - Body: Perecherla gram panchayat

Area
  - Total: 1,666 ha (4,120 acres)

Population (2011)
  - Total: 16,563
  - Density: 994.2/km^{2} (2,575/sq mi)

Languages
  - Official: Telugu
- Time zone: UTC+5:30 (IST)
- PIN: 522005
- Area code: +91–863
- Vehicle registration: AP

Perecherla is a village in Guntur district of the Indian state of Andhra Pradesh. It is located in Medikonduru mandal of Guntur revenue division.

== Geography ==
Perecherla is situated to the east of the mandal headquarters, Medikonduru, at 16°19′18″N 80°20′35″E. It is spread over an area of 1,666 ha (4,120 acres).

== Demographics ==
As of 2011 Census of India, the town had a population of 16,563, of which males are 8,617, females are 7,946 and the population under 6 years of age are 1,842.

== Governance ==
Perecherla gram panchayat is the local self-government of the village. It is divided into wards and each ward is represented by a ward member. The village forms a part of Andhra Pradesh Capital Region and is under the jurisdiction of APCRDA.

== Education ==
As per the school information report for the academic year 2018–19, the village has a total of 19 schools. These include 9 Zilla Parishad/MPP and 10 private schools.

== See also ==
- List of villages in Guntur district
