= Ponugupadu =

- Village
- Interactive map of Ponugupadu
- Location in Andhra Pradesh, India Ponugupadu (India)
- Coordinates: 16.279895°N 80.144952°E
- Country: India
- State: Andhra Pradesh
- District: Guntur
- Assembly constituency: Tadikonda

Area
  - Total: 18.24 km^{2} (7.04 sq mi)

Languages
  - Official: Telugu, Urdu
- Time zone: UTC+5:30 (IST)
- Postal code: 522549

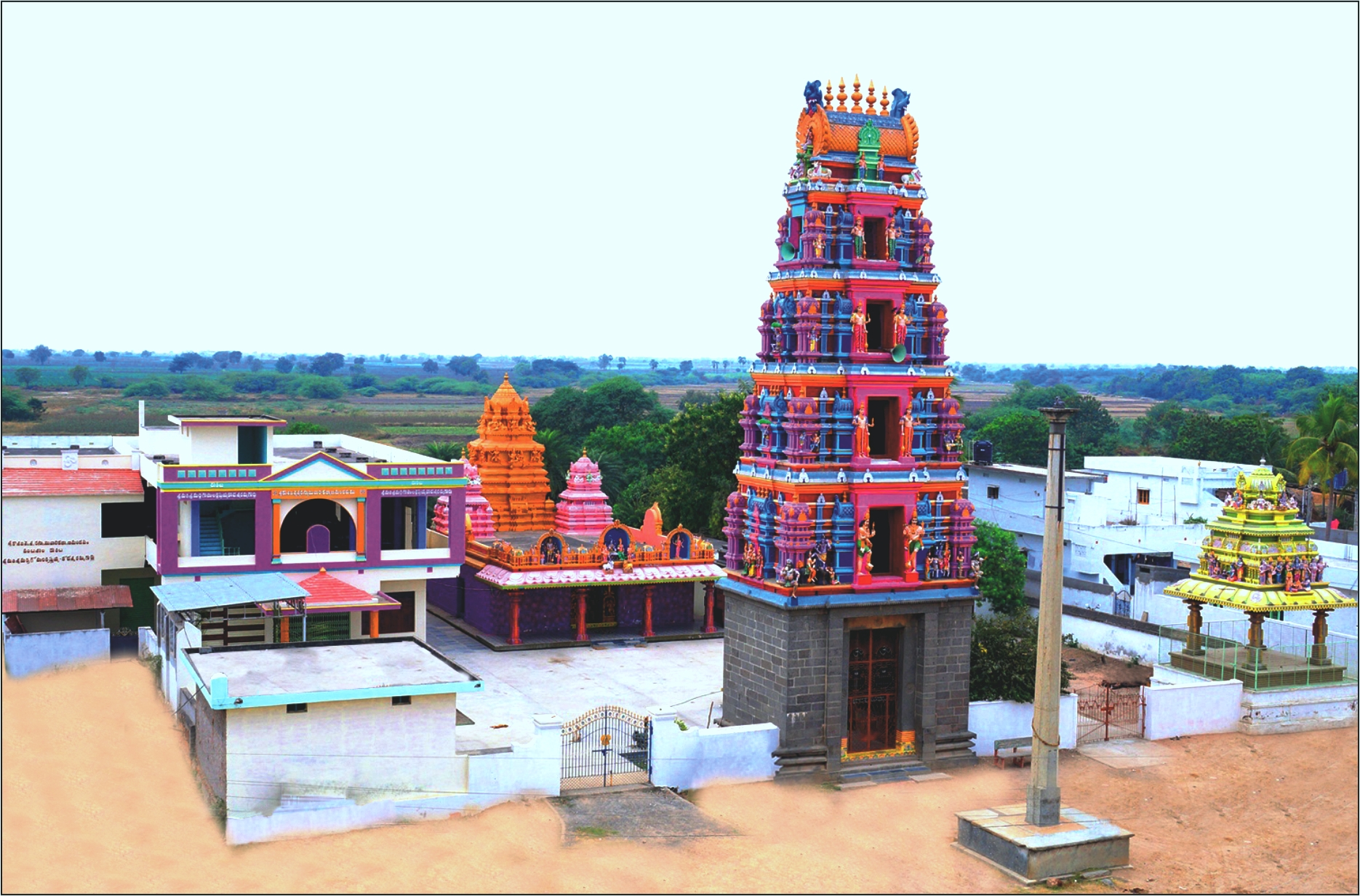
Sree Visweswaraswamy Temple Ponugupadu

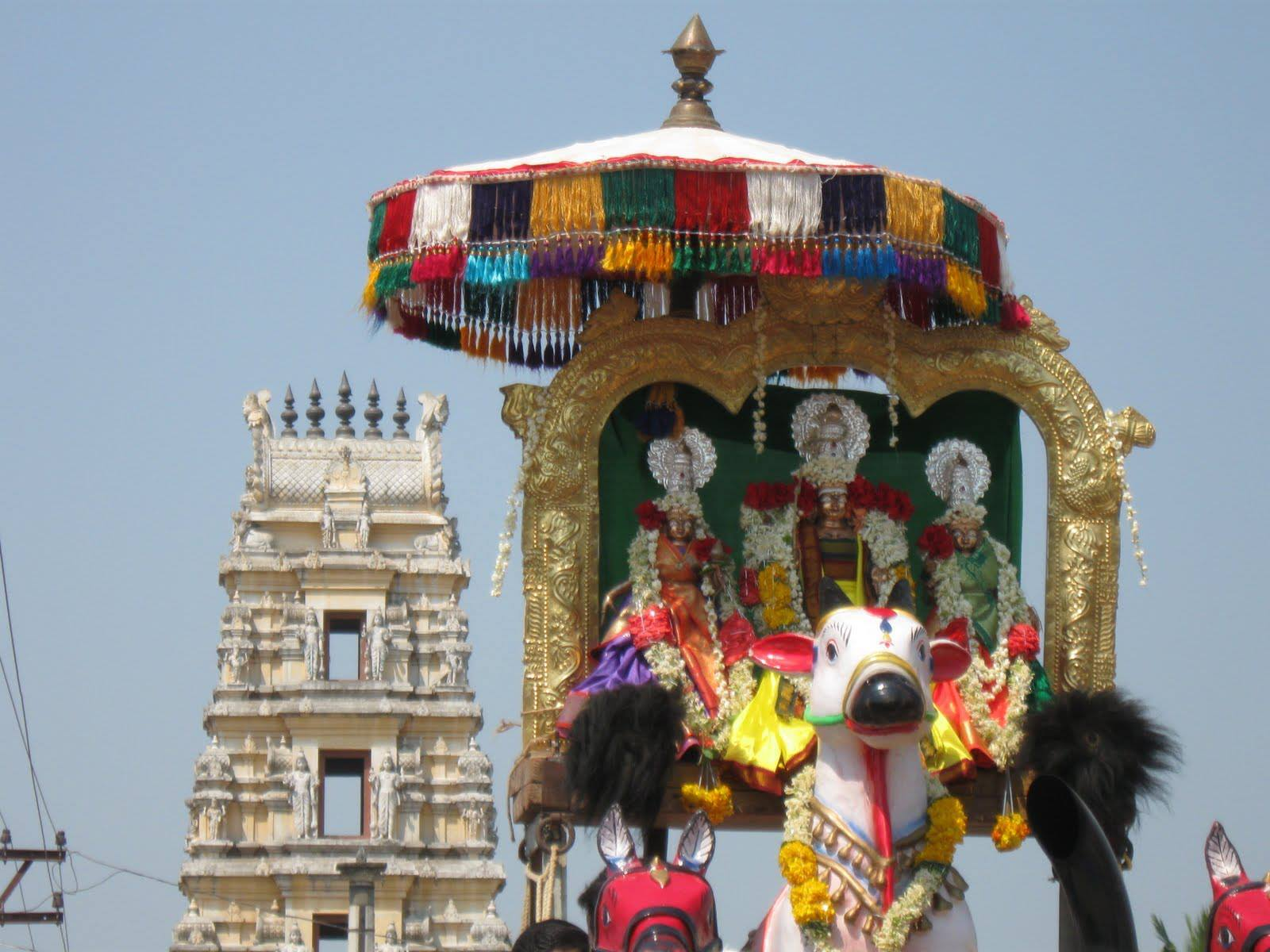
Ponugupadu Sri Kasi visweswara Swami Vari Devasthanam,99th Anniversary uregimpu

Ponugupadu is a village in Phirangipuram Mandal, Guntur district, Andhra Pradesh, India. The village is 12 km from Narasaraopet and 3 km from Sathuluru Railway Station ( on Guntur – Narsaraopet Line).

== Demographics ==
The village is home to 4356 people, among them 2213 (51%) are male and 2143 (49%) are female. 59% of the whole population are from general caste, 39% are from schedule caste and 3% are schedule tribes. Child (aged under 6 years) population of Ponugupadu village is 10%, among them 56% are boys and 44% are girls. There are 1217 households in the village and an average 4 persons live in every family.

	Total	General	Schedule Caste	Schedule Tribe	Child
Total	4,356	2,562	1,678	116	414
Male	2,213	1,290	863	60	233
Female	2,143	1,272	815	56	181

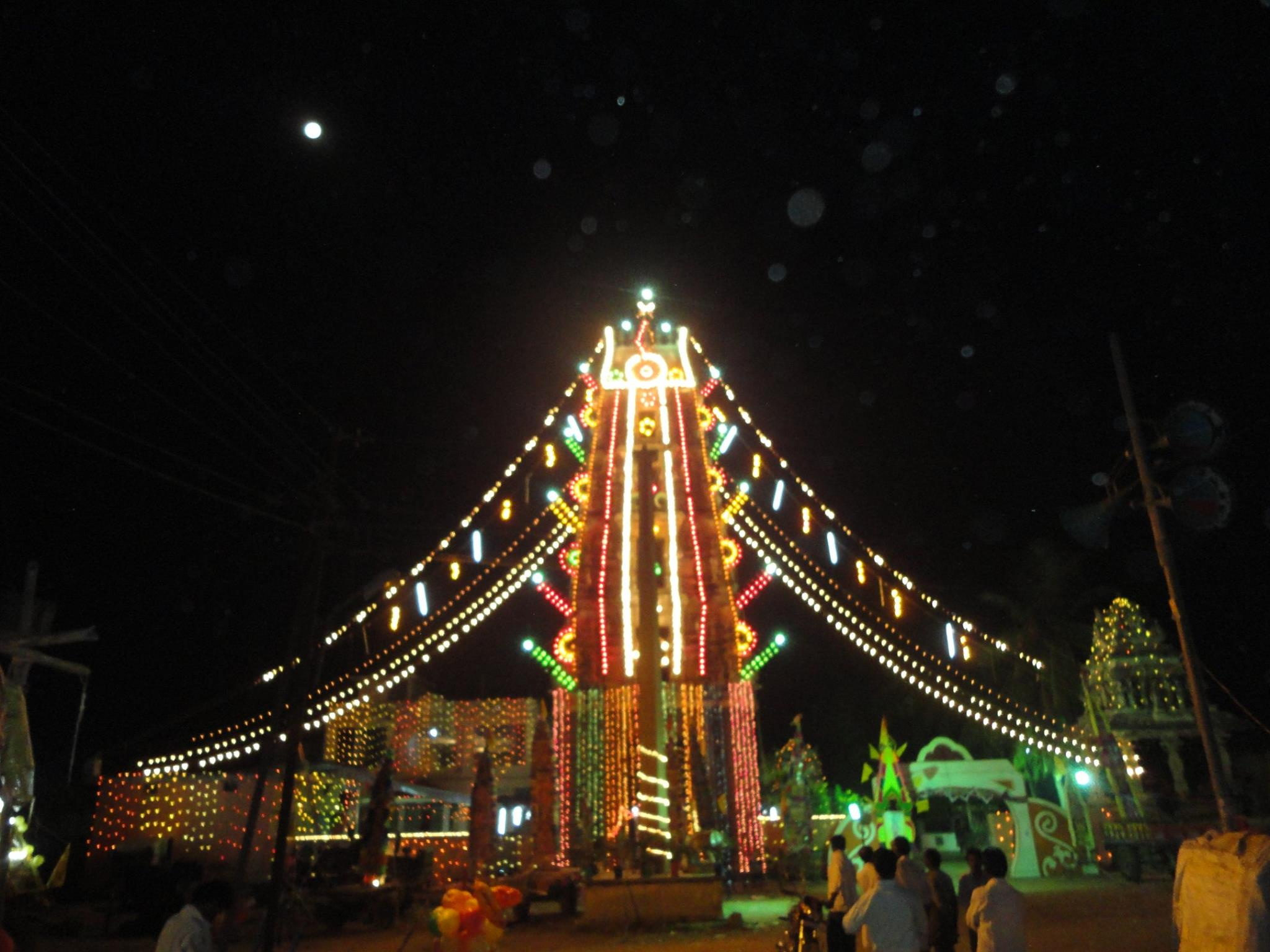
Sri Kasi visweswara Swami Vari Devasthanam,99th Anniversary-ponugupadu

== Growth of population ==
Population of the village has increased by 3.5% in last 10 years. In 2001 census total population here were 4209. Female population growth rate of the village is 3.8% which is 0.6% higher than male population growth rate of 3.2%. General caste population has decreased by −2.4%; Schedule caste population has increased by 14.1%; Schedule Tribe population has increased by 2.7% and child population has decreased by −11.9% in the village since last census.

	Total	General	Schedule Caste	Schedule Tribe	Child
Total	3.5%	−2.4%	14.1%	2.7%	−11.9%
Male	3.2%	−3.2%	15.2%	−4.8%	−7.9%
Female	3.8%	−1.5%	12.9%	12%	−16.6%

== Sex Ratio – Females per 1000 Male ==
As of 2011 census there are 968 females per 1000 male in the village. Sex ratio in general caste is 986, in schedule caste is 944 and in schedule tribe is 933. There are 777 girls under 6 years of age per 1000 boys of the same age in the village. Overall sex ratio in the village has increased by 6 females per 1000 male during the years from 2001 to 2011. Child sex ratio here has decreased by 81 girls per 1000 boys during the same time.

=== Change in sex ratio 2001 to 2011 – Ponugupadu ===
	Total	General	SC	ST	Child
Change	6	17	−20	139	−81
2011	968	986	944	933	777
2001	962	969	964	794	858

== Literacy ==
Total 2442 people in the village are literate, among them 1383 are male and 1059 are female. Literacy rate (children under 6 are excluded) of Ponugupadu is 62%. 70% of male and 54% of female population are literate here. Overall literacy rate in the village has increased by 5%. Male literacy has gone up by 4% and female literacy rate has gone up by 7%.

=== Change in literacy rate 2001 to 2011 – Ponugupadu ===
	Total	Male	Female
Change	5.3%	3.3%	7.5%
2011	61.9%	69.8%	54%
2001	56.6%	66.5%	46.5%

== Workers profile ==
Ponugupadu has 58% (2534) population engaged in either main or marginal works. 61% male and 55% female population are working population. 59% of total male population are main (full time) workers and 2% are marginal (part time) workers. For women 50% of total female population are main and 4% are marginal workers.

=== Percentage of working population – Ponugupadu ===
	Worker	Main Worker	Marginal Worker	Non Worker
Total	58.2%	54.8%	3.4%	41.8%
Male	61.4%	59.1%	2.3%	38.6%
Female	54.9%	50.4%	4.4%	45.1%
