= Heralds of Good News =

Catholic religious order

- Societas Praeconum Bonae Notitiae
- Abbreviation: HGN
- Formation: 14 October 1984; 42 years ago
- Founder: Jose Kaimlett
- Founded at: Kurukuru (Andhra Pradesh), India
- Type: Society of Apostolic Life of Pontifical Right for Men
- Headquarters: R.S. Post, Eluru-534005, West Godav, Tangellamudi, India
- Members: 714 members (includes 476 priests) as of 2022
- Superior General: Thomas Kappumkal
- Parent organization: Catholic Church
- Website: heraldsofgoodnews.org
- Formerly called: Heralds of Good News

The Heralds of Good News (Latin: Societas Praeconum Bonae Notitiae), is a Catholic clerical male religious congregation of pontifical right.

== History ==
The congregation was founded on 14 October 1984 by Jose Kaimlett, who was born in Palackattumala, Andhra Pradesh. In December 1976, Paul VI established the diocese of Eluru by taking part of the territory of the Diocese of Vijayawada (it). Father Jose Kaimlett was appointed to lead this change. After the establishment of the new ecclesiastical district, he continued to serve the diocese, realizing the shortage of priests, and wanted to found a society of apostolic life to help the Church promote priestly vocations, but his responsibilities prevented him from carrying out his project. In 1984, his mission in the diocese was more or less accomplished, he obtained the agreement, approval of the constitutions and support of John Mulagada, bishop of Eluru, to create his society.

On following 12 December, were established in Kurukkuru the mother house and the first minor seminary. On 2 February 1985, the founder, three priests, and two brothers made a permanent commitment to the institute in the presence of the bishop. After Mass, the members unanimously elected Father Jose Kaimlett as the society's first director general. He was re-elected on 26 December 1990, during the second general chapter. On 5 May 1991, bishop Mulagada, in accordance with the directives of the Congregation for the Evangelization of Peoples, established the Institute of Heralds of Good News as a clerical missionary society of apostolic life under diocesan law. The institute was recognized on 5 may 1999 by John Paul II and received approval of its constitutions from the Holy See on 15 August 2009.

Two other societies of apostolic life under diocesan law were founded by Father Jose Kaimlett: the Sisters of the Good News in 1992 and the Missionary Fathers of Compassion in 2003.

== Activity and dissemination ==
The Society's goal is to encourage vocations to the priesthood and to train clergy for missions and territories where they are lacking. They are present in: Asia (India, Papua New Guinea); America: (Canada, United States, Guatemala); Africa: (South Africa, Kenya, Uganda); Europe: (Italy, Netherlands).

On 13 May 2021, pope Francis appointed Siby Mathew Peedikayil as bishop of Aitape (Papua New Guinea).
