= Gollapudi =

Places:

- Gollapudi, Vijayawada
- Gollapudi, Gampalagudem
- Gollapudi, Parchur
- Gollapudi, Musunur

Persons:

- Gollapudi Maruti Rao

Others:

- Gollapudi Srinivas Award
