= Pamireddy Pitchi Reddy =

Indian industrialist

- Born: Dokiparru, Krishna district, Andhra Pradesh, India
- Occupation: Industrialist
- Spouse: Rama Reddy Pamireddy
- Children: 3
- Parents: Pamireddy Krishna Reddy (father); Pamireddy Bhadramma (mother)

P.P. Reddy is an Indian industrialist and executive chairman of Megha Engineering and Infrastructures Limited (MEIL). As per the report of Forbes, He is one of the richest persons in Hyderabad, India.

== Life and career ==
P.P. Reddy was born into a farmer family in 1957 in Dokiparru village, Krishna district, Andhra Pradesh, India.

P.P. Reddy founded Megha Engineering Enterprises in 1989 with his two staff in Balanagar, Medchal district, Hyderabad to construct tiny pipes for municipalities.

In 2006, he changed the company's name from "Megha Engineering Enterprises" to "Megha Engineering and Infrastructure Limited (MEIL)".

2019 saw the start of the construction of Telangana's largest lift irrigation project by value, which Reddy and his business MEIL are building.

Reddy oversees the company's operations in renewable energy, irrigation, power, and water supply under MEIL. He acquired assets to enter the defense industry and launch ventures abroad in Bangladesh, Jordan, Tanzania, Zambia, and Kuwait.

== Philanthrophic Work ==
Reddy adopted his birthplace of Dokiparru in the Gudlavalleru Mandal, where he established the first free, solar-powered program for clean drinking water in the nation. The project's construction cost Rs 4 crore. Additionally, he pledged to build a hospital and school for the neighborhood. In addition to Dokiparru, Reddy has welcomed many more villages.

Reddy had previously settled at Jamulapalle, a village in the East Godavari district's Pithapuram mandal. Even a mineral water factory was built to offer the inhabitants access to clean drinking water. As part of the Swachh Bharat campaign, he took up cleaning and hygienic duties in numerous communities. He also built a wedding ceremony hall in Jamulapalli.

Additionally, Reddy built the Oncology Center at the NIMS Hospital in Hyderabad, equipped it with contemporary amenities, and offered free meals at the Osmania, Niloufer, and MNJ cancer hospitals.

== Personal life ==
Reddy is married to Rama Reddy, and the couple has two daughters, Manjali and Megha. Rama Reddy Pamireddy is one of the directors of MEIL.
