= Mariadas Kagithapu =

Mariadas Kagithapu MSFS
- Archbishop of Visakhapatnam
- Native name: మరియదాస్ కాగితపు
- Church: Catholic Church
- Archdiocese: Archdiocese of Visakhapatnam
- In office: 10 September 1982 – 3 July 2012
- Predecessor: Ignatius Gopu
- Successor: Mallavarapu Prakash
- Previous post: Bishop of Guntur (1974-1982)

Orders
- Ordination: 10 June 1961
- Consecration: 5 May 1977 by Duraisamy Simon Lourdusamy

Personal details
- Born: 7 September 1936 Gnanapuram, Vizagapatam, Presidency of Fort St. George, British Raj, British Empire
- Died: 26 February 2018 (aged 81) Visakhapatnam, Andhra Pradesh, India

Mariadas Kagithapu (7 September 1936 – 26 February 2018) was a Roman Catholic archbishop.

Archbishop Kagithapu Mariadas was born on 7 September 1936 in Gnanapuram in Visakhapatnam Diocese. He was ordained a priest on 10 June 1961 in the Congregation of Missionaries of Francis de Sales. Pope Paul VI appointed him as the fourth Bishop of Roman Catholic Diocese of Guntur on 19 December 1974 and ordained Bishop on 5 May 1977 by Cardinal Duraisamy Simon Lourdusamy. Pope John Paul II appointed him as the Bishop of Visakhapatnam on 10 September 1982 and he was installed on 26 January 1983.

With the elevation to the Archdiocese on 16 October 2001 he was appointed Archbishop of Visakhapatnam. Before becoming a prelate, Archbishop Mariadas was a professor at St. Peter's Seminary in Bangalore. On 3 July 2012, Pope Benedict XVI accepted his resignation from the pastoral care of the Diocese of Visakhapatnam. He was a priest for 56 years and a bishop for 40 years.

As a tradition Archbishop Kagithapu Mariadas's burial took place in St. Peter's Cathedral in Gnanapuram, Visakhapatnam on 28 February 2018.
