= Nuzvid railway station =

Railway station in Andhra Pradesh, India

Nuzvid

General information
- Location: Nuziveedu Rd, Hanuman Junction, Andhra Pradesh; India
- Coordinates: 16°47′N 80°51′E
- System: Indian Railways station
- Owner: Indian Railways
- Operator: Vijayawada Division
- Lines: Howrah–Chennai main line Visakhapatnam–Vijayawada section
- Platforms: 3
- Tracks: 5

Construction
- Structure type: Standard (on ground station)

Other information
- Status: Active
- Station code: NZD
- Zone(s): South Coast Railway zone
- Fare zone: SCoR

Services
Preceding station	Indian Railways	Following station
Veeravalli towards ?	Nuzvid	Vatlur towards ?
Location
- Location within Andhra Pradesh Location within India
- Interactive map

Nuzvid railway station (station code:NZD) is the railway station under the jurisdiction of Indian Railways. It serves Hanuman Junction and Nuzvid town situated in the Krishna district of Andhra Pradesh. Nuzvid railway station falls under Vijayawada railway division of South Central Railway zone. It is situated on the Howrah–Chennai main line. It is one of the 27 rural stations in the state to have Wi-Fi.

== Classification ==
In terms of earnings and outward passengers handled, Nuzvid is categorized as a Non-Suburban Grade-5 (NSG-5) railway station. Based on the re–categorization of Indian Railway stations for the period of 2017–18 and 2022–23, an NSG–5 category station earns between ₹1–₹10 crore and handles 1–2 million passengers.

== Electrification ==
The Visakhapatnam–Vijayawada section was completely electrified by 1997. The Howrah–Chennai route was completely electrified by 2005.

== See also ==
- Visakhapatnam–Vijayawada section
