= Medikonduru mandal =

- Mandal
- Interactive map of Medikonduru mandal
- Location in Andhra Pradesh, India
- Country: India
- State: Andhra Pradesh
- District: Guntur
- Headquarters: Medikonduru

Government
  - Body: Mandal Parishad
  - Tahsildar: S.Jaganmohan Rao

Population (2011)
  - Total: 60,144

Languages
  - Official: Telugu
- Time zone: UTC+5:30 (IST)

Medikonduru mandal is one of the 18 mandals in Guntur district of the Indian state of Andhra Pradesh. The mandal is under the administration of Guntur revenue division and the headquarters are located at Medikonduru. It is located at a distance 20 km from the district headquarters.

== Demographics ==
As of 2011 census, the mandal had a population of 60,144. The total population constitute, 30682 males and 29462 females with a sex ratio of 976 females per 1000 males. 6912 children are in the age group of 0–6 years.

== Towns and villages ==
As of 2011 census, the mandal has 12 villages. The settlements in the mandal are listed below:

1. Dokiparru
2. Mandapadu
3. Mangalagiripadu
4. Medikonduru
5. Paladugu
6. Perecherla
7. Potlapadu
8. Siripuram
9. Varagani
10. Velavarthipadu
11. Visadala

== Administration ==
The mandal is under the control of a tahsildar and the present tahsildar is P. Jaganmohan Rao. Medikonduru mandal is one of the 5 mandals under Assembly constituency, which in turn represents Tadikona Assembly of Andhra Pradesh.

== See also ==
- List of mandals in Andhra Pradesh
- Villages in Atchampet mandal
