= Diocese of Nellore =

Roman Catholic diocese in Andhra Pradesh, India

Coordinates: 14.4573°N 79.9847°E

Diocese of Nellore Dioecesis Nellorensis

Location
- Country: India
- Ecclesiastical province: Visakhapatnam
- Metropolitan: Visakhapatnam

Statistics
- Area: 30,800 km^{2} (11,900 sq mi)
- Population: Total; Catholics: (as of 2004); 6,601,312; 79,765 (1.2%)

Information
- Rite: Latin Rite
- Established: 3 July 1928
- Cathedral: St Joseph’s Cathedral in Nellore

Current leadership
- Pope: Leo XIV
- Bishop: Doraboina Moses Prakasam
- Metropolitan Archbishop: Prakash Mallavarapu
- Coadjutor: Anthony Dhass Pilli

The Roman Catholic Diocese of Nellore (Latin: Nelloren(sis)) is a diocese located in the city of Nellore in the ecclesiastical province of Visakhapatnam in India.

== History ==
- 3 July 1928: Established as Diocese of Nellore from the Metropolitan Archdiocese of Madras

== Leadership ==
- Bishops of Nellore (Latin Rite)
  - Bishop Doraboina Moses Prakasam (7 December 2006 – present)
  - Bishop Prakash Mallavarapup (Apostolic Administrator 22 October 2005 – 7 December 2006)
  - Bishop Pudhota Chinniah Balaswamy (17 December 1973 – 7 December 2006)
  - Bishop Bala Shoury Thumma (16 March 1970 – 4 August 1973)
  - Bishop William Bouter, M.H.M. (28 May 1929 – 16 March 1970)
