= Diocese of Eluru =

Roman Catholic diocese in Andhra Pradesh, India

Coordinates: 16.7143°N 81.0849°E

Diocese of Eluru Dioecesis Eluruensis ఏలూరు డియోసెస్

Location
- Country: India
- Ecclesiastical province: Visakhapatnam
- Metropolitan: Visakhapatnam

Statistics
- Area: 6,880 km^{2} (2,660 sq mi)
- Population: Total; Catholics: (as of 2006); 7,867,781; 281,531 (3.6%)

Information
- Denomination: Roman Catholic
- Sui iuris church: Latin Church
- Rite: Roman Rite
- Established: 9 December 1976
- Cathedral: Amalodbhavi Cathedral in Eluru

Current leadership
- Pope: Leo XIV
- Bishop: Jaya Rao Polimera
- Metropolitan Archbishop: Prakash Mallavarapu

The Diocese of Eluru comprises parts of Eluru district, Konaseema district, and West Godavari district in Andhra Pradesh, India. This territory was formed from the Roman Catholic Diocese of Vijayawada and was erected into a Diocese by Pope Paul VI on 9 December 1976.

== Bishops ==
- John Mulagada (5 May 1977 – 16 August 2009)
- Jaya Rao Polimera (25 July 2013–present)

== Saints and causes for canonisation ==
- Servant of God Fr. Silvio Pasquali, PIME
