= Pudhota Chinniah Balaswamy =

Indian bishop (1928-2009)

Pudhota Chinnaiah Balaswamy
- Born: 10 October 1928; Valarpuram
- Died: 24 September 2009 (aged 80)
- Occupation: bishop

Pudhota Chinniah Balaswamy (10 October 1928 – 24 September 2009) was the Indian bishop of the Roman Catholic Diocese of Nellore, which is based in the city of Nellore. Bishop Balaswamy served as the Bishop of Nellore from 17 December 1973, until his retirement on 7 December 2006.

Bishop Pudhota Chinniah Balaswamy was born in Valarpuram and ordained a Roman Catholic priest on 24 April 1955. He died on 24 September 2009, at the age of 81.
