= Peda Avutapalle railway station =

Railway station in Andhra Pradesh, India

Pedda Avutapale

General information
- Location: Pedda Avutapale, Krishna district, Andhra Pradesh; India
- Coordinates: 16°33′45″N 80°50′24″E
- Elevation: 22 m (72 ft)
- System: Indian Railways station
- Owner: Indian Railways
- Operator: South Central Railway
- Line: Visakhapatnam–Vijayawada section of Howrah–Chennai main line
- Platforms: 2, side platforms are gravel
- Tracks: 2 5 ft 6 in (1,676 mm) broad gauge

Construction
- Structure type: Standard (on ground station)
- Parking: Not available

Other information
- Station code: PAVP
- Division(s): Vijayawada

History
- Electrified: 1995–96
Location
- Location within Andhra Pradesh Location within India
- Interactive map

Pedda Avutapale railway station (station code:PAVP) is an Indian Railways station in Peda Avutapalle village of Andhra Pradesh. It lies on the Vijayawada–Nidadavolu loop line of Howrah–Chennai main line and is administered under Vijayawada railway division of South Central Railway zone. Eight trains halt at the station each day.

== History ==
Between 1893 and 1896, 1,288 km (800 mi) of the East Coast State Railway, between Vijayawada and Cuttack, was opened for traffic. The southern part of the East Coast State Railway (from Waltair to Vijayawada) was taken over by Madras Railway in 1901.

== Electrification ==
The Mustabad–Gannavaram–Nuzvid–Bhimadolu sector was electrified in 1995–96.

== Classification ==
Peda Avutapalle railway station is categorized as a Non-Suburban Grade-6 (NSG-6) station in the Vijayawada railway division.

Preceding station	Indian Railways	Following station
Telaprolu towards ?	South Central Railway zone Visakhapatnam–Vijayawada section of Howrah–Chennai main line	Gannavaram towards ?
