= Prasadampadu =

- Neighbourhood
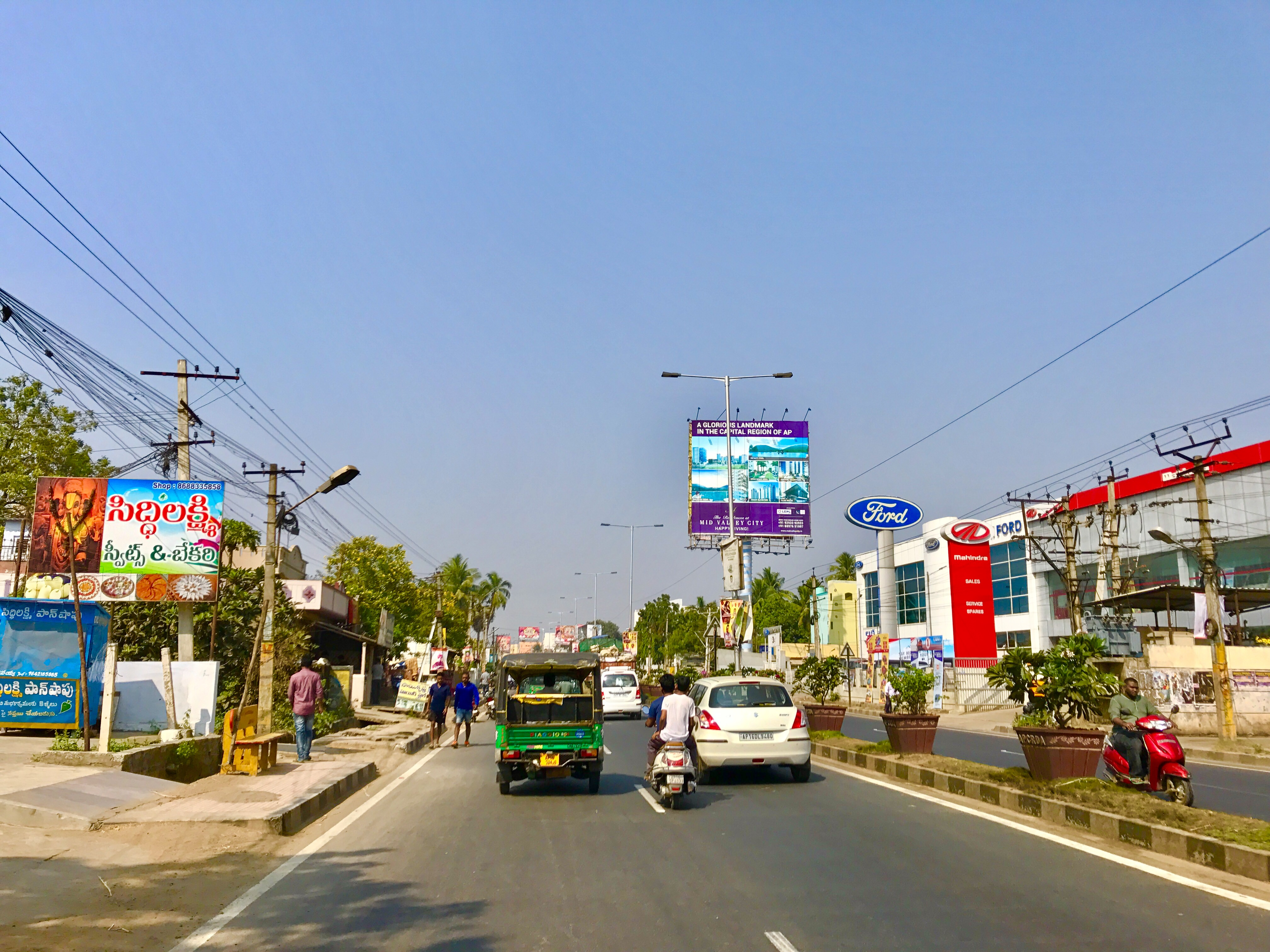
- AH-45 in Prasadampadu

- Location within Andhra Pradesh
- Coordinates: 16°31′10″N 80°41′21″E
- Country: India
- State: Andhra Pradesh
- Region: Coastal Andhra
- District: NTR
- Mandal: Vijayawada Rural mandal
- City: Vijayawada
- Metropolitan Area: Andhra Pradesh Capital Region

Area
  - Total: 2.40 km^{2} (0.93 sq mi)
- Elevation: 21 m (69 ft)

Population (2011)
  - Total: 13,941
  - Density: 5,810/km^{2} (15,000/sq mi)
- Time zone: UTC+5:30 (IST)
- PIN: 521108
- Telephone code: +91-866

Prasadampadu is a part of Vijayawada in NTR district of the Indian state of Andhra Pradesh. It is located in Vijayawada (rural) mandal of Vijayawada revenue division. As per the G.O. No. M.S.104 (dated:23-03-2017), Municipal Administration and Urban Development Department, it became a part of Vijayawada metropolitan area.

== See also ==
- List of census towns in Andhra Pradesh
