= Joseph Raja Rao =

Indian Roman Catholic prelate (born 1952)

Bishop Thelagathoti Joseph Raja Rao, SMM Bishop - in - Vijayawada
- The Right Reverend
- Church: Catholic Church (Societas Mariae Monfortana)
- Diocese: Vijayawada
- Appointed: December 19, 2015
- In office: 2015-
- Predecessor: Prakash Mallavarapu, RCM
- Successor: Incumbent
- Previous posts: Secretary General and Procurator General of Congregation, Rome (2011-2015)

Orders
- Ordination: June 7, 1980
- Consecration: February 2, 2016 by Salvatore Pennacchio, Thumma Bala, Prakash Mallavarapu
- Rank: Bishop

Personal details
- Born: March 8, 1952 (age 74) Pedda Avutapalli, Krishna district, AP
- Parents: Smt. Kamalamma and Sri T. Prabhudas
- Occupation: Priesthood

Telagathoti Joseph Raja Rao, SMM, is a Roman Catholic prelate; he has been the Bishop in the Diocese of Vijayawada, since 2016.

He was born on 8 March 1952 (in some sources his native name comes last, and in other media sources it's usually omitted). He took Solemn Vows on 31 January 1980 as a Member of Missionaries of the Company of Mary, and on 7 June 1980 was Ordained a Priest in that order. On 19 December 2015, Pope Francis appointed him as Bishop of Vijayawada, India, and on 2 February 2016, he was Ordained Bishop.

As the bishop whose jurisdiction includes a major Catholic shrine, since 2016, Raja Rao has led the annual festival that celebrates Mary Matha in Vijaywada. Raja Rao led the Mass for the annual Gunadala shrine festival in 2023. The prior year's festival had been cancelled due to the Covid-19 pandemic. In 2024, Bishop Raja Rao participated in the celebrations marking the centenary of the Gunadala Mother Mary Shrine in Vijayawada. He also participated in the 2025 Jubilee festivities.

Raja Rao is ex officio a member of the board of the St. John's Regional Seminary.
