= Peda Avutapalli =

- Village
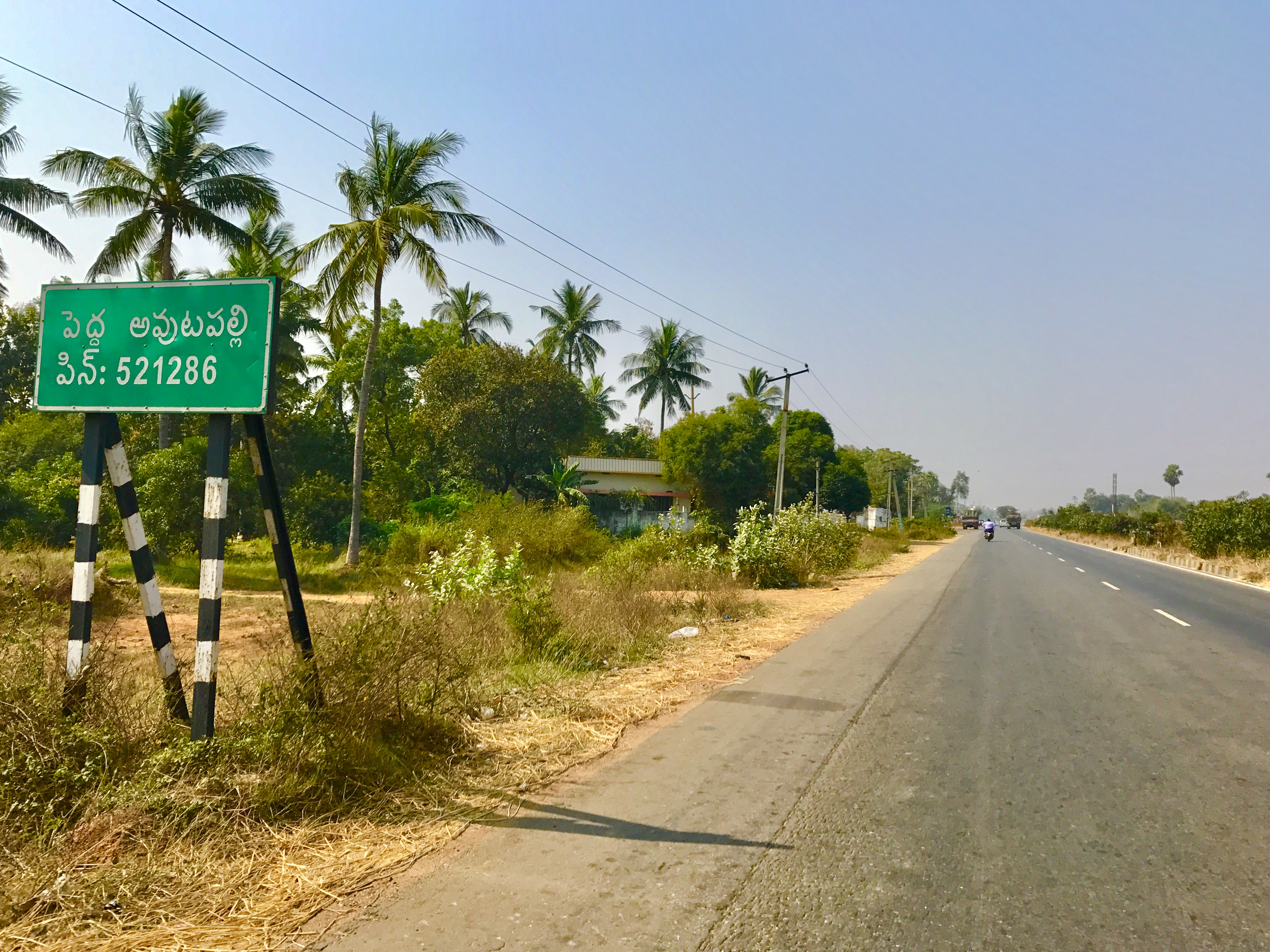
- Peda Avutapalli Board
- Interactive map of Peda Avutapalli
- Location in Andhra Pradesh, India Peda Avutapalli (India)
- Coordinates: 16.558718°N 80.839629°E
- Country: India
- State: Andhra Pradesh
- District: Krishna

Government
  - Body: Gram Panchayat

Population (2011)
  - Total: 7,537

Languages
  - Official: Telugu
- Time zone: UTC+5:30 (IST)

Peda Avutapalli is a developing town in Unguturu mandal, Krishna district, Andhra Pradesh, India. It is located 7.5 km from the Vijayawada Airport (Gannavaram Airport). Comes under Gannavaram constituency, Current MLA Yarlagadda Venkata Rao(TDP).

== Demographics ==
As of 2011 Census of India, Peda Avutapalle town has population of 7537 of which 3648 are males while 3889 are females. Average Sex Ratio of Peda Avutapalli town is 1066 which is higher than Andhra Pradesh state average of 993. Population of children with age 0-6 is 679 which makes up 9.01 % of total population of town. Child Sex Ratio for the Peda Avutapalli as per census is 850, lower than Andhra Pradesh average of 939. Literacy rate of Peda Avutapalli town was 74.26 % compared to 67.02 % of Andhra Pradesh.

== Economy ==
The town's main source of income is non-agriculture, other industries include ceramics and plastics, paper and oil mills.

== Transport ==
Peda Avutapalli is well connected by road. Asian Highway 45 runs through the town. APS RTC operates bus services from Vijayawada to pedda avutapalli 201C Vijayawada, Eluru and Gannavaram to this town. Peda Avutapalli railway station serves the town.
