= Veeravalli =

Veravalli is a village in the Indian state of Andhra Pradesh. It is located in Krishna district.

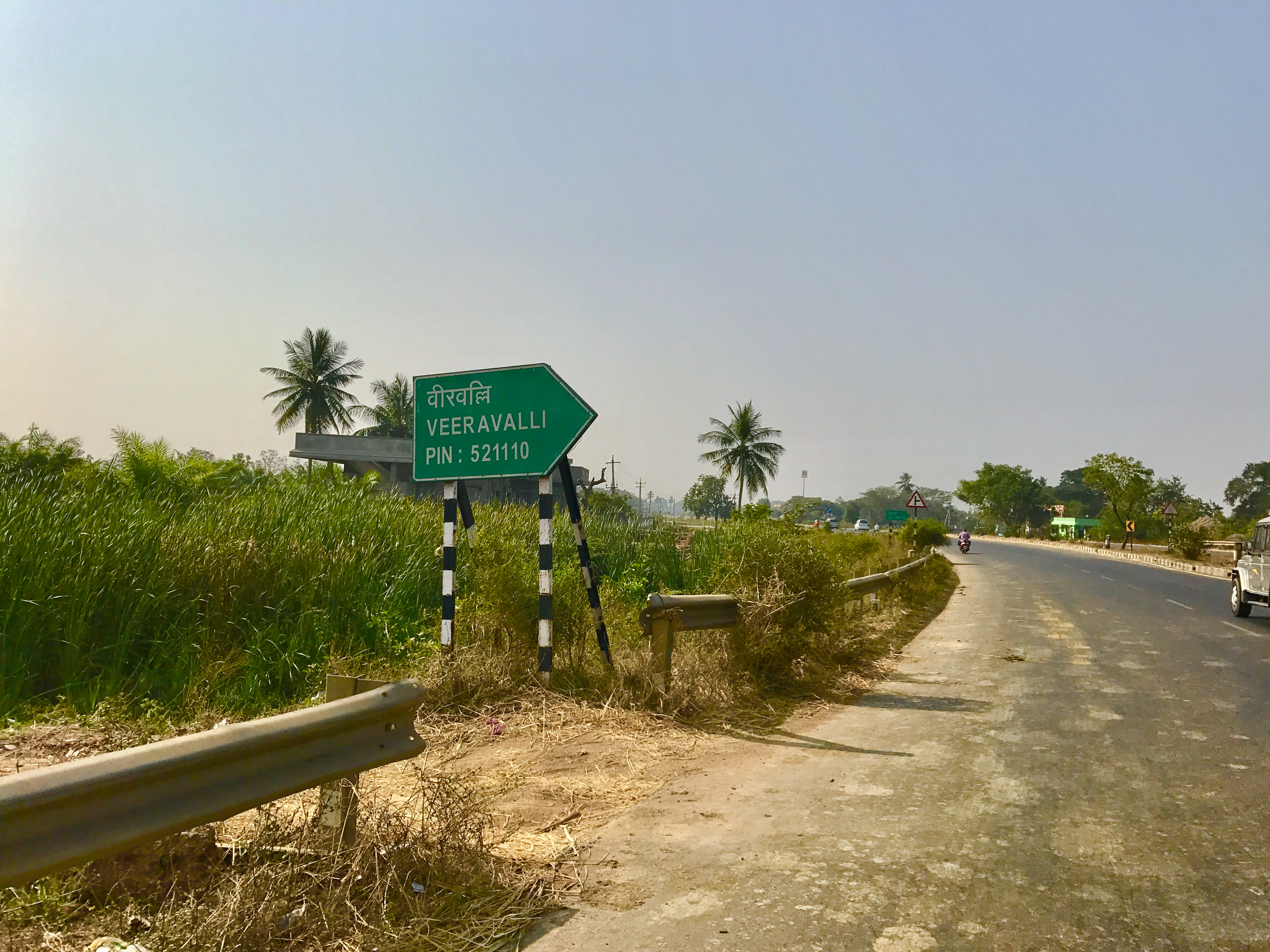
Veravalli sign board on AH-45
