= Thurakapalem =

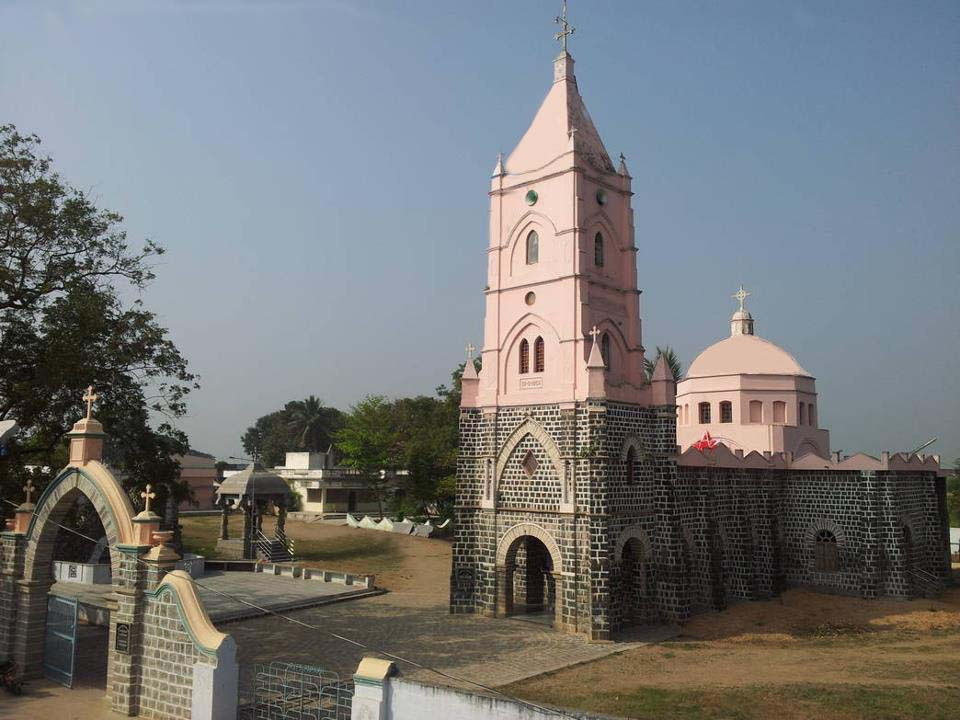
- Interactive map of Thurakapalem
- Location in Andhra Pradesh, India Thurakapalem (India)
- Coordinates: 16°19′50″N 80°3′53″E
- Country: India
- State: Andhra Pradesh
- District: Guntur
- Taluka: Sattenapalli
- Mandal: Muppalla

Government
  - Sarpanch: Sri Mallavarapu Chandra Sekhar Pratap.
  - Village Revenue Officer: Sri
  - Village Revenue Asst.: Sri

Population (2011)
  - Total: 1,400

Languages
  - Official: Telugu
- Time zone: UTC+5:30 (IST)
- PIN: 522 408
- Telephone code: 91 8641
- Vehicle registration: AP 39 & AP 40
- Literacy: 99%

thumb

Thurakapalem is a village located in Muppalla mandal of Palnadu district in the state of Andhra Pradesh, India This village falls under the jurisdiction of Sattenapalli Assembly Constituency and Narasaraopet Parliamentary Constituency.

== History ==
Thurakapalem was founded around 1840. Many families left Gandikota to escape Muslim aggression in that region, and settled in Guntur district. These families, called Gandikota Kammas, originally practiced Hinduism, but converted to Roman Catholicism 50 years later with the arrival of the Irish ( Mill Hill) missionaries to the Guntur district around 1890.

== Geography ==
Thurakapalem is located at 16.330°N 80.066°E. It has an average elevation of 59 meters (194 ft) above sea level and is situated in the plains. It covers an area of approximately 800 acres and is located approximately 62 miles (100 km) to the west of the Bay of Bengal. This area is considered rich with fertile, arable land irrigated by canals. The type of soil is predominantly black cotton soil known as "nalla regadi boomi" in Telugu.

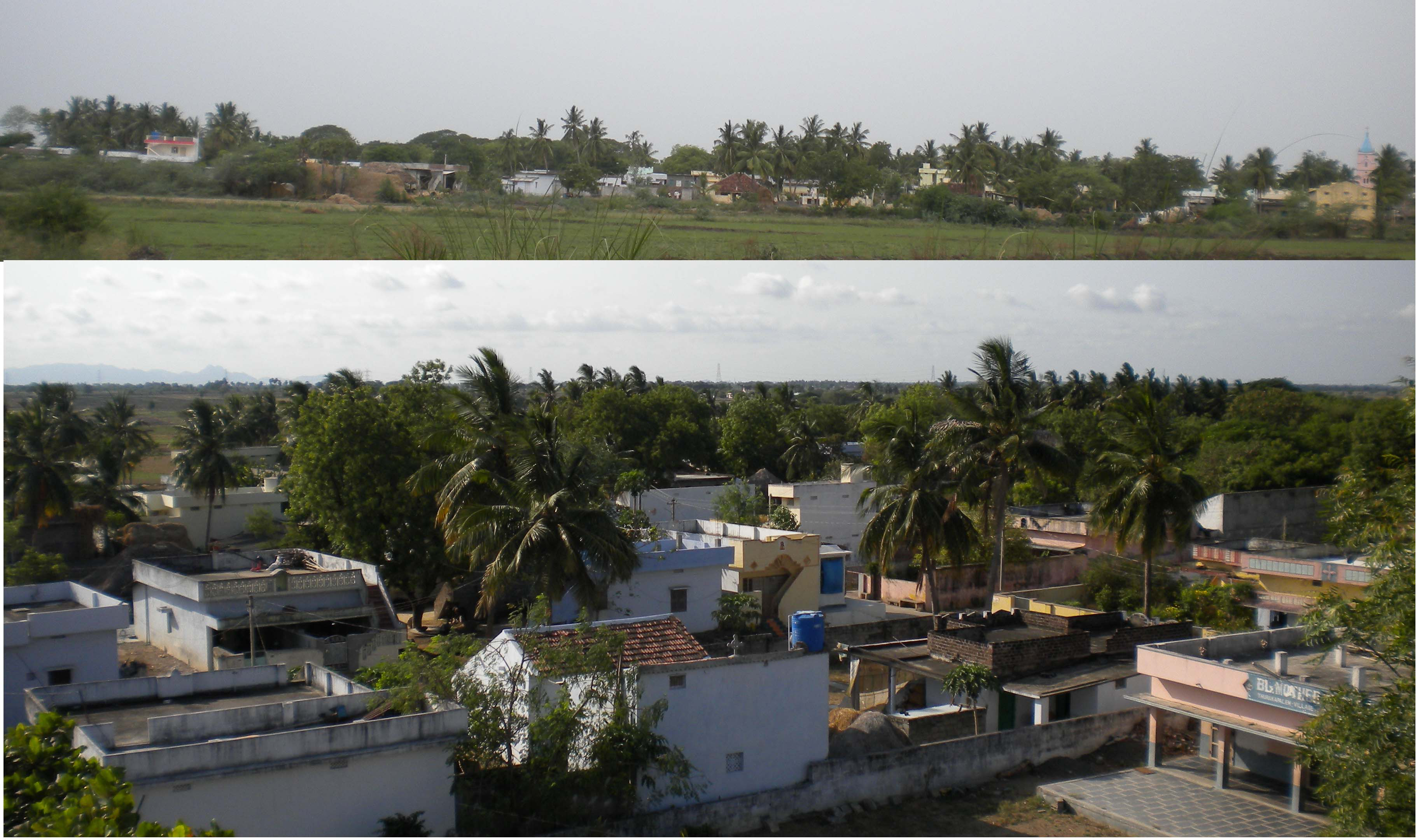
An East and West view of the Village.

The area generally has a warm, dry climate with extremely hot summers. The year may be divided into four climatic seasons: a dry and cool winter season (December to February), the summer season (March to May), the southwest monsoon season (June to September), and the post-monsoon, or retreating monsoon season (October to November). The temperature reaches 48 °C (118 °F) in the summer, falling to 18.6 °C (65.5 °F) in the winter. The yearly average temperature is 27 °C (81 °F).

Storms and depressions originating in the Bay of Bengal cross the district from the east. These cause widespread and very heavy rains and strong winds, mainly during the seasons of the southwest monsoon and the retreating monsoon. October is the wettest month of the year.

== Demography ==
The population of Thurakapalem (as of the 2011 India census) is 1,400. The main religion practiced is Roman Catholicism, with a few Hindus also residing in the village. Males and females each constitute approximately 50 per cent of the population. The village has an average literacy rate of 99 percent, with male literacy at 99 percent and female literacy at 96 percent. Ten percent of the population of Thurakapalem is under six years of age.. Several residents of the village migrated to towns and cities and also settled abroad.

== Culture ==
The spoken language of Thurakapalem is Telugu. The traditional clothing consists of sari for women and pancha, lungi, or uttariya for men. Until 1940, Thurkapalem, as a part of the Guntur District, fell under the Catholic Diocese of Nellore. On 23 February 1940, Guntur split from the Diocese of Nellore and became a diocese in its own right, the Diocese of Guntur, led by its first bishop, Thomas Pothacamury.
