= Gnanapuram =

- Neighbourhood
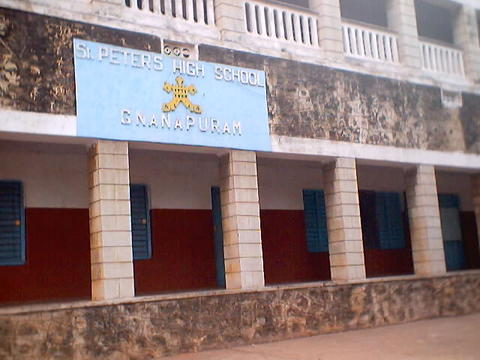

- Location in Visakhapatnam
- Coordinates: 17.720132°N 83.286241°E
- Country: India
- State: Andhra Pradesh
- District: Visakhapatnam

Government
  - Body: Greater Visakhapatnam Municipal Corporation

Languages
  - Official: Telugu
- Time zone: UTC+5:30 (IST)
- PIN: 530004
- Vehicle registration: AP

Gnanapuram is a residential area in Visakhapatnam, Andhra Pradesh.

== History ==
Gnanapuram is supposed to be the ancient neighbourhood of the city. It was founded sometime in 1880 by the Salesians, whose first Bishop was Right Reverend Tissot. The Roman Catholic Mission, the church, educational institutions, and the economy prevailed in the 1880s and beyond.

== School ==
Gnanapuram is served by the historic St. Peter's High School, a Telugu school with state curriculum (SSC) of Andhra Pradesh. This school also has its primary school division at the same location (Gnanapuram, Visakhapatnam).

== Transport ==
Gnanapuram is served by Visakhapatnam Railway Station to the east.

Bus services to Gajuwaka and Kancharapalem run from Convent Junction, a historic junction in the south-east corner.
