= Siripuram, Guntur district =

Siripuram
- Village
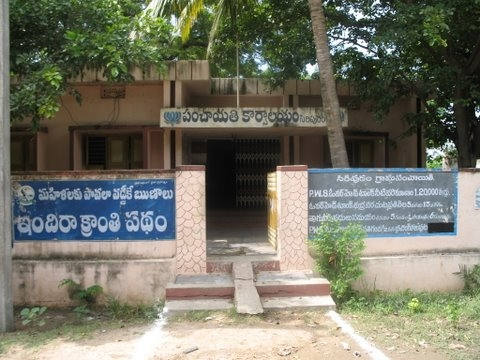
- Gram panchayat office in Siripuram
- Interactive map of Siripuram
- Location in Andhra Pradesh, India
- Coordinates: 16°24′26″N 80°17′49″E
- Country: India
- State: Andhra Pradesh
- District: Guntur
- Mandal: Medikonduru

Government
  - Type: Panchayati raj
  - Body: Siripuram Gram panchayat

Area
  - Total: 1,641 ha (4,050 acres)

Population (2011)
  - Total: 8,766
  - Density: 534.2/km^{2} (1,384/sq mi)

Languages
  - Official: Telugu
- Time zone: UTC+5:30 (IST)
- PIN: 522401
- Area code: +91–863
- Vehicle registration: AP

Siripuram is a village in the Guntur district of the Indian state of Andhra Pradesh. It is located in the Medikonduru mandal of Guntur revenue division.

== Geography ==
Siripuram is situated to the north of the mandal headquarters, Medikonduru, at 16.18°N 80.29°E. It is spread over an area of 1,641 ha (4,050 acres).

== Governance ==
Siripuram Gram panchayat is the local self-government of the village. It is divided into wards and each ward is represented by a ward member. The village forms a part of Andhra Pradesh Capital Region and is under the jurisdiction of APCRDA.

Siripuram is mentioned in the previous studies regarding governance in the 12th century:

Velanati Chodas took a keen interest in excavating tanks and digging canals. Many tanks were dedicated to temples. In Talagadadivi the paddy and sugarcane fields were said to have been abundant with water by tanks in the vicinity. Velanati Choda-II constructed three tanks, one at Siripuram and two at Marripundi in Ungini-marga to a temple. An inscription from Mandapadu, Guntur district, dated 1168 A.D., belonging to the Velanati Rajendra Choda-II, mentions tanks, viz., Prolinayaka cheruvu, Karanam maraya cheruvu, Kotta cheruvu, Narayana cheruvu and a tank (name not mentioned).

=== Historical significance ===
On a stone in front of a ruined temple near the tank in Siripuram is an inscription from A. D. 1165 relating how the Chalukya Kingdom passed into the hands of the Chola kings. Adjoining the village of Patibandla is a mass of black rock crowned by temples said to have been built circa A. D. An inscription in Telugu records that Kondarnanidu, son of Gopapatrudu, on horseback crossed over the rock from west to east. The neighboring villages of Jellil-puram and Musapuram took their names from two Muhammadan jagirdars, Jellil Khan and Musa Khan.

== Education ==
As per the school information report for the academic year 2018–19, the village has a total of 13 schools. These include eight Zilla Parishad/MPP and five private schools.

== See also ==
- List of villages in Guntur district
