= Mutluru =

Coordinates: 16°09′N 80°29′E

Mutluru is one of the largest villages in the Guntur district in Andhra Pradesh, India. It has a population of around 7806 as of 2014 and is part of the Vatticherukuru mandal area. Mutluru is south of Guntur, the district's capital. Politically, it comes under Prathipadu constituency.

It's one of the pilgrim places in Mutlur. Every year on 3 December, St. Xavier's feast is celebrated. People from all over the state come to the village to receive the blessings of St. Xavier.
