= Siripuram, Nalgonda district =

Siripuram siriconagaram
- village
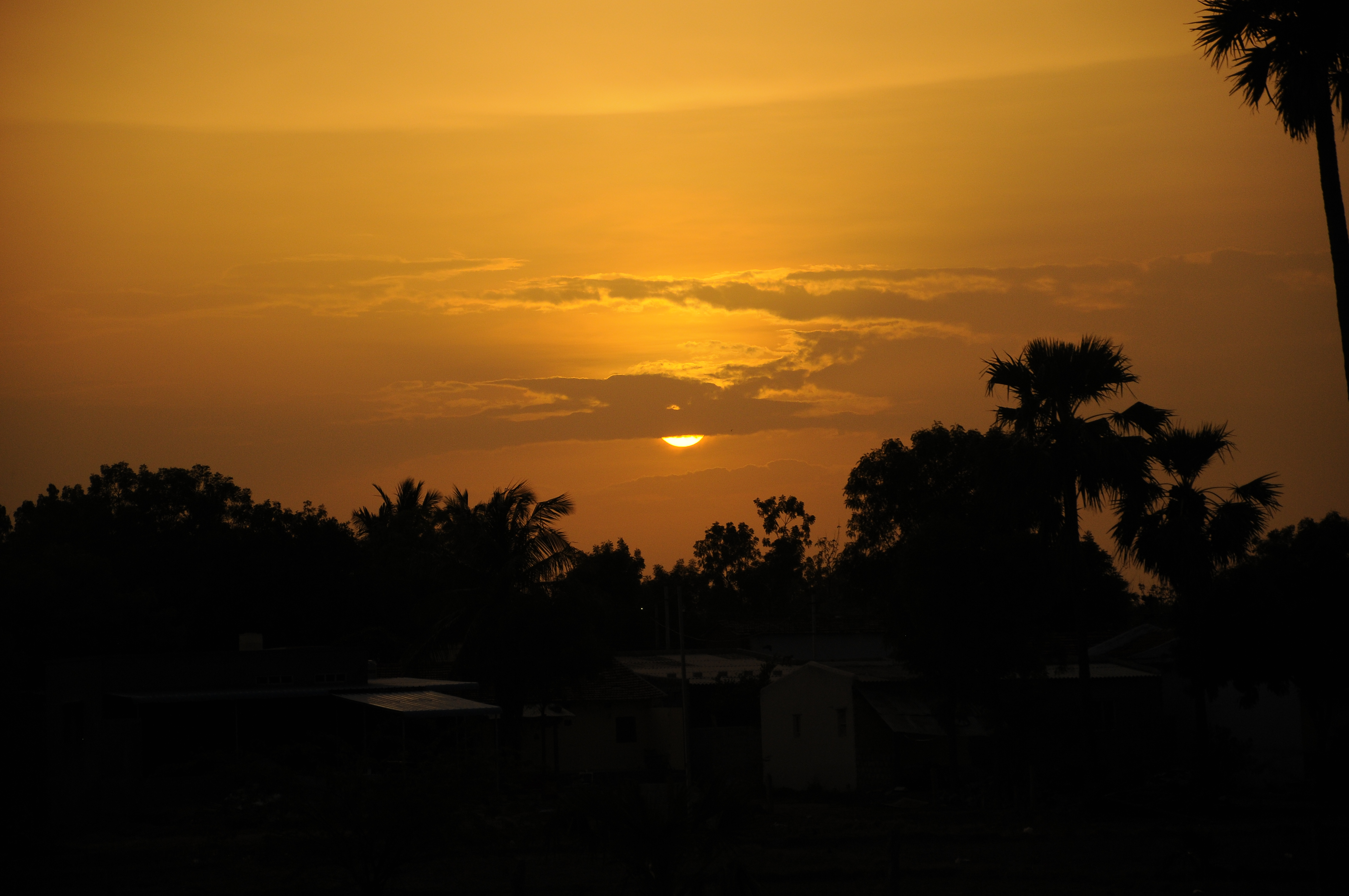
- Sunset in Siripuram

- Location in Telangana, India Siripuram (India)
- Coordinates: 17.0600°N 79.3°E
- Country: India
- State: ramannapeta mandal
- District: yadadri bhongir district
- Founder: Mallesh Silveru
- Named for: ikats
- Elevation: 17.0700 m (56.004 ft)

Languages
  - Official: Telugu
- Time zone: UTC+5:30 (IST)
- PIN: 508113
- Telephone code: 08694

Siripuram is a village and a gram panchayat of Ramannapet Mandal, Nalgonda District, in Telangana state in India. (Pincode Telangana 508113). It is 71 km from Hyderabad.

(There is also a Siripuram village in Andhra Pradesh India - pincode 522401).

Siripuram is known for its textile industries. Nearly 60% of the people are employed as weavers, or textile dyeing workers. Siripuram is the place of a long-known traditional weaving process called ikat. Ikat is a term that means "Poetry of the Loom." It is recognizable by its geometric patterns and blurry lines. The main agricultural resources are cotton and wheat.

== History ==
- The original residents (the Padmashali weavers community) named the village Siriconagaram (Siri-Gold, Nagaram-village or city), in their words "sirilu Unna nagaram". They chose this name as they considered their threads as their gold. Since then many people have migrated and settled here.
- The Nizams ruled the village of Siripuram and the last Nizam to rule Siripuram was Aurangzeb. Though the Nizams continue to rule Hyderabad, they no longer have control over Siripuram. The Communist Party leaders helped the people of Siripuram to rule out Nizams.
- Ikat is identified to be in existence since the 5th century through the sculptures of ajantha caves. The exact origin of Ikat in Telangana is unrecorded but the people of Siripuram claim to have been weaving Ikats for the past 150 to 200 years. The women of Hyderabad considered wearing ikat as a show of prestige and grandeur.

== Facilities ==
There are four Schools in Siripuram - Nethaji High School, Zphs Siripuram, Zilla Parishat High School and Nethaji Primary School.

Siripuram has two hospitals, Siripuram Panchayath and Vijaya Clinic Siripuram.

It also has two restaurants and a hotel.

== Travel ==
By train - there are three trains from Hyderabad.

- Janmabumi express
- Narayanadri express
- Falaknuma express

The nearest railway station to Siripuram is Ramannapeta (5.2 km away)

By bus - Imlibun bus stand to Choutuppal. Then Choutuppal to Siripuram. The nearest bus station is Siripuram bus stand.

Nearest airports

- Rajiv Gandhi International Airport
- Begumpet Airport

== Demographics ==
Siripuram 2011 Census Details

Total Population 4379

Total No of Houses 1144

Female Population 49.9% (2187)

Total Literacy rate 61.5% (2692)

Female Literacy rate 25.7% (1125)

Scheduled Tribes Population 1.0% (42)

Scheduled Caste Population 9.6% (421)

Working Population 49.0%

Child (age 0-6) Population 377

Girl Child (age 0-6) Population 47.2% (178)

The local Language is Telugu.

== Culture ==
- Most of the population of Siripuram are Hindu.
- There are four temples in the village as well as one mosque.
- Goddesses Yellamma and Uppalamma are prayed every day for good fortune.
- Varunadeva (god of rain) is also paid homage to. The ladies of the washer community hold a frog, tie it in a cloth to a stick along with some neem leaves and flowers. They carry this frog to every house and ask the lady of the house to shower the frog with water. They believe that Varunadeva will be pleased and shower them with rains and keep their washing profession alive. After it rains, they marry the frog with another and complete their tradition.

== Artisans ==
Of the village’s more than 4,500 residents, about 2,000 work as weavers. Twenty of the weaver families are Muslim, while the remaining families are Padmashali Hindus. Both men and women take part in tasks such as weaving, warping, spooling, spinning, tying, and dyeing. The village has approximately 30 master weavers, although only a small number of artisans work and sell their products independently. Not all artisans weave; of the roughly 2,000 people involved, about 400 are directly engaged in weaving.

=== Sahukars ===
Sahukars who are the middlemen selling the products woven by the weavers to different people using different media. There are nearly 30 sahukars in the village and 20 of them export their ikat products to different parts of India like Odisha, Jharkhand and other eastern states. The sahukars place an order to the artisans according to the market demand. They then agree to pay a fixed amount of price for a product and pays some of the amounts in advance, and then pay them in full according to the design after the product is developed. They may also work as moneylenders.

Some sahukars have the entire process unit under their control or they just pay local artisans to work for them. Most of them are paid in cash when they work under a sahukar.

=== Society ===
Society is the help center for the weavers and artisans of the Padmashali community. People of other castes are not allowed to be a part of this society. Society usually takes product orders for the government, sources the yarns from the government body called NHDC (National Handloom Development Corporation), and then pays the workers to work for the government. The yarns are sourced from NHDC and are then distributed to the weavers according to the order size.

== Government schemes for weavers ==
- The government provided weavers with geo-tags. Karvy institutions took a survey of all the weavers who own looms and provided the government with the survey results and the weavers with the looms received geo tag. Not all the weavers are provided with geo tags - in the village with 2,000 weavers, only 201 people with looms received geo tags; other artisans who spin who warp who dye who tie who design are not considered under this geo tag program.
- The people with geo tags are supposed to get a subsidy from the government; if they buy their yarn from NHDC [National Handloom Development Corporation] they receive a 10% of discount if they buy the aliens directly from NHDC. Two people from a family can get the subsidy under one geo tag.
- People with geo tags can also register on another government authorised program called the thrift fund. The people who register under geo tag can deposit their money in the savings account and if they provide 8% of their total earnings to declare recurring deposit the government will provide them with double the savings they have placed in the AD [Assistant Director] account in they can withdraw the amount after 3 years period. Not all of the weavers with tags use the facilities that are provided, with only 170 out of 201 Weavers using the geo tag, thrift fund facility.
- Previously they were provided with insurance and health card through the ICICI Lombard scheme wherein they were provided with the health cards if they paid 7,500 rupees a year period. There was also a MGBBY scheme [Mahatma Gandhi Bhunkar Bima Yojana] where they were provided with Life Insurance worth 500,000 rupees; they have to pay 80 rupees per head to avail this Yojana. All the schemes were later removed by the central government. The unregistered weavers do not get any subsidy or any help from the government or the society.

== Fabric Designing and process ==
Most of the fabrics woven are for the home décor market, but dress material and chunni are also woven. Some of the motifs and designs found in Siripuram Ikat are: Geethalu, Pan patola, Rajasthan, Mamidipinde, Malle rekha, Malle mogga, Kota komma, Jaggu, Indhradhanasu, Chakram, Kaya, Pedha kaya, Chinna kaya, diamond, etc. They use bright colors and sometimes they use darker colors according to the market demand. The weavers use white weft to tone down the colors of the warp. The designs are given by the market to the Society and Sahukars who pass on the design to the artisans. Very few artisans get the privilege of designing their own fabrics and carrying out their own business at market.

=== Process ===
Warping - Warping is done on the "addas". This is known as drum warping. First the artisans used hanks of yarn but now they use cone. This is a very old technique. In one complete circle of the ‘adda’ 25 meters length of yarn is warped. If the yarn is warped on the ‘adda’ for one hour, there are 140 ‘koliki’, that is, 140 counts, that is, 280 threads.

The yarns are then dried by the technique of street spreading. The village is planned in a linear way because of this process only.

Weft preparation - The yarn is rotated on a charkha so that it gets transferred to the shuttle and then it goes for weaving. Usually the females of the family help the artisans to do this.

Designing - The designs are made on the graph papers. One box on the graph denotes six yarns. Nowadays, for warp direction ikat, no graph paper is used because the artisans are so skilled that they can imagine the design and without any rough draft can start the tying and dyeing.

Tying - Once the designing is over, the artisan moves to tying. The yarns are spread evenly and stretched in the room. Then, with the help of a ruler they mark the parts on the yarns which are to be tied. With the help of rubber strips from cycle tires, they tie the yarns tightly so that those portions are resisted and the dye does not penetrate that area. For very fine designs, they tie cotton yarns very tightly around the area which has to be resisted.

Dyeing - Once the bundle of yarns is tied, they are sent for dyeing. Most of the artisans, who tie the yarns also dye them. They use chemical dyes, like naphthol dye. They use caustic soda, TR and the color to dye the yarn. First, it is dipped in a soap solution and then it is dipped in the dye. The yarns are tied and dyed multiple times depending on the design.

Weaving - The dyed yarns are then sent to the weavers. The weavers dent the yarns in the loom and then start the weaving. They mostly use pit looms made of teak wood for weaving. They use plain weave, that is, one up and one down. They use temple to maintain the evenness of the width of the fabric. They also use wax to smoothen the thread movement. They are mostly applied to the selvedges of the fabric. Wax is mostly used for red and yellow dyed yarn because they are coarser than others.
