= Ravipadu =

Ravipadu may refer to:

== Andhra Pradesh, India ==
- Ravipadu, Narasaraopet mandal, a village in the Narasaraopet mandal, Guntur district, Andhra Pradesh, India
- Ravipadu, Pedanandipadu mandal, a village in the Pedanandipadu mandal, Guntur District, Andhra Pradesh, India
- Ravipadu, Pentapadu mandal, a village in the Pentapadu mandal, West Godavari District, Andhra Pradesh, India

== Telangana, India ==
- Ravipadu, Bibinagar mandal, a village in the Bibinagar mandal, Nalgonda district, Telangana, India
