= Velpuru =

Velpuru Velpur
- Suburb
- Interactive map of Velpuru
- Location in Andhra Pradesh, India
- Coordinates: 16°29′44″N 80°45′33″E
- Country: India
- State: Andhra Pradesh
- District: Krishna
- Metro: Vijayawada Metropolitan Area
- City: Vijayawada
- Elevation: 18 m (59 ft)

Languages
  - Official: Telugu
- Time zone: UTC+5:30 (IST)
- Vidhan Sabha constituency: Penamaluru
- Lok Sabha constituency: Machillipatnam

Velpuru or Velpur is a suburb of Vijayawada in Krishna district in the state of Andhra Pradesh in India. Velpur is very close to the areas such as Gudavalli, Kesarpalle, Gannavaram.

== Demographics ==
The population of Velpuru as per 2011 census is about 22,768. The literacy rate is about 71%. The major sources of income and revenue for Velpur are agriculture and industrial factories nearby.

== History ==
Beginning in 1970, the initiatives taken up by Sri. Arimilli Venkata Ratnam, then village head has resulted medical, educational and recreational facilities in the village. Jainism flourished in Velpuru during the reign of Sada kings.
