= Archdiocese of Visakhapatnam =

Roman Catholic archdiocese in Andhra Pradesh, India

Coordinates: 17.7193°N 83.2846°E

Metropolitan Archdiocese of Visakhapatnam Archidioecesis Metropolitae Visakhapatnamensis విశాఖపట్నం మెట్రోపాలిటన్ ఆర్చ్ డియోసెస్

Location
- Country: India
- Ecclesiastical province: Visakhapatnam

Statistics
- Area: 25,950 km^{2} (10,020 sq mi)
- Population: Total; Catholics: (as of 2010); 12,640,684; 247,231 (2%)

Information
- Rite: Latin Rite
- Cathedral: St Peter’s Cathedral in Visakhapatnam
- Co-cathedral: St Anne’s Co-Cathedral in Visakhapatnam

Current leadership
- Pope: Leo XIV
- Metropolitan Archbishop: Udumala Bala Showreddy

The Roman Catholic Metropolitan Archdiocese of Visakhapatnam (Latin: Archdioecesis Metropolitae Visakhapatnamensis) is an archdiocese located in the city of Visakhapatnam in India.

== History ==
- 16 March 1845: Established as the Apostolic Pro-Vicariate of Vizagapatam from the Apostolic Vicariate of Madras
- 3 April 1850: Promoted as Apostolic Vicariate of Vizagapatam
- 1 September 1886: Promoted as Diocese of Vizagapatam
- 21 October 1950: Renamed as Diocese of Visakhapatnam
- 16 October 2001: Promoted as Metropolitan Archdiocese of Visakhapatnam

Claretian Missionary Fathers (CMF) entered the diocese in the year 1888. In 1845, Rome entrusted a vast area of Eastern and Central India to the MSFS, who set their headquarters in Visakhapatnam. The first group of MSFS landed on the East coast of India on 8 September 1845. The order of Friars Minor Capuchins. A novitiate was opened in India in 1922 thus planting the order in the Indian soil.

== Bishops ==
=== Pro-Vicars Apostolic ===
1. Fr. Jacques Henri Gailhot, (16 March 1845 – 1847)
2. Fr. Theophile Sebastian Neyret, M.S.F.S. (1847–1850); continued as Vicar Apostolic

=== Vicars Apostolic ===
1. Bishop Theophile Sebastian Neyret, M.S.F.S. (1850–1862)
2. Bishop Jean Marie Tissot, M.S.F.S. (1862–1886); continued as the first bishop

=== Bishops of Visakhapatnam (Vizagapatam until 1950) ===
1. Bishop Jean Marie Tissot, M.S.F.S. (1886–1890)
2. Bishop Jean-Marie Clerc, M.S.F.S. (1891–1926)
3. Bishop Pierre Rossillon, M.S.F.S. (1926–1947)
4. Bishop Joseph-Alphonse Baud, M.S.F.S. (1947–1966)
5. Bishop Ignatius Gopu, M.S.F.S. (1966–1981)
6. Bishop Kagithapu Mariadas, M.S.F.S. (1982–2001); continued as Archbishop

=== Metropolitan Archbishops of Visakhapatnam ===
1. Archbishop Kagithapu Mariadas, M.S.F.S. (2001–2012)
2. Archbishop Prakash Mallavarapu (2012–2024)
3. Archbishop Udumala Bala Showreddy (2025-Present)

== Suffragan dioceses ==
- Eluru
- Guntur
- Nellore
- Srikakulam
- Vijayawada

== Sources ==
- GCatholic.org ^{[self-published]}
- Catholic Hierarchy ^{[self-published]}
- Official Website of the Archdiocese of Visakhapatnam
