= Nunna =

- Neighborhood
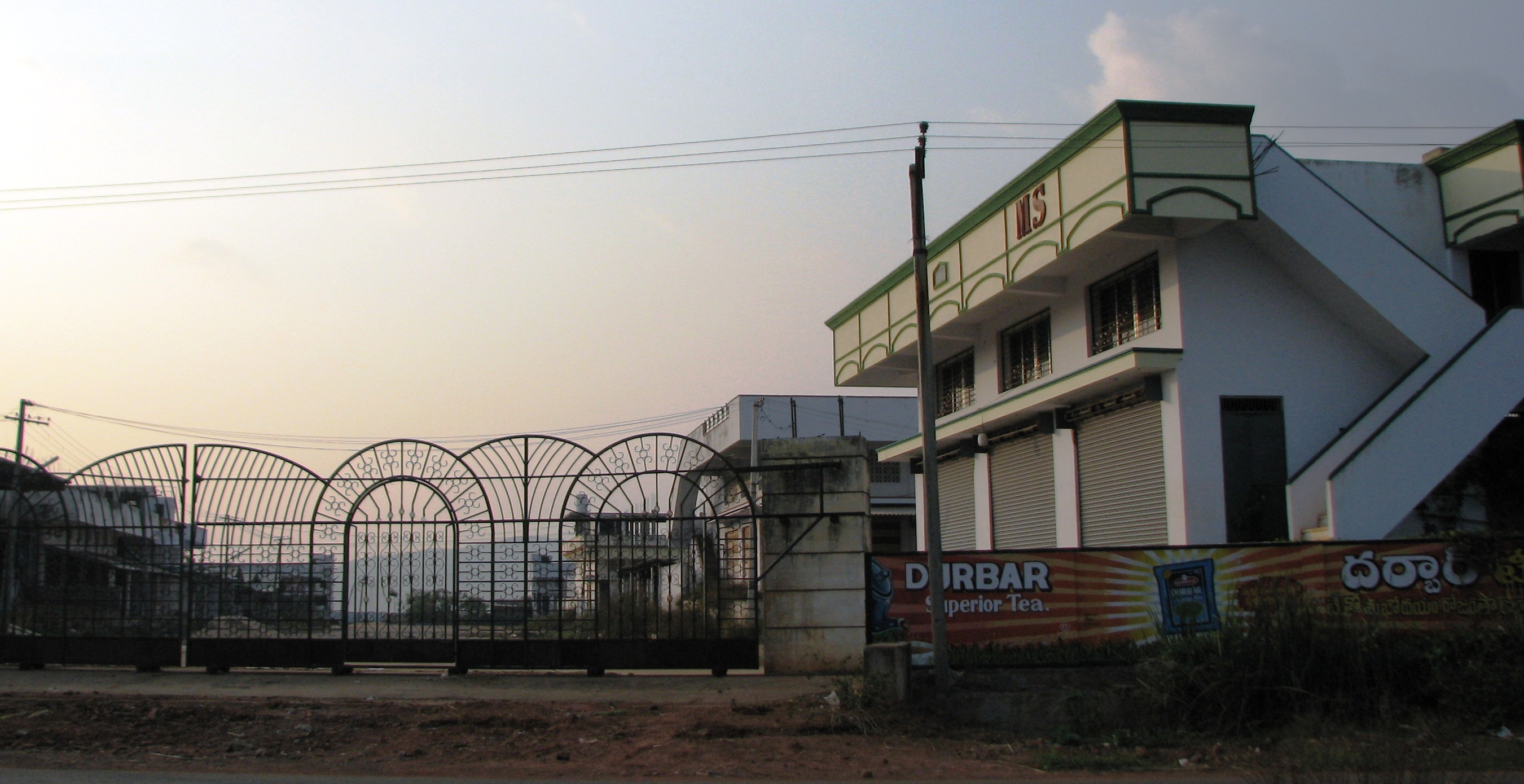
- mango market located at the nunna neighbourhood

- Location in Andhra Pradesh, India
- Coordinates: 16.5763°N 80.6854°E
- Country: India
- State: Andhra Pradesh
- District: NTR
- Mandal: Vijayawada (rural)

Population (2011)
  - Total: 14,176

Languages
  - Official: Telugu
- Time zone: UTC+5:30 (IST)
- PIN: 521212
- Telephone code: 0866
- Vehicle registration: AP–16
- Lok Sabha constituency: Machilipatnam
- Vidhan Sabha constituency: Gannavaram

Nunna is a major Neighbourhood of Vijayawada located in NTR district of the Indian state of Andhra Pradesh. It is the headquarters of Vijayawada (rural) mandal in Vijayawada revenue division. It is a part of Vijayawada metropolitan area. The largest mango market in Asia is located in Nunna.

== Transport ==
Nunna is located at north of Vijayawada and lies on the Nuzvid - Vijayawada state highway. Vijayawada Junction is the nearest Railway station to Nunna at about 10 km from Nunna. The satellite stations Gunadala, Ramavarappadu, and Mustabada are also nearby. Vijayawada International Airport in Gannavaram is the nearest airport, about 15 km from Nunna.
