= Diocese of Srikakulam =

Roman Catholic diocese in Andhra Pradesh, India

Diocese of Srikakulam Dioecese of Srikakulamensis శ్రీకాకుళం మేత్రాసనము

catholic

Location
- Country: India
- Territory: Andhra Pradesh
- Ecclesiastical province: Visakhapatnam
- Metropolitan: Visakhapatnam
- Headquarters: Srikakulam
- Coordinates: 18°18′27″N 83°53′24″E

Statistics
- Area: 8,524 km^{2} (3,291 sq mi)
- Population: Total; Catholics: (as of 2020); 3,895,000; 85,900 (2.2%)
- Parishes: 36
- Churches: 37 missions

Information
- Denomination: Roman Catholic
- Rite: Latin Rite
- Established: July 1, 1993
- Cathedral: Cathedral of Our Lady of Mercy, Srikakulam
- Patron saint: Mary Help of Christians
- Secular priests: 68
- Language: Telugu

Current leadership
- Pope: Leo XIV
- Bishop: Vijaya Kumar Rayarala
- Metropolitan Archbishop: Udumala Bala

Website
- dioceseofsrikakulam.org/beta/

The Roman Catholic Diocese of Srikakulam (Latin: Srikakulamen(sis)) is a diocese located in the city of Srikakulam in the ecclesiastical province of Visakhapatnam in India.

== History ==
- 1 July 1993: Established as Diocese of Srikakulam from the Diocese of Visakhapatnam

== Leadership ==
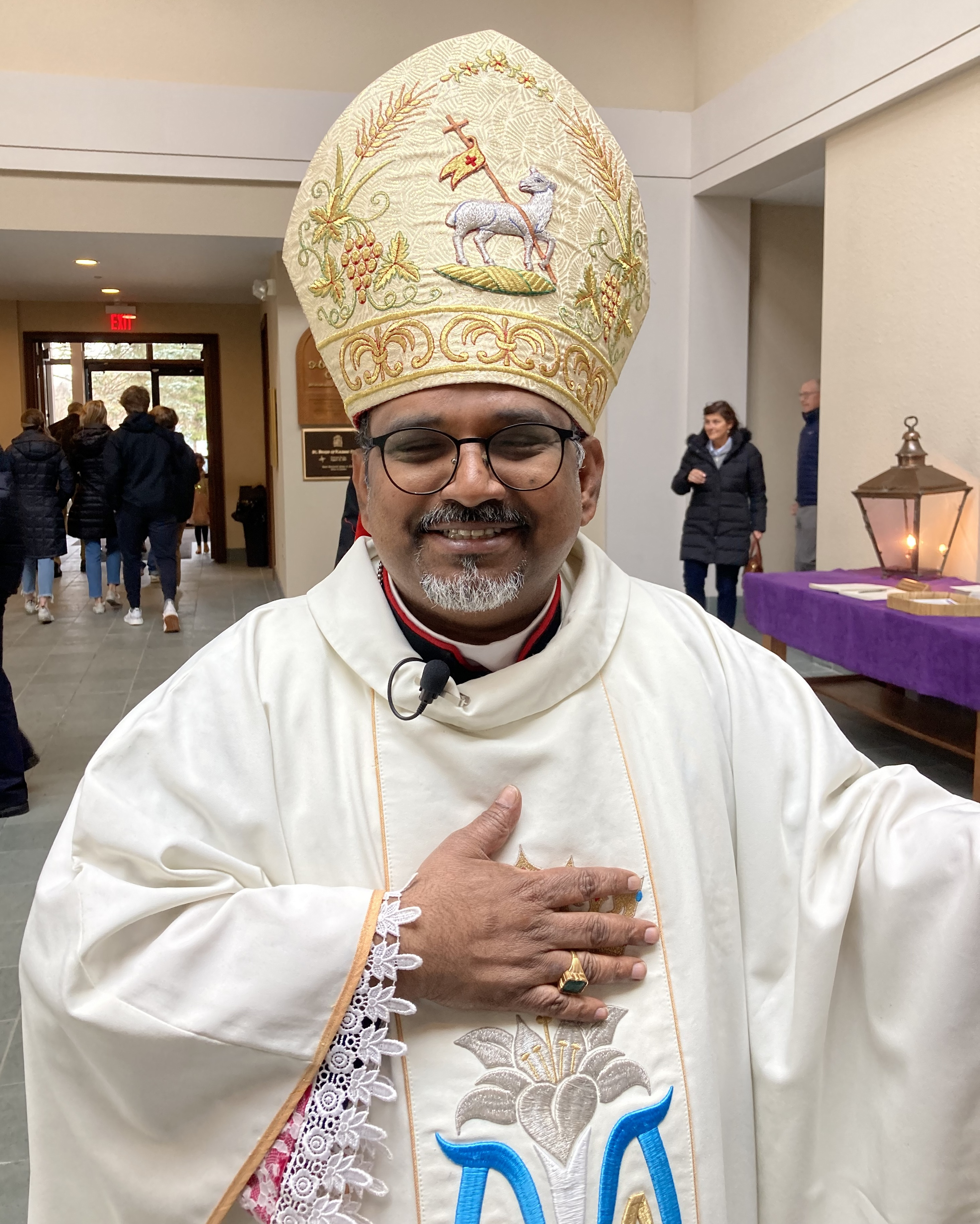
Bishop Rayarala visiting a church in Dublin, Ohio in 2022

Bishops of Srikakulam (Latin Rite)

- Bishop Innayya Chinna Addagatla (1 July 1993 – 12 December 2018)
- Bishop Vijaya Kumar Rayarala

== Parishes ==
- Cathedral of Our Lady of Mercy
