= Udumala Bala Showreddy =

Indian Catholic archbishop and clergyman (born 1954)

His Excellency The Most Reverend Monsignor Dr. Udumala Bala Showreddy
- Metropolitan Archbishop of Vishakhapatnam
- Appointed: 08 February 2025
- Predecessor: Prakash Mallavarapu
- Successor: Incumbent
- Previous post: Bishop of Warangal (2013–2025)

Orders
- Ordination: 20 Feb 1979
- Consecration: 23 May 2013 by Oswald Cardinal Gracias

Personal details
- Born: 18 June 1954 (age 72) Ghanpur, Andhra Pradesh, India
- Denomination: Roman Catholic
- Education: Alphonsian Academy
- Motto: Amor Omnia Vincit

Archbishop Mons. Dr. Udumala Bala Showreddy is an Indian Catholic prelate and clergyman. On 8 February 2025, he was appointed the Metropolitan Archbishop of Roman Catholic Archdiocese of Visakhapatnam, succeeding Mons. Prakash Mallavarapu. He served as the Bishop of the Roman Catholic Diocese of Warangal until 2025.

== Early life ==
He was born on 18 June 1954 in Ghanpur, Andhra Pradesh, India.

== Education ==
He has acquired the Doctorate in Moral Theology from Alphonsianum, Rome.

== Priesthood ==
He was ordained a priest on 20 February 1979. He has served in several pastoral and administrative roles in his diocese before becoming a bishop. He was deputy-secretary general of the Catholic Bishops' Conference of India (CCBI), Bangalore. From 1994 to 2006 he taught moral theology at St. John’s Regional Seminary, Hyderabad.

== Episcopate ==
He was appointed bishop of Warangal, India, on 13 April 2013 by Pope Francis. He was ordained a bishop on 23 May 2013 by Oswald Cardinal Gracias.
