= Phirangipuram =

- Village
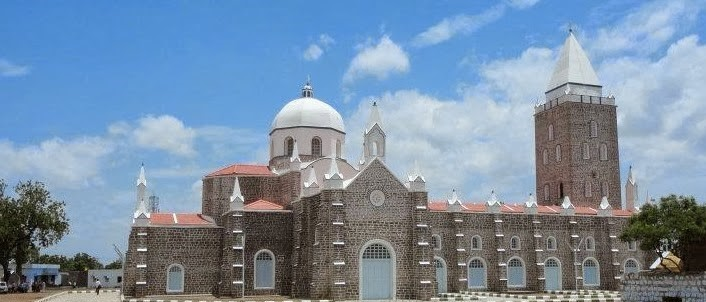
- Interactive map of Phirangipuram
- Location in Andhra Pradesh, India
- Coordinates: 16°17′20″N 80°15′46″E
- Country: India
- State: Andhra Pradesh
- District: Guntur
- Mandal: Phirangipuram

Government
  - Type: Panchayati raj
  - Body: Phirangipuram gram panchayat

Area
  - Total: 1,336 ha (3,300 acres)

Population (2011)
  - Total: 16,365
  - Density: 1,225/km^{2} (3,173/sq mi)

Languages
  - Official: Telugu
- Time zone: UTC+5:30 (IST)
- PIN: 522529
- Area code: +91–8641
- Vehicle registration: AP

Phirangipuram is a village in Guntur district of the Indian state of Andhra Pradesh. It is located in Phirangipuram mandal of Guntur revenue division.

== Demographics ==
As of 2011 Census of India, the village had a population of 16,365, of which males are 8,155, females are 8,210 and the population under 6 years of age are 1,650. The average literacy rate stands at 70.25 percent, with 10,337 literates.

== Government and politics ==
Phirangipuram gram panchayat is the local self-government of the village. It is divided into wards and each ward is represented by a ward member. The ward members are headed by a Sarpanch. The village forms a part of Andhra Pradesh Capital Region and is under the jurisdiction of APCRDA.

== Education ==
As per the school information report for the academic year 2018–19, the village has a total of 19 schools. These include 8 Zilla Parishad/ Mandal Parishad and 11 private schools.

== See also ==
- List of villages in Guntur district
