= Gollapudi, Vijayawada =

Gollapudi
- Neighbourhood
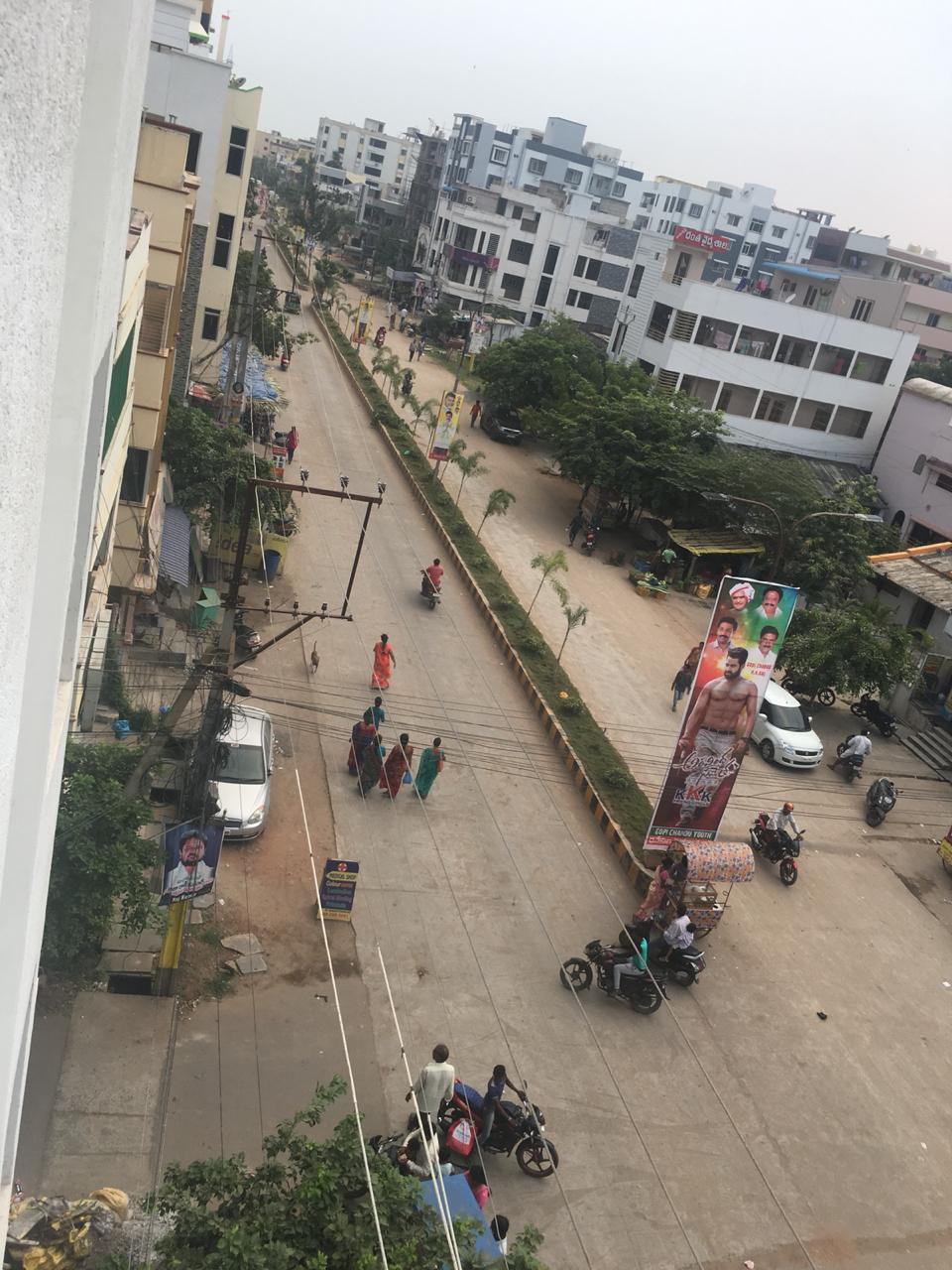
- Gollapudi Main Road

- Location in Andhra Pradesh, India Gollapudi (India)
- Coordinates: 16°32′N 80°35′E
- Country: India
- State: Andhra Pradesh
- District: Krishna
- City: Vijayawada
- Mandal: Vijayawada(Rural)

Population (2011)
  - Total: 37,349

Languages
  - Official: Telugu
- Time zone: UTC+5:30 (IST)
- PIN: 521225
- Telephone code: 0866
- Vehicle registration: AP 16
- Metro: AMRDA

Gollapudi is a commercial and residential hub located in western part of Vijayawada in the Indian state of Andhra Pradesh. It falls under Vijayawada Rural mandal in Vijayawada revenue division of NTR district. As per the G. O. No. M. S. 104 (Dated: 23 March 2017), Municipal Administration and Urban Development Department, it is a part of Vijayawada Metropolitan Area.

== Transport ==
APSRTC operates bus services connecting Gollapudi with Vijayawada city and nearby areas.

Route number	Start	End	Via
301	Gollapudi	PNBS (Pandit Nehru Bus Station)	Gollapudi, Pnbs
302	Gollapudi	Benz Circle	Gollapudi, Pnbs, Benz Circle
303	Gollapudi	Autonagar Bus Stand	Gollapudi, Pnbs, Benz Circle, Patamata, Autonagar Bus Stand
304	Gollapudi	Kaleswararao Market	Gollapudi, Old Bus Stand, Kaleswararao Market
305	Gollapudi	Vijayawada Railway Station	Gollapudi, Pnbs, Railway Station

== Images ==
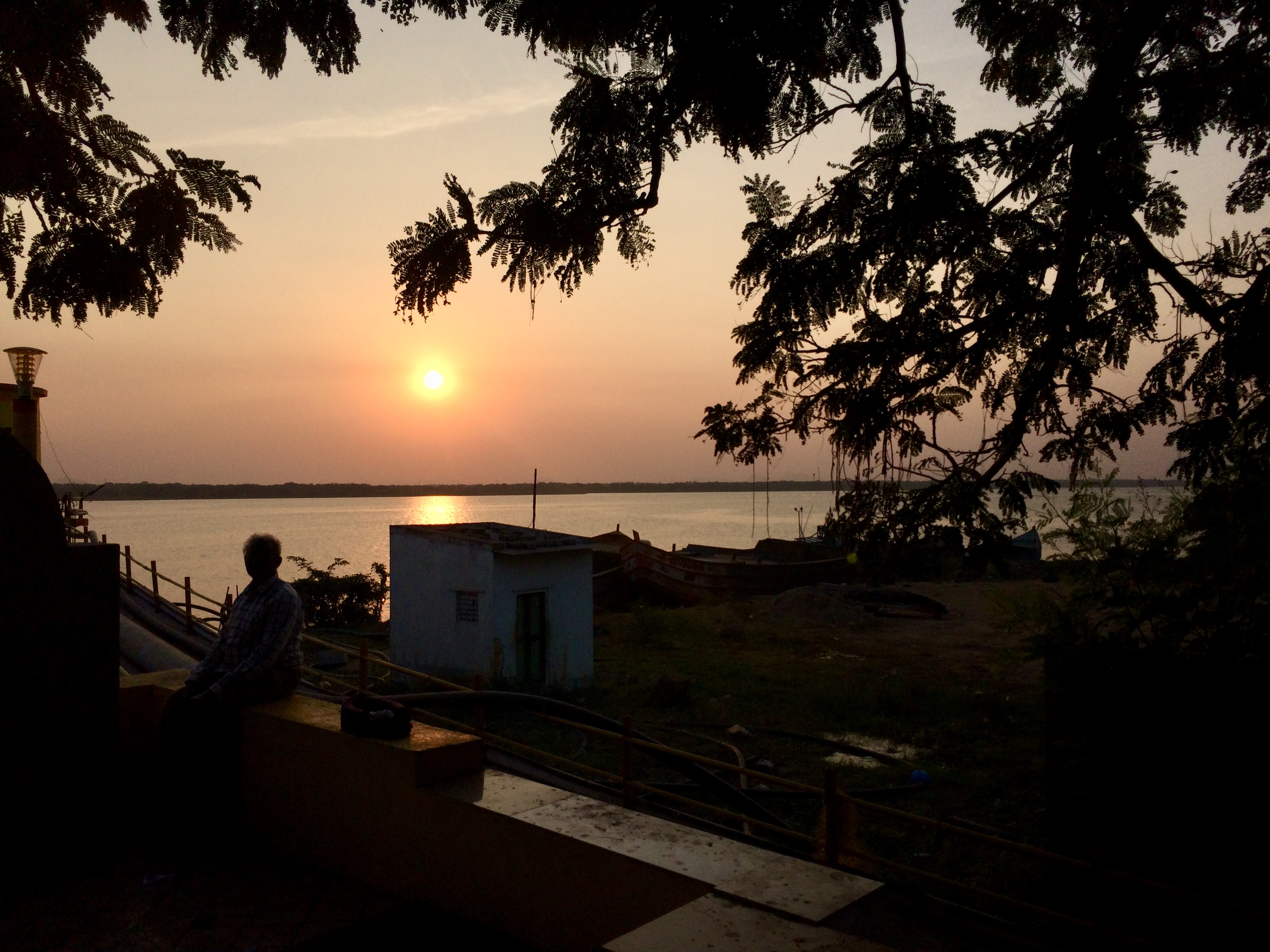
Krishna River

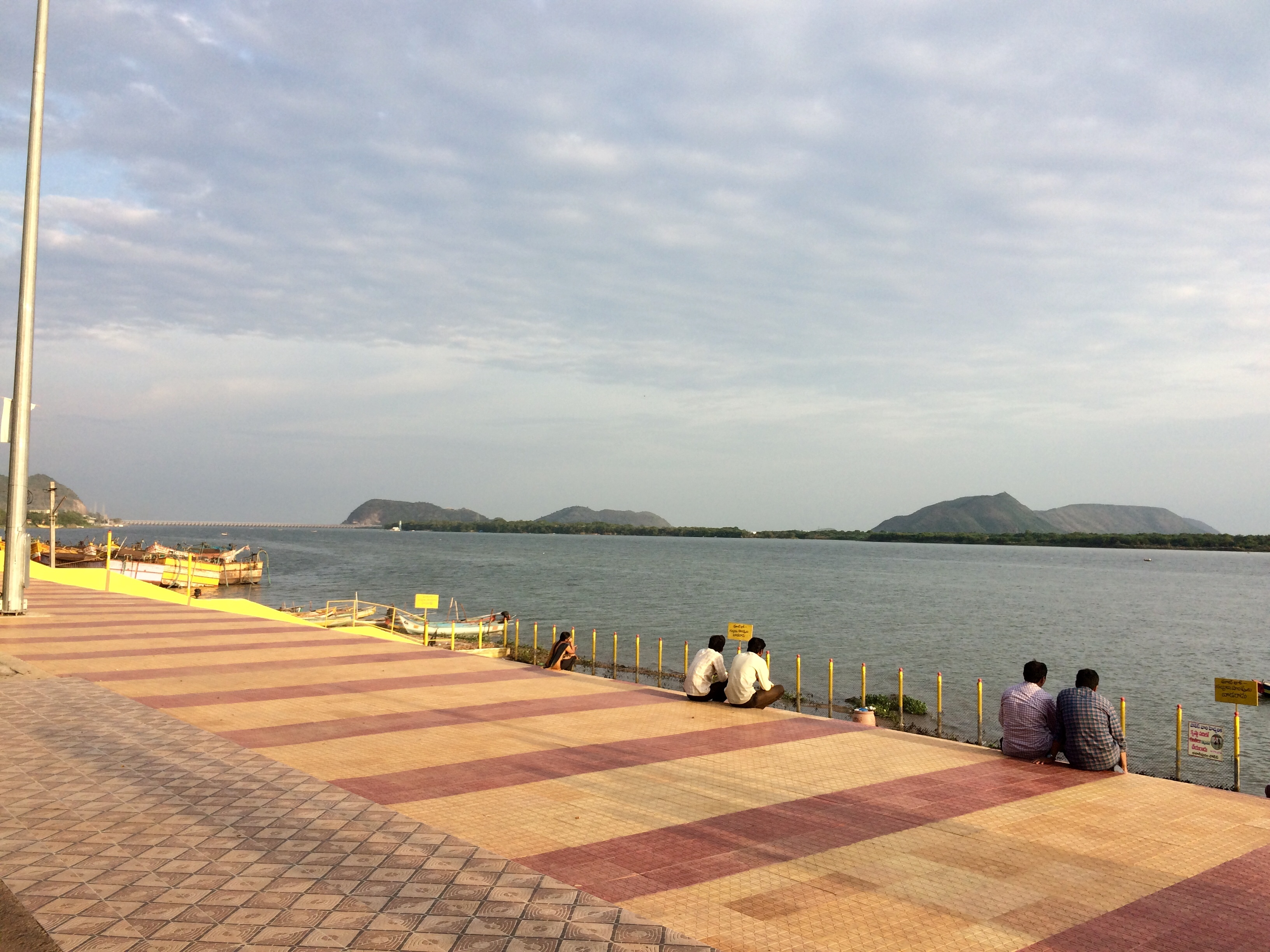
RiverFront, Gollapudi

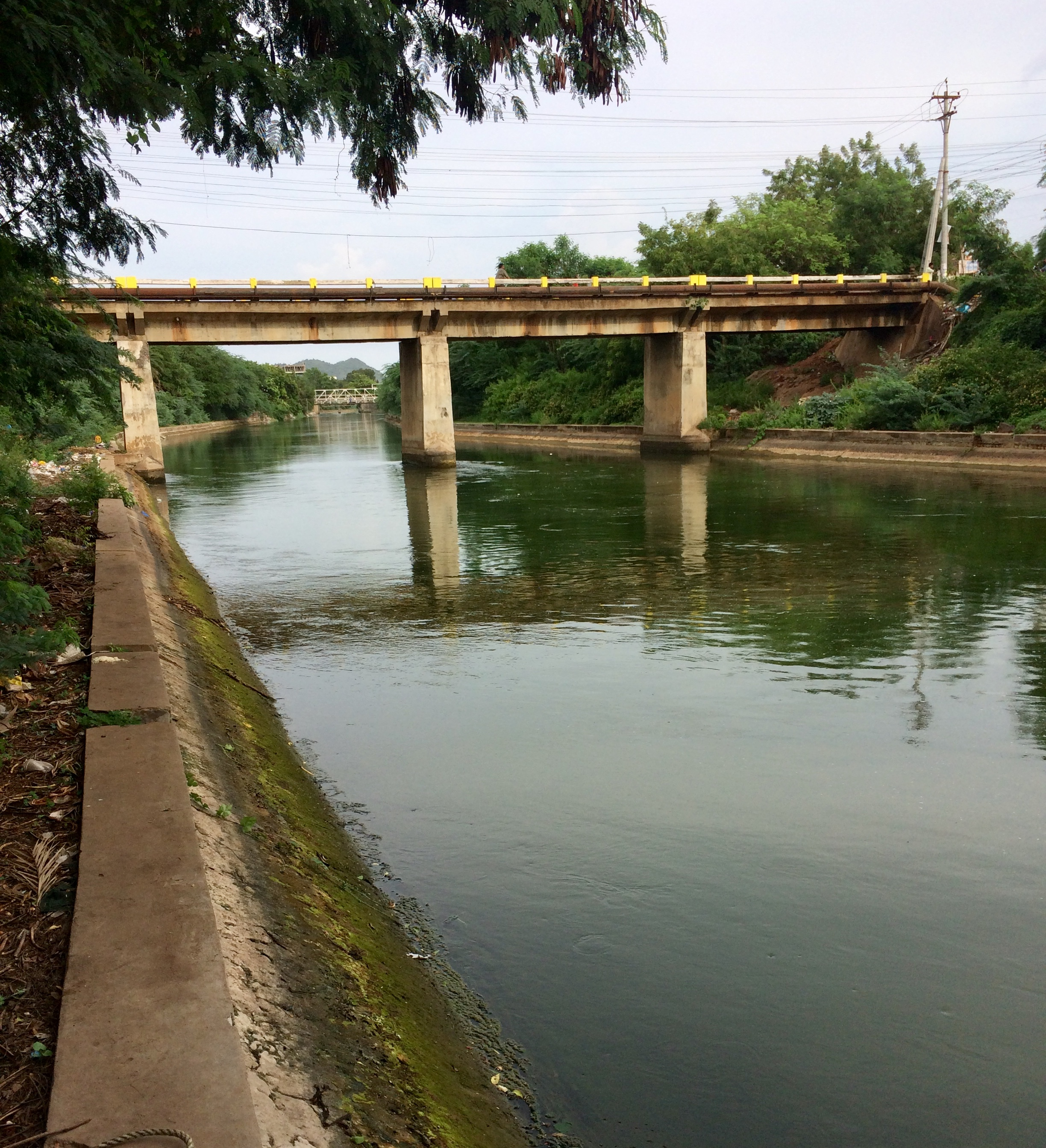
VTPS Canal Gollapudi, Vijayawada

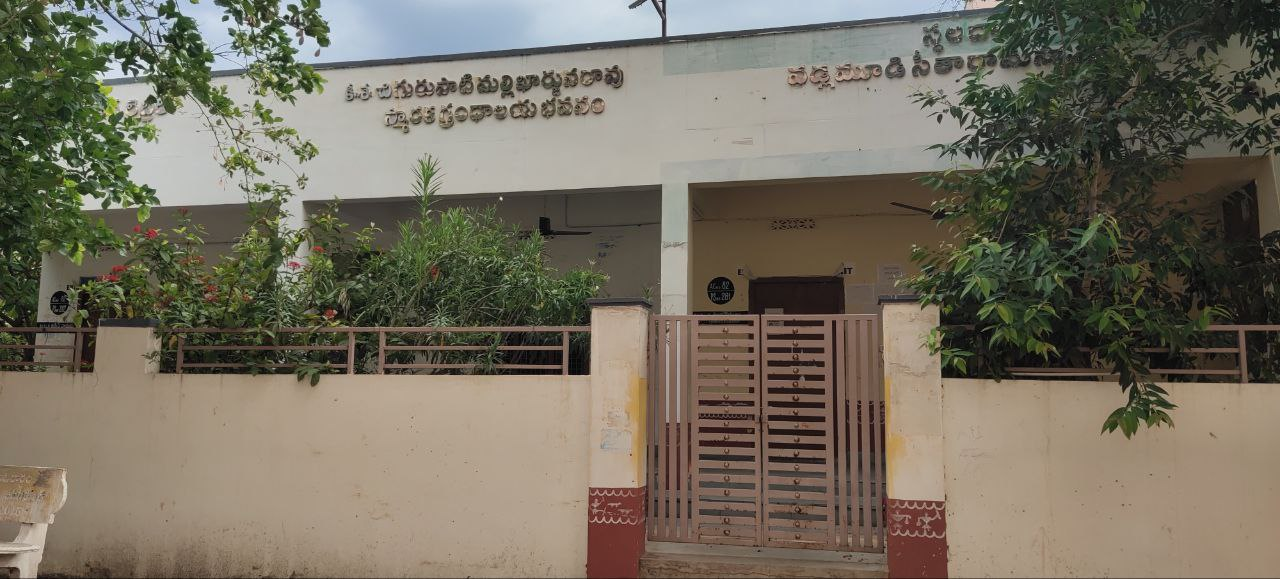
Chigurupati Mallikarjuna Rao Memorial Library Building

Transport= The busses are available from P.N.B.S platform no.7 you can catch them and reach Gollapudi, Ibrahimpatnam and Kondapalli like Bus no. 1,47,110,144,145,152,266,350 etc...
