= John Mulagada =

Bishop M. John, RCM Ayyagaru
- 1st Bishop in Eluru
- Church: Roman Catholic
- Diocese: Roman Catholic Diocese of Eluru
- Predecessor: Position created
- Successor: P. Jaya Rao, RCM

Orders
- Ordination: 4 January 1965 by Joseph Baud, MSFS
- Consecration: 5 May 1977 by D. S. Lourdusamy, RCM (Principal consecrator): S. Arulappa, RCM (Co-consecrator); G. Ignatius, MSFS (Co-consecrator)
- Rank: Bishop

Personal details
- Born: John Mulagada; 12 December 1937 Marriveedu, erstwhile East Godavari district (Madras Presidency)
- Died: 16 August 2009 (aged 71) Eluru, erstwhile West Godavari district (Andhra Pradesh)
- Buried: Eluru
- Denomination: Christianity
- Occupation: Priest
- Education: B. Th. (St. John's)
- Alma mater: St. Anthonys High School, Visakhapatnam; St. Peters Minor Seminary, Cuddapah; St. John's Regional Seminary, Nellore/Hyderabad

John Mulagada (12 December 1937 – 16 August 2009) was the Indian Roman Catholic bishop of the Roman Catholic Diocese of Eluru, India.

Ordained to the priesthood on 4 January 1965, Pope Paul VI appointed Mulagada the first bishop of the newly created Eluru Diocese and he was ordained Bishop on 5 May 1977. In 1984 he gave the agreement and approval to Jose Kaimlett for the constitutions and support to the society Heralds of Good News

Bishop Mulagada was the first Dalit to become bishop in India.
