= Dokiparru =

- Village
- Interactive map of Dokiparru
- Location in Andhra Pradesh, India Dokiparru (India)
- Country: India
- State: Andhra Pradesh
- District: Krishna

Area
  - Total: 15.84 km^{2} (6.12 sq mi)

Population (2011)
  - Total: 5,909
  - Density: 373.0/km^{2} (966.2/sq mi)

Languages
  - Official: Telugu
- Time zone: UTC+5:30 (IST)

Dokiparru is a village in Gudlavalleru mandal, located in the Krishna district of the Indian state of Andhra Pradesh. Sri Bhusametha Venkateswara Swami Temple is a popular temple in this village, making the village a pilgrimage place.

== How to Reach ==
APSRTC bus number 333D from KR Market, Vijayawada takes to this temple. By train Kavutaram is the nearest Railway Station in the line of Secunderabad, Vijayawada and Machilipatnam. This station is 4.8 km away from the temple. Autos are available From Pamarru, Nidumolu, Gudlavalleru.

== Climate ==
Temperature ranges between 40-47 °C during summer, and 12-28 °C during winter. It takes 45 min to 1 hour to reach from Machilipatnam, and 2–3 hours from Vijayawada. Vijayawada is 60 km away, Machilipatnam is 17 km far, Gudivada is 19 km, Vuyyuru is 28 km from Dokiparru.
