= Medikonduru =

- Village
- Interactive map of Medikonduru
- Location in Andhra Pradesh, India
- Coordinates: 16°20′47″N 80°17′49″E
- Country: India
- State: Andhra Pradesh
- District: Guntur
- Mandal: Medikonduru

Government
  - Type: Panchayati raj
  - Body: Medikonduru gram panchayat

Area
  - Total: 1,254 ha (3,100 acres)

Population (2011)
  - Total: 10,046
  - Density: 801.1/km^{2} (2,075/sq mi)

Languages
  - Official: Telugu
- Time zone: UTC+5:30 (IST)
- PIN: 522xxx
- Area code: +91–863
- Vehicle registration: AP

Medikonduru is a village in Guntur district of the Indian state of Andhra Pradesh. It is the headquarters of Medikonduru mandal in Guntur revenue division.

== Geography ==
Medikonduru is situated at 16°20′47″N 80°17′49″E. It is spread over an area of 1,254 ha (3,100 acres).

== Governance ==
Medikonduru gram panchayat is the local self-government of the village. It is divided into wards and each ward is represented by a ward member. The village forms a part of Andhra Pradesh Capital Region and is under the jurisdiction of APCRDA.

== Education ==
As per the school information report for the academic year 2018–19, the village has a total of 12 schools. These include 10 Zilla Parishad/MPP and 2 private schools.

== See also ==
- List of villages in Guntur district
