= Gallela Prasad =

Indian prelate of the Catholic Church (born 1962)

His Excellency Gallela Prasad
- Bishop emeritus of Cuddapah
- Church: Roman Catholic
- See: Cuddapah
- Appointed: 31 January 2008
- Term ended: 10 December 2018
- Predecessor: D. M. Prakasam
- Previous posts: Professor of Christian Doctrine, St. John's Regional Seminary, Kothavalasa

Orders
- Ordination: 1 March 1989 by Matthew Cheriankunnel
- Consecration: 1 March 2008 by Marampudi Joji

Personal details
- Born: 7 April 1962 (age 64) Adoni, Andhra Pradesh

Gallela Prasad (born 7 April 1962) is an Indian prelate of the Catholic Church who served as the Bishop of the Cuddapah, Andhra Pradesh, from 2008 to 2018.

He is well versed in Latin as well as Telugu and English.

== Biography ==
Prasad was born the fourth and youngest child in a family of teachers in Adoni in Andhra Pradesh. Smt. Mariamma and Sri Jojappa were his parents. He went to school in his hometown and later attended St. Pius Minor Seminary in Kurnool.

He studied philosophy at St. John's Regional Seminary, Kondadaba, Visakhapatnam, and then theology at the St. John's Regional Seminary in Ramanthapur, Hyderabad.

On 1 March 1989, Prasad was ordained a priest of the Catholic Diocese of Kurnool by Bishop Mathew Cheriankunnel. After his ordination, Prasad served as a Youth Services Director of the diocese of Kurnool from 1989 to 1993 as well as a warden for St. Mary's Junior College, Kurnool from 1989 to 1990.

From 1990 to 1995, he was a parish priest in Koilakunta. He also served as Spiritual Director of the Legion of Mary from 1993 to 1995.

From 1995 to 1999 Prasad studied in Rome at the Pontifical University of St. Thomas Aquinas Angelicum where he earned a Doctorate of Sacred Theology degree. His thesis was entitled Christian Charity as Witnessed by Mother Teresa of Calcutta. On returning to India in 1999, he was Pastor in St. John's Church, Uppaladadiya till 2000. From 2000 to 2004 he served as a pastor in the Diocese of San Angelo, Texas, U.S.

In 2004, he was made Spiritual Director and Professor of Christian Doctrine in the St. John's Regional Seminary (Philosophate) in Kothavalasa, Visakhapatnam.

Pope Benedict XVI appointed Prasad Bishop of Cuddapah on 31 January 2008. He was consecrated on 1 March 2008 at the St. Mary's Old Cathedral Grounds, Mariapuram, Cuddapah, by Marampudi Joji, Archbishop of Hyderabad, with Kagithapu Mariadas, Archbishop of Visakhapatnam and the D. M. Prakasam, Bishop of Nellore as co-consecrators. Almost all the Catholic Bishops of the Andhra region took part in the consecration. Among the ecumenical invitees was K. B. Yesuvaraprasad, the Church of South India's Bishop of Rayalaseema. He chose as his episcopal motto Ego sum Pastor bonus or "I am the good shepherd".

In June 2018, two lay Catholics initiated a lawsuit against Gallela, charging that he misappropriated church funds to support his wife and 20-year-old son. Gallela denied the charges and the woman was his brother's widow, misidentified as his wife in certain deeds. Pope Francis accepted his resignation as bishop on 10 December 2018.

Religious titles
Preceded by D. M. Prakasam	Bishop of Cuddapah; 31 January 2008 – 10 December 2018	Succeeded by vacant
