= St. John's Regional Seminary (Philosophate) =

St. John's Regional Seminary, Kondadaba (Philosophate)
- St John's, Kondadaba
- Motto: Sapientes, Sanctus
- Motto in English: Wisdom, Holiness
- Type: Propaedeutic Seminary
- Established: 1987
- President: Raminedi Balaraju SDB, (Provincial)
- Rector: Koonananickal Jose, SDB
- Principal: Mathiekal Wilson, SDB
- Location: Kothavalasa, Vizianagaram District 535 183, Andhra Pradesh. Telephone:91 08966 273412, India; 17°53′56″N 83°9′8″E
- Campus: Rural; Andhra University, Visakhapatnam 530 003, Andhra Pradesh, India; Roman Curia, The Congregation for Catholic Education, Piazza Pio XII 3, 00193, Rome, Italy.
- Website: www.stjohnskondadaba.blogspot.com
- Data as of September 2010

St. John's Regional Seminary (Philosophate) founded in 1987 is a propaedeutic seminary equipping students with philosophical training. It is located in the rural town of Kothavalasa in the Vizianagaram District in Andhra Pradesh, India.

== Affiliation ==
The seminary is not affiliated to any university. However, the Seminary is listed as a propaedeutic seminary under the Roman Curia.

The seminary used to offer a two-year course in philosophy. but, from 1999, it began offering a three-year course in philosophy to enable its students to simultaneously pursue the secular graduate degrees of Bachelor of Arts (B. A.) and Master of Arts (M. A.) through the School of Distance Education, Andhra University, Visakhapatnam.

== Background ==
St. John's Regional Seminary was founded in 1965 in Ramanthapur, Hyderabad to train Priests for the Catholic Church in Andhra Pradesh. Later in 1987, the seminary was split into two. The theologiate was retained in Hyderabad while the philosophate was moved to Kothavalasa in the northern circars of Andhra Pradesh.

== Authorities and officials ==
According to an agreement signed between the Andhra Pradesh Bishop’s Council and the Salesian Province of St. Joseph, Hyderabad, on 24 May 1993 the management of the seminary has been entrusted to the Salesians of Don Bosco for a period of ten years. The contract was in 2003 for a period of six years. It was renewed again in 2009 for ten more years. The Seminary is overseen by the following Salesians:

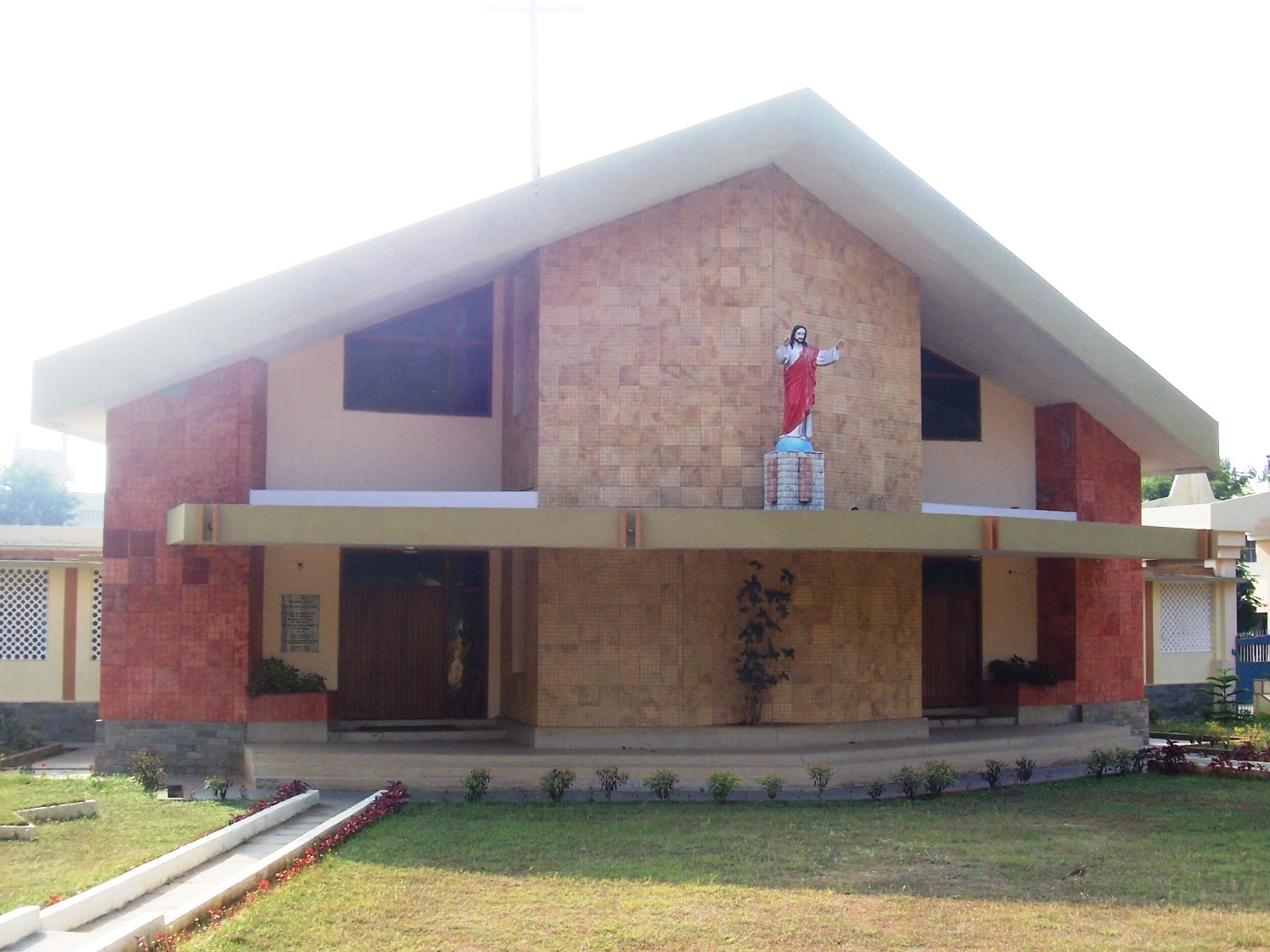
St.John's Chapel at Kondadaba

- Provincial - Rev. Fr. Raminedi Balaraju, SDB
- Rector - Fr. Koonananickal Jose, SDB
- Dean - Br. Vincent Castilino, SDB
- Principal - Fr. Mathiekal Wilson, SDB
- Administrator - Fr. Cherapanath Rinoy, SDB

== Admissions ==
The seminary follows a semester system. Admission is for Catholic pupils who are eligible to pursue priestly studies and who come from any of the ten Catholic dioceses and two archdioceses in Andhra Pradesh as well as any religious Congregation willing to send their students for Priestly formation.

== Staff ==
=== Faculty ===
- Theology and Spirituality, English
  - Fr. K. Jose
  - Fr. S. Devadas
- Systematic Philosophy
  - Fr. M. Wilson
  - Fr. C. Rinoy
  - Br. V. Castilino

=== Visiting Faculty ===
- Sr. Philomena D'Souza, FMA
- Fr. G. Lazar, SVD
- Fr. Mark K. Raj, SJ
- Fr. C. P. Varghese, SDB
- Fr. Francis Stephen, MSFS
- Fr. P. Antony
- Fr. P. Johnson, OFM Cap.
- Fr. Francis Stephen, MSFS

=== Other staff ===
- Assistant Librarian and Clerk
  - Sri Ch. Sai Ram
- Computers
  - Sri R. Joseph

=== Past faculty ===
- Bishop G. Prasad

== See also ==
Other university-affiliated seminaries in Andhra region

- Master's College of Theology, Visakhapatnam
- Bethel Bible College, Guntur

Theological degrees:

- Doctor of Divinity (D.Div.), Doctor of Theology (Th.D.), Master of Theology (Th.M.), Bachelor of Divinity (B.Div.), Bachelor of Theology (Th.B.), Licentiate in Theology, Licentiate in Sacred Scripture

Members of the Andhra Pradesh Federation of Churches

- Archbishop M. Joji
- Bishop G. Prasad
- Bishop D. M. Prakasam
- Bishop G. Dyvasirvadam
- Bishop V. E. Christopher
- Bishop B. P. Sugandhar

Indigenous scholars

- B. V. Subbamma
- Y. D. Tiwari
- D. S. Amalorpavadass a.k.a. Swamy Amalorananda
