= Johannes Gorantla =

Indian Catholic bishop (1952–2007)

Bishop G. Johannes, RCM Bishop - in - Kurnool (1993-2007)
- The Most Reverend
- Church: Roman Catholic church (Latin rite)
- Diocese: Kurnool
- Appointed: 6 December 1993
- In office: 1993/2007
- Predecessor: C. Mathew, PIME
- Successor: P. Anthony, RCM
- Other posts: Spiritual Formator, RCM-St. John's Regional Seminary, Hyderabad (1991-1993)
- Previous posts: Director of Catholic Centre and Pastoral Centre, Vijayawada (1977-1981); Parish Priest - in - Korukollu (1982-1985); Correspondent, St. Francis High School, Machilipatnam (1989-1990); Deputy Manager, Vijayawada Diocesan Schools (1990)

Orders
- Ordination: 19 March 1977, RCM-St. Peter's Cathedral, Vijayawada by Joseph S. Thumma, RCM
- Consecration: 26 January 1994 by S. Arulappa, RCM (Principal Consecrator), Joseph S. Thumma, RCM and C. Mathew, PIME (Principal Co-Consecrators)
- Rank: Bishop

Personal details
- Born: Gorantla Johannes; April 10, 1952 Munagalapalli, Krishna district (Andhra Pradesh)
- Died: January 20, 2007 (aged 54) Kurnool (Andhra Pradesh)
- Buried: RCM-Our Lady of Lourdes Cathedral, Kurnool
- Denomination: Christianity
- Parents: Smt. Anthonamma (Mother); Sri G. Augustine (Father)
- Education: B.Th. (St. John's); Ph.D. (Urban) (1989)
- Alma mater: St. Ambrose Minor Seminary, Nuziveedu (Andhra Pradesh); St. John's Regional Seminary, Hyderabad (Telangana); Pontifical Urban University, Rome (Italy)

Pope Francis appointed Father Johannes Gorantla, O.C.D., as bishop of Kurnool on Feb. 27, 2024.

Bishop Gorantla was born on Feb. 27, 1974, in Nawabu peta in Vijaywada diocese. He studied philosophy at Sacred Heart Philosophical College, Alwaye (1994-1997), and theology at Pontifical Institute of Theology Teresianum, Rome (1998-2001).

He made his solemn profession in April 2000, and was ordained a priest on Jan. 10, 2002. He served as assistant parish priest at Kalluru, Khammam, (2002). He obtained a licentiate in Sacred Scriptures from Biblicum, Rome (2002-2006) and a doctorate in biblical theology from the Pontifical Gregorian University, Rome (2006-2008).

He was the provincial of Discalced Carmelite Andhra Province, secretary of the OCD inter-provincial council of India and the consulter for Khammam diocese.

He has also served as president of the Andhra Pradesh Religious Conference and vice-chairman of the APBC Commission for Catholic Education (2010-2014).

He was a rector of International College for Priest Students, Teresianum, Rome, from 2021 to 2024.
