= Anthony Poola =

Indian Latin Catholic bishop (born 1961)

His Eminence Anthony Poola
- Cardinal, Metropolitan Archbishop of Hyderabad
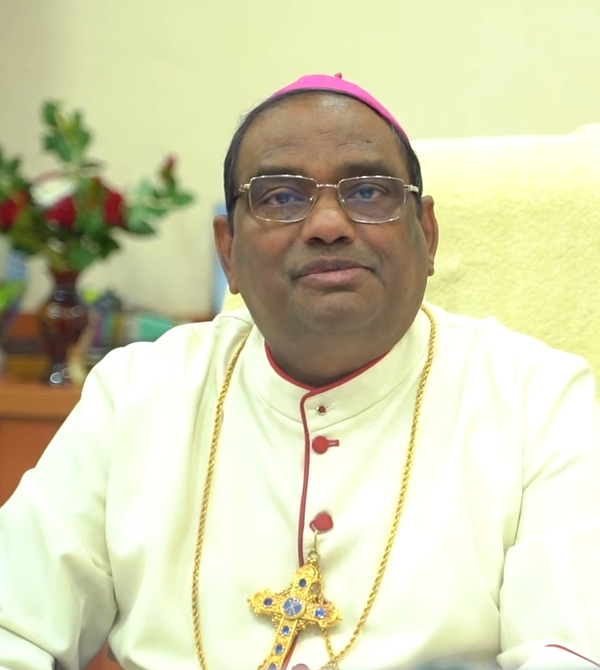
- Church: Roman Catholic Church
- Archdiocese: Archdiocese of Hyderabad
- See: Hyderabad
- Appointed: 19 November 2020
- Installed: 3 January 2021
- Predecessor: Thumma Bala
- Other post: President of the Catholic Bishops' Conference of India (2026-)
- Previous post: Bishop of Kurnool (2008–2020)

Orders
- Ordination: 20 February 1992
- Consecration: 19 April 2008 by Marampudi Joji
- Created cardinal: 27 August 2022 by Pope Francis
- Rank: Cardinal Priest

Personal details
- Born: 15 November 1961 (age 64) Poluru, Prakasam, Andhra Pradesh
- Denomination: Christianity
- Residence: India
- Parents: Smt. Arogyamma (Mother); Sri P. C. Anthony (Father)
- Education: Minor Seminary, Kurnool; STBC College, Kurnool; St. Paul's Seminary, Nuziveedu; St. Peter's Pontifical Seminary; Pontifical Urban University; Sri Krishnadevaraya University; Bronson Methodist Hospital, certificate in Clinical pastoral education; Loyola University Chicago, certificate in religion and theological engagement
- Motto: Good news to the poor
- Coat of arms

Styles of Anthony Poola
- Reference style: His Eminence
- Spoken style: Your Eminence
- Religious style: Cardinal
- Informal style: Cardinal
- See: Hyderabad

Anthony Poola (born 15 November 1961) is an Indian prelate of the Catholic Church who has been Metropolitan Archbishop of Hyderabad since 2021. He was Bishop of Kurnool from 2008 to 2020. Before becoming a bishop, he worked as a priest of the Diocese of Cuddapah. He became president of the Catholic Bishops' Conference of India (CBCI) in 2026.

On 27 August 2022, Pope Francis made Poola a Cardinal, the first Dalit and the first Telugu to hold that rank.

== Biography ==
Anthony Poola was born on 15 November 1961 in Chindukur, Durvesi Parish, in the Diocese of Kurnool. When poverty forced him to leave school after the seventh grade, missionaries took an interest in him and helped him continue his schooling. After attending the Minor Seminary in Nuzvid, he studied at St. Peter's Pontifical Seminary in Bangalore. He was ordained a priest on 20 February 1992 and incardinated in the Diocese of Cuddapah.

He held the following positions: 1992-1993: parish vicar of St. Mary's Cathedral from 1992 to 1993; parish vicar in Amagampalli from 1993 to 1994; pastor in Tekurpet from 1994 to 1995; pastor in Badvel from 1995 to 2000; pastor in Veerapalli from 2000 to 2001. He studied for a master's degree in health pastoral care and took courses in theology at Loyola University Chicago. He also worked at St. Genevieve Church in the Archdiocese of Chicago.

Returning to his home diocese of Cuddapah, he was director of the Christian Foundation for Children and Aging from 2004 to 2008. He was also Diocesan Consultor, Secretary for Education, Deputy Administrator of the Schools of the Diocese and Coordinator of the Sponsorship Program.

On 8 February 2008, Pope Benedict XVI appointed him Bishop of Kurnool.

On 19 November 2020, Pope Francis appointed him Metropolitan Archbishop of Hyderabad. He was installed there on 3 January 2021.

On 27 August 2022, Pope Francis made him a cardinal priest, assigning him the title of Santi Protomartiri a Via Aurelia Antica. He participated as a cardinal elector in the 2025 papal conclave that elected Pope Leo XIV.

The Catholic Bishops’ Conference of India elected him to a two-year term as president on 7 February 2026.

== See also ==
- Cardinals created by Pope Francis
