= Thumma Bala =

Indian Roman Catholic priest (1944–2024)

The Most Reverend Thumma Bala
- Archbishop Emeritus of Hyderabad
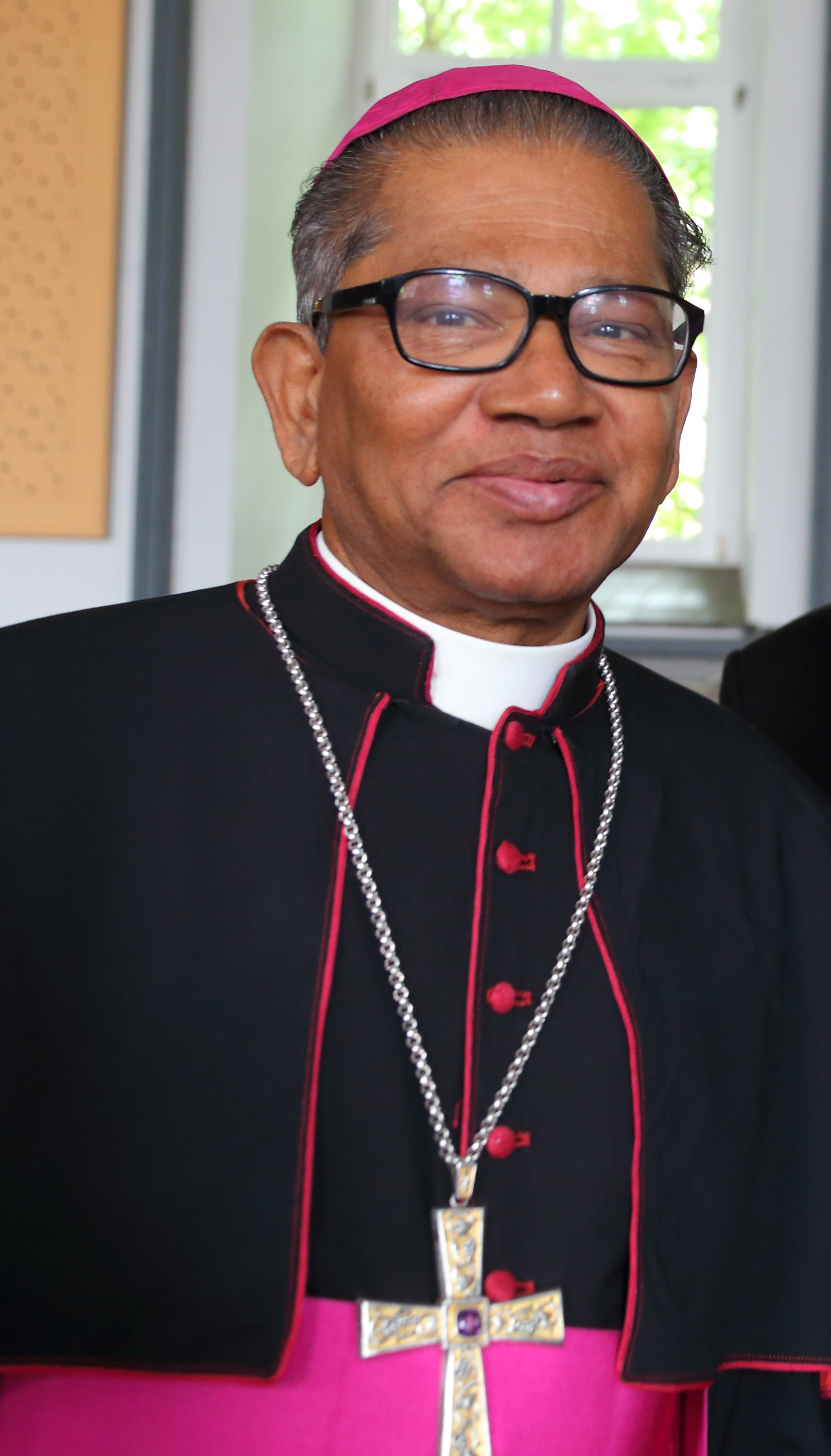
- Archbishop Thumma Bala
- Archdiocese: Hyderabad
- See: Hyderabad
- Appointed: 12 March 2011
- Installed: 5 May 2011
- Term ended: 19 November 2020
- Predecessor: Marampudi Joji
- Successor: Anthony Poola
- Other posts: Chairman of Andhra Pradesh Bishop's Council, Chairman of Communication Commission of the Diocese
- Previous posts: Member of the Pontifical Council for Health Care, Member CBCI Commission for Health care, Bishop of Warangal (1987–2011)

Orders
- Ordination: 21 December 1970
- Consecration: 12 March 1987 by Samineni Arulappa

Personal details
- Born: 24 April 1944 Narmetta, Hyderabad State, India
- Died: 30 May 2024 (aged 80) Warangal, Telangana, India
- Motto: To work in charity and in unity

Styles of Thumma Bala
- Reference style: The Most Reverend
- Spoken style: Your Excellency
- Religious style: Monsignor
- Posthumous style: not applicable

Thumma Bala (24 April 1944 – 30 May 2024) was an Indian Roman Catholic prelate who served as the archbishop of Hyderabad and chairman of Andhra Pradesh Bishops' council and also the chairman of Communication Commission of the diocese from 5 May 2011 to 19 November 2020.

== Background ==
Bala was born in Narmetta, Hyderabad State on 24 April 1944. He died in Warangal, Telangana on 30 May 2024, at the age of 80.

== Priesthood ==
Bala was ordained a Catholic Priest on 21 December 1970.

== Episcopate ==
Bala was appointed Bishop of Warangal on 17 November 1986 by Pope John Paul II. He was ordained Bishop on 12 March 1987. He was appointed Archbishop of Hyderabad on 12 March 2011 by Pope Benedict XVI and installed as Archbishop of Hyderabad on 5 May 2011. He was attacked by some mob in 2016.

Catholic Church titles
Preceded by Marampudi Joji	Archbishop of Hyderabad; 2011–2020	Succeeded by Anthony Poola
Preceded by Alphonso Beretta	Bishop of Warangal; 1987–2011	Succeeded by Udumala Bala Showreddy
