= Kilacheri =

Village in Tamil Nadu, India

Coordinates: 13°01′N 79°51′E

- Village
- Interactive map of Kilacheri
- Country: India
- State: Tamil Nadu
- District: Tiruvallur
- Taluka: Kadambatur
- Elevation: 50 m (160 ft)

Languages
  - Tamil: Official language
  - Telugu
- Pin Code: 631 402

Kilacheri is a village in Tamil Nadu, India. It is located in the Kadambatur taluka of the Tiruvallur district.

== Languages ==
Tamil is the official language of the village, but nearly 45% of the people speak Telugu language (mostly Kamma).

== Sacred Heart Church ==
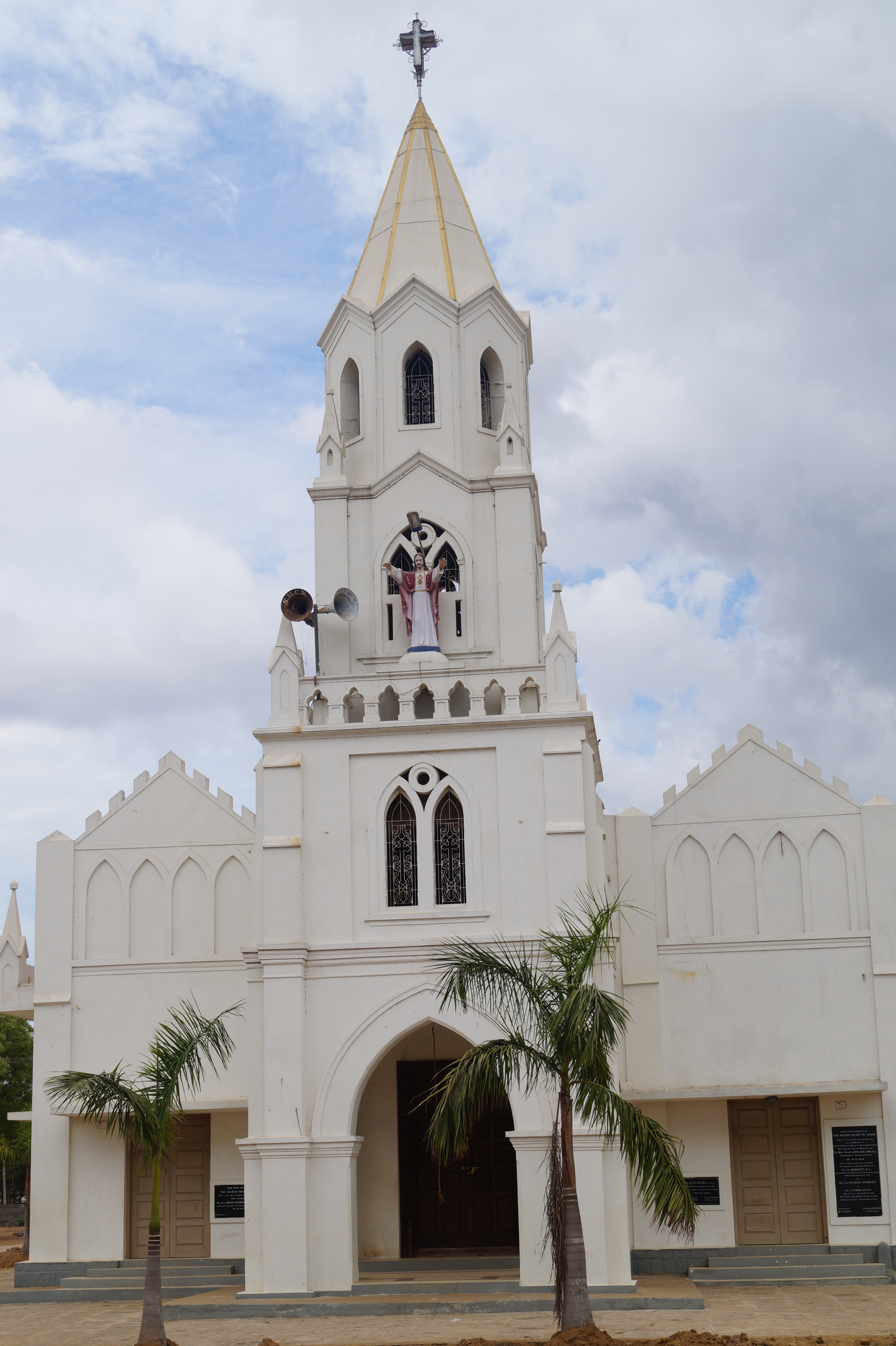
Sacred Heart Church Kilacheri

The Sacred Heart Church in Kilacheri was established in 1786. It is under the jurisdiction of the Roman Catholic Archdiocese of Madras and Mylapore. There are Stations of the Cross located around the church.

Telugu Christians celebrated their 300th jubilee on 11 December 2003 in this parish. Kilacheri parishioners celebrate their church festival on 28 May each year.

== Notable people ==
- Thatipatri Gnanamma, declared a Servant of God, died in Kilacheri.
- Archbishop Samineni Arulappa, an Indian Catholic clergyman and former Archbishop of Hyderabad, was born on 28 August 1924 in Kilacheri in present-day Tamil Nadu, then British India.
