= Law Enforcement Academy of the Republic of Uzbekistan =

State organization in Uzbekistan

- Motto in English: Latin: Et docere et discere servitute legis "Teach and learn to serve the law"
- Established: November 28, 2022; 3 years ago
- Director: Salom Samadov
- Students: 2000+
- Location: 100190, Tashkent city, Yunusobod district, Rixsiliy street, house 9. 41.374750612275804°N 69.27291724494884°E
- Website: www.proacademy.uz

The Law Enforcement Academy of the Republic of Uzbekistan is a higher education and research institution that trains personnel for the prosecutor's office and investigative bodies on the basis of a unified approach, with a system of continuous education: bachelor's, master's, doctoral, as well as retraining and advanced training. The Academy is headed by a head appointed and dismissed by the President of Uzbekistan.

== History of the Academy's Formation ==
A certain educational and scientific potential has been formed in the organs of the prosecutor's office of Uzbekistan. Before gaining independence, professional development of staff was carried out by the qualification upgrading courses of the Prosecutor's Office of the Uzbek SSR. By the Resolution No. 33 of the Cabinet of Ministers of the Republic of Uzbekistan dated January 24, 1992, issues on organizing the activities of the prosecutor's offices of the Republic of Uzbekistan, the Center for Resilience of Legislation and Professional Development of Prosecutorial and Investigative Workers was established under the Prosecutor General's Office of the Republic of Uzbekistan.

According to the Decree No. PD-727 of the President of the Republic of Uzbekistan dated November 7, 2007, the Higher Educational Courses of the General Prosecutor's Office of the Republic of Uzbekistan were established on the basis of the Center for Resilience of Legislation and Professional Development of Prosecutorial and Investigative Workers.

To create a modern system of training, retraining, and professional development of staff, and to strengthen the scientific and analytical potential of prosecutor office bodies, the Decree PD–5438 of the President of the Republic of Uzbekistan dated May 8, 2018 "On Fundamental Improvement of the System of Training, Retraining, and Professional Development of Prosecutor Staff" was adopted. According to the Decree, the Academy of the General Prosecutor's Office of the Republic of Uzbekistan was established on the basis of the Higher Educational Courses.

To radically increase the efficiency of the training and retraining system for highly qualified specialists in the field of investigation in response to the reforms and requirements of the time in Uzbekistan, the Decree PD–257 of the President of the Republic of Uzbekistan dated November 28, 2022, "On Implementing a New Quality System for Training Qualified Conductors of Criminal Investigations" was adopted. According to the Decree, the Law Enforcement Academy of the Republic of Uzbekistan was established on the basis of the Academy of the General Prosecutor's Office.

== Faculties ==
- Undergraduate faculty;
- Faculty of Masters;
- Faculty of retraining and advanced training;

== Departments ==
- The criminal law and criminology department;
- Preliminary investigation and inquiry department;
- Department of Criminalistics and forensic science;
- Department of prosecutorial activities and prosecutorial supervision;
- Department of operational search activity and cyber law;
- Department of ensuring prosecutor's authority in courts and conducting executive work;
- Department of state and legal Sciences;
- Department of professional psychology and management activities;
- Department of international law and human rights protection;
- Department of Social Sciences and Humanities;
- Department of language teaching;
- Department of military and physical training;
- Department of combating economic crimes and money laundering;

== Centers ==
- Center for scientific and practical research of law enforcement activities
- Center for coordination of scientific and innovative research and training of scientific personnel
- Scientific and Educational Center for Combating Corruption
- Office-registrar center
- Scientific and Methodological Center for Digital Forensics

== Divisions ==
- Division of organizational control and performance evaluation
- Personal security division
- Public relations division
- Legal division
- First and second division
- Accounting and financial planning division
- Affairs division
- Division of information and communication technologies and information security
- Division of Spirituality, Enlightenment and working with Youth
- Project management division
- Division of international cooperation
- Editorial and publishing division
- Division of e-learning
- Human resources division

== Management ==
- Educational and Methodological Department

== Scientific Research and Training of Scientific Personnel ==
#	Cefr	Scientific research
1	12.00.01	Theory and history of state and law. History of legal doctrines
2	12.00.07	Judicial power. Prosecutor supervision. Law enforcement activities. Advocacy
3	12.00.09	Criminal process. Criminalistics, operational-search law and forensic examination
4	12.00.12	Problems of corruption
5	12.00.03	Civil law. Entrepreneurial law. Family law. International private law
6	12.00.04	Civil procedural law. Economic procedural law. Arbitration process and mediation
7	12.00.05	Labor law. Social security law
8	12.00.08	Criminal law and criminology. Penal law

== Memorandums, agreements, protocols ==
Signed memorandums, agreements, protocols, roadmaps, action plan of the Academy of Law Enforcement Agencies of the Republic of Uzbekistan:

- Memorandum of Understanding and Cooperation in the Field of Personnel Training and Research Activities (copy) between the Academy of the Prosecutor General's Office of the Republic of Uzbekistan and the University of the Prosecutor's Office of the Russian Federation (Moscow, January 12, 2017).
- Memorandum of Understanding between the Higher Professional Development Courses of the Prosecutor General's Office of the Republic of Uzbekistan and the State Institute of Procuracy under the Supreme People's Procuracy of the People's Republic of China (Beijing, February 21, 2017) Newly Signed.
- Memorandum of Cooperation in the Field of Education and Research between the Higher Professional Development Courses of the Prosecutor General's Office of the Republic of Uzbekistan and the Academy of Law Enforcement Agencies under the Prosecutor General's Office of the Republic of Kazakhstan (Astana, August 3, 2017).
- Memorandum of Understanding and Cooperation between the Higher Professional Development Courses of the Prosecutor General's Office of the Republic of Uzbekistan and the Korean Law Institute (Tashkent, October 27, 2017).
- Memorandum of cooperation in the field of educational and research activities between the Higher Educational Courses of the Prosecutor General's Office of the Republic of Uzbekistan and the Siberian Institute of Management (Tashkent, December 1, 2017).
- Memorandum of cooperation in the field of educational and research activities between the Academy of the Prosecutor General's Office of the Republic of Uzbekistan and the educational institution "Institute for Retraining and Advanced Training of Judges, Prosecutor's Office Employees, Courts and Justice Institutions of the Belarusian State University" (Minsk, June 13, 2018).
- Memorandum of cooperation in the field of education and research activities between the Academy of the Prosecutor General's Office of the Republic of Uzbekistan and the state institution "Scientific and Practical Center for Problems of Strengthening Legislation and Law and Order of the Prosecutor General's Office of the Republic of Belarus" (Minsk, June 13, 2018).
- Agreement on cooperation between the Academy of the Prosecutor General's Office of the Republic of Uzbekistan and the National School of Magistracy of the French Republic. (Paris, July 2, 2018) newly signed.
- Agreement on cooperation between the Academy of the Prosecutor General's Office of the Republic of Uzbekistan and the "Buyuk Kelajak" National Research Center (Tashkent, October 24, 2018).
- Memorandum of Understanding between the Department of Sociology of Law, Lund University and the Academy of the Prosecutor General's Office of the Republic of Uzbekistan (Lund, January 2019).
- Memorandum of Understanding between the Alexander Institute of the University of Helsinki and the Academy of the Prosecutor General's Office of the Republic of Uzbekistan (Helsinki, January 25, 2019).
- Memorandum of Understanding between the Academy of the Prosecutor General's Office and the Republic of Korea Institute of Justice (Tashkent, May 13, 2019).
- Memorandum of Understanding between the Academy of the Prosecutor General's Office of the Republic of Uzbekistan and the National Academy of the Prosecutor's Office of Ukraine (Tashkent, May 16, 2019).
- Memorandum of Understanding between the Academy of the Prosecutor General's Office of the Republic of Uzbekistan and the Justice Academy of the Republic of Turkey (Tashkent, May 16, 2019).
- Memorandum of Cooperation between the Academy of the Prosecutor General's Office of the Republic of Uzbekistan and the Institute for Research and Advanced Training under the Ministry of Justice of Japan (Tashkent, July 25, 2019).
- Memorandum of Understanding on Cooperation in Education and Scientific Research between the Academy of the Prosecutor General's Office of the Republic of Uzbekistan and Elsevier (Tashkent, September 2019).
- Memorandum of cooperation in the field of education and research between the Academy of the Prosecutor General's Office of the Republic of Uzbekistan and the Academy of Public Administration under the President of the Republic of Kazakhstan (Tashkent, November 14, 2019).
- Agreement on cooperation between the Federal State Budgetary Institution of Higher Education "Russian Academy of National Economy and Public Administration under the President of the Russian Federation" and the Academy of the Prosecutor General's Office of the Republic of Uzbekistan. (Tashkent, 2019);
- Agreement on cooperation between the Academy of the Prosecutor General's Office of the Republic of Uzbekistan and the Moscow Academy of the Investigative Committee of the Russian Federation. (VKS, May 27, 2020);
- Agreement between the Academy of the Prosecutor General's Office of the Republic of Uzbekistan and the autonomous non-profit organization "International Educational and Methodological Center for Financial Monitoring" on cooperation in the field of training personnel in the field of combating the legalization (laundering) of proceeds from crime, the financing of terrorism and the proliferation of weapons of mass destruction. (VKS, September 29, 2020);
- Memorandum of Cooperation between the Academy of the Prosecutor General's Office of the Republic of Uzbekistan and the Uzbekistan branch of the Association of German Folk Universities (Tashkent, November 2020);
- Agreement on cooperation between the Academy of the Prosecutor General's Office of the Republic of Uzbekistan and the Institute of Advanced Training and Retraining of the Investigative Committee of the Republic of Belarus. (VKS, May 27, 2021);
- Agreement on cooperation between the Academy of the Prosecutor General's Office of the Republic of Uzbekistan and the federal state higher educational institution "St. Petersburg Academy of the Investigative Committee of the Russian Federation". (VKS, May 27, 2021);
- Memorandum of Understanding and Cooperation in the Field of Personnel Training and Research Activities between the Academy of the Prosecutor General's Office of the Republic of Uzbekistan and the University of the Prosecutor's Office of the Russian Federation (VKS, August 22, 2022);
- Memorandum of Cooperation in the field of education and research activities between the Academy of the Prosecutor General's Office of the Republic of Uzbekistan and the Center for Advanced Training of Prosecutor-Investigative Officers under the Prosecutor General's Office of the Republic of Kyrgyzstan (VKS, August 22, 2022);
- Memorandum of Understanding between the Academy of the Prosecutor General's Office of the Republic of Uzbekistan and the Turkish Academy of Justice (20.09.2022, Tashkent city) + 2 licenses;
- Memorandum of Cooperation between the Academy of the Prosecutor General's Office of the Republic of Uzbekistan and the Scientific Training Center under the Prosecutor General's Office of the Republic of Azerbaijan (VKS, November 1, 2022);
- Memorandum of Understanding on the Turkish Judicial and Legal Education Network (copy) (12.12.2022, Istanbul);
- Memorandum of Understanding between the Law Enforcement Academy of the Republic of Uzbekistan and the Institute of Criminology, University of Ljubljana, Slovenia (August 2023);
- Memorandum of Understanding between the Law Enforcement Academy of the Republic of Uzbekistan and the Faculty of Criminal Justice and Security, University of Maribor, Slovenia (September 2023);
- Agreement on cooperation between the Law Enforcement Academy of the Republic of Uzbekistan and the National School of Magistracy of the French Republic (December 1, 2023);
- Memorandum of Understanding between the Law Enforcement Academy of the Republic of Uzbekistan and the State Institute of Procuracy under the Supreme People's Procuracy of the People's Republic of China (Tashkent, June 4, 2024);
- Memorandum of Understanding between the Law Enforcement Academy of the Republic of Uzbekistan and the University of Gdansk, Poland (October 2024);
- Indian NFSU (Tashkent, October 28, 2024);
- Saint Petersburg State University (Tashkent, November 28, 2024);

Event plans

- Action plan for cooperation between the University of the Prosecutor's Office of the Russian Federation and the Academy of the Prosecutor General's Office of the Republic of Uzbekistan for 2020;
- Action plan (roadmap) for the implementation of the Agreement on cooperation between the Federal State Budgetary Institution of Higher Education “Russian Academy of National Economy and Public Administration under the President of the Russian Federation” and the Academy of the Prosecutor General's Office of the Republic of Uzbekistan for 2019-2020;

== Heads of the Academy ==
- From 2018-2022 - Kolenko Yevgeny Vyacheslavovich.
- From 2023 to the present - Samadov Salom Ismatovich.
