= Swami Premananda =

Swami Premananda may mean:

- Swami Premananda of Trichy (1951–2011), a guru from Sri Lanka living in India, who was convicted of multiple counts of rape and a murder
- Baburam Maharaj (Swami Premananda) (1861–1918), a guru from Bengal
