= Dhaman Kumar Karanam =

Roman Catholic Bishop of Nalgonda, India

His Excellency Dhaman Kumar Karanam MSFS
- Bishop of Nalgonda
- Church: Latin Church
- Province: Hyderabad
- Diocese: Nalgonda
- Appointed: 17 February 2024; 2 years ago
- Predecessor: Joji Govindu
- Previous post: Pastor of Essen (Oldenburg) (2020–2024)

Orders
- Ordination: 17 October 1990; 35 years ago

Personal details
- Born: 16 November 1963 (age 62) Vijayanagaram, Andhra Pradesh, India
- Education: Loyola College (BTh)

Dhaman Kumar Karanam (Note: In this Telugu name, the surname is Karanam.) MSFS is an Indian prelate of the Catholic Church who has served as Bishop of Nalgonda since 2024.

== Biography ==
Pope Francis appointed Karanam as Bishop of Nalgonda in 2024.

== Abuse allegations ==
On April 24, 2025, the Roman Catholic Diocese of Münster in Germany announced that allegations of sexual abuse had been made against the Bishop of Nalgonda. These relate to the years 2005 to 2007. The Münster diocesan official informed the public prosecutor's office in Münster and Dicastery for the Doctrine of the Faith, and the Archbishop of Hyderabad, Cardinal Anthony Poola, as the responsible Metropolitan. Dhaman Kumar Karanam has also been banned from exercising priestly duties in the Diocese of Münster until further notice.

== Explanatory notes ==
Catholic Church titles
| Preceded by Joji Govindu | Bishop of Nalgonda; 17 February 2024 – present | Incumbent |
