= Joseph Rajappa =

Roman Catholic bishop (1918–1989)

Bishop Joseph Rajappa, RCM Doctor of Divinity (Honoris causa)
- The Most Reverend
- Church: Catholic Church
- Diocese: Kurnool (1967-1988); Khammam (1988-1989)
- Appointed: Kurnool (June 12, 1967); Khammam (January 18, 1988)
- In office: Kurnool (12 June 1967 - 18 January 1988); Khammam (18 January 1988 - 27 December 1989)
- Predecessor: Position created
- Successor: Mathew Cheriankunnel (Kurnool); Marampudi Joji (Khammam)
- Other posts: Parish Priest, St. Mary's Minor Basilica, Shivajinagara (1945-1946)
- Previous posts: Principal, St. Mary’s High School, KGF (1948-1957); St. Aloysius High School, Cox Town (1957-1967)

Orders
- Ordination: 19 December 1945 by Thomas Pothacamury
- Consecration: 7 September 1967 by Duraisamy Simon Lourdusamy
- Rank: Bishop

Personal details
- Born: November 3, 1918 Anekal, Kingdom of Mysore
- Died: December 27, 1989 (aged 71) St. John's Hospital, Bangalore
- Buried: Anekal, Karnataka
- Denomination: Christianity
- Profession: Priesthood
- Education: B. Th. (Urbaniana); B.A. (Mysore)
- Alma mater: Bangalore; Archdiocesan Minor Seminary, St. Mary's Town; St. Joseph's College, Museum Road; St. Peter's Regional Seminary, Malleshwaram
- Motto: Latin: ORATIONE ET PRAEDICATIONE VERBI

Styles of Joseph Rajappa
- Reference style: The Most Reverend
- Spoken style: Your Excellency

Rev. Dr. Joseph Rajappa

Joseph Rajappa (3 November 1918 - 27 December 1989) was a Priest of the Roman Catholic Church in India. He was the first Bishop in Roman Catholic Diocese of Kurnool (1967-1988) and in Roman Catholic Diocese of Khammam (1988-1989). He hailed from Anekal in erstwhile Mysore state.

He underwent spiritual formation St. Peter's Pontifical Seminary, Bangalore.

Religious titles
Preceded by Position created	Roman Catholic Diocese of Kurnool; Bishop - in - Kurnool; 1967-1988	Succeeded by C. Mathew, PIME
Preceded by Position created	Roman Catholic Diocese of Khammam; Bishop - in - Khammam; 1988-1989	Succeeded by M. Joji, RCM
