= Swami Premananda (guru) =

Indian convicted of rape and murder

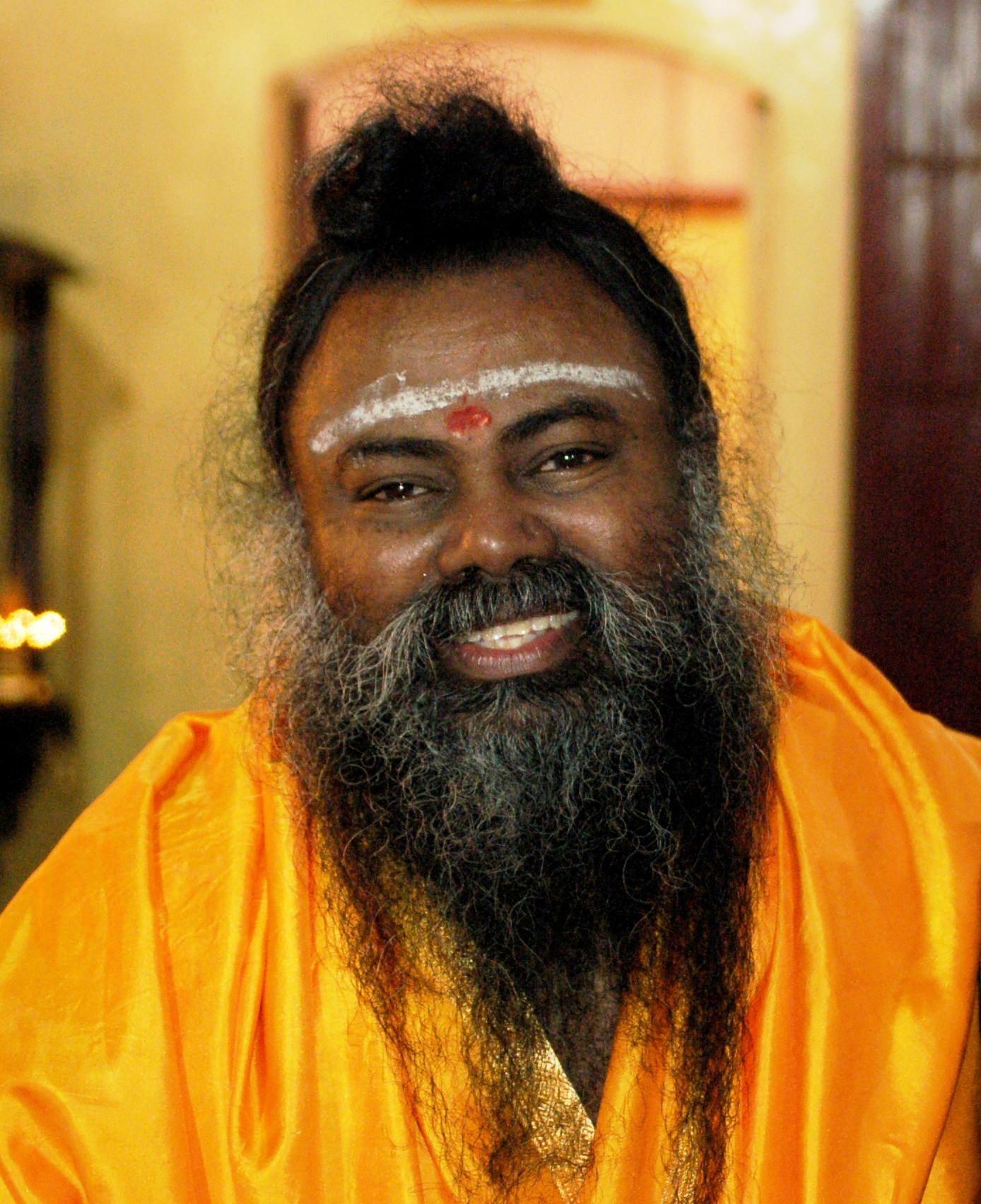
- Born: Prem Kumar Somasundaram; 17 November 1951; Matale, Ceylon
- Died: 21 February 2011 (aged 59); Cuddalore Central Prison, India
- Other names: Ravi Swamy; Tiger Swamy; Kutti Sai Baba(Little Sai Baba)
- Occupation: Spiritual guru
- Website: sripremananda.org

Prem Kumar (17 November 1951 – 21 February 2011), better known as Swami Premananda, was a Sri-Lankan born Indian religious monk who founded the Premananda ashram. He was convicted of multiple counts of rape and a murder in 1997.

== Life and work ==
Originally an Indian Tamil from Sri Lanka, Kumar had an ashram and orphanage in his birthplace Matale. During his years in Matale, Sri Lanka he was popularly known as 'Ravi', meaning 'sun', as he had a radiant face. He moved to India with his followers in 1983 to escape the Sri Lankan Civil War, bringing with him undocumented Sri Lankan orphans who had been in his care. He initially opened an ashram in a rented building in Tiruchirappalli, then moved to Fatimanagar in 1989. The ashram there covered 150 acres of land with plantations of flowers, fruit, and teak. The ashram served as a shelter for women and orphan children. In India, he was fondly called 'Kutti Sai Baba' which means little Sai Baba in Tamil as he had a hairstyle similar to that of Sathya Sai Baba during his early days. About 200 people lived in the ashram, most of Sri Lankan origin. Branches of the ashram later opened in the UK, Switzerland, Belgium, Mexico, and other countries.

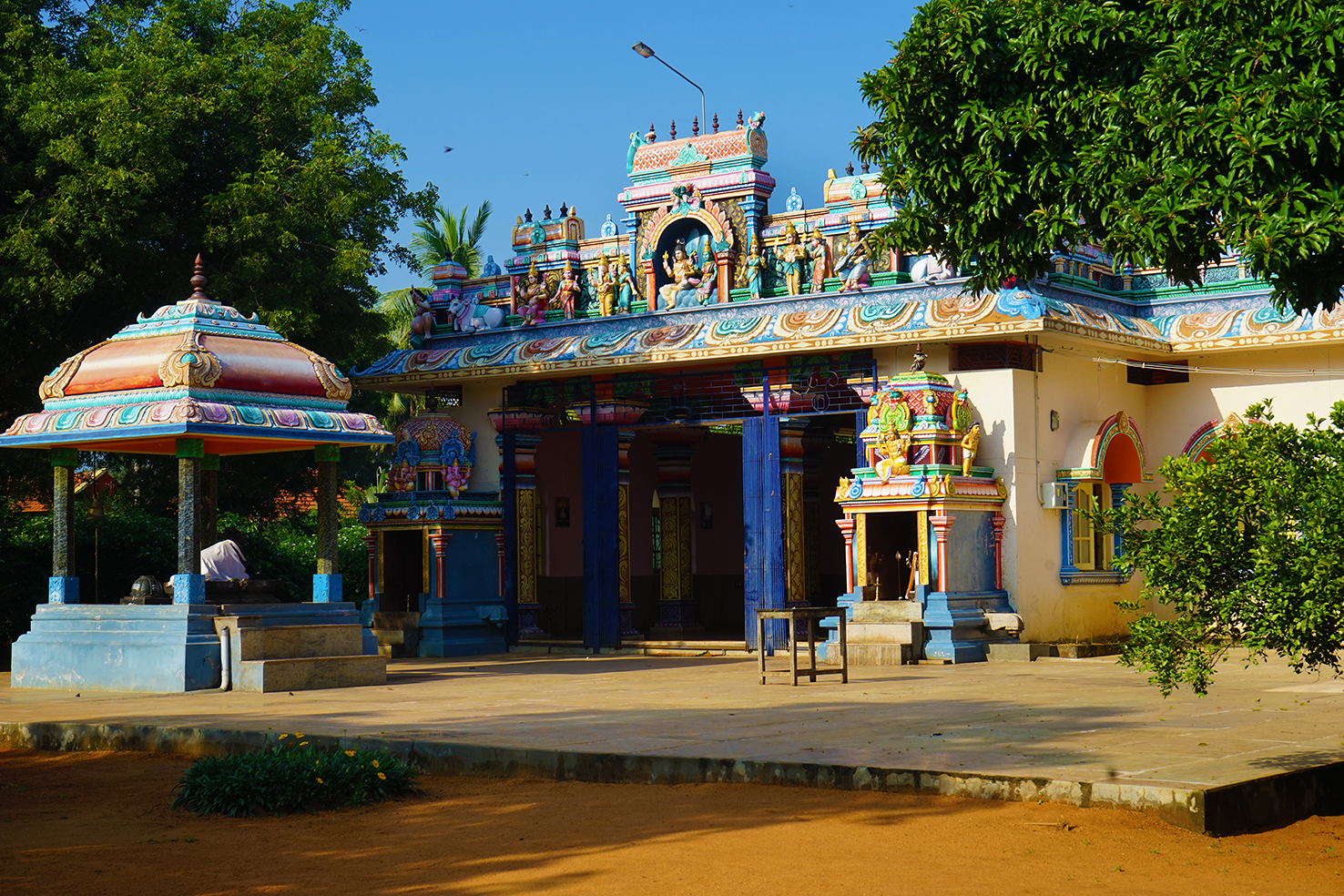
Sri Premeshvarar temple

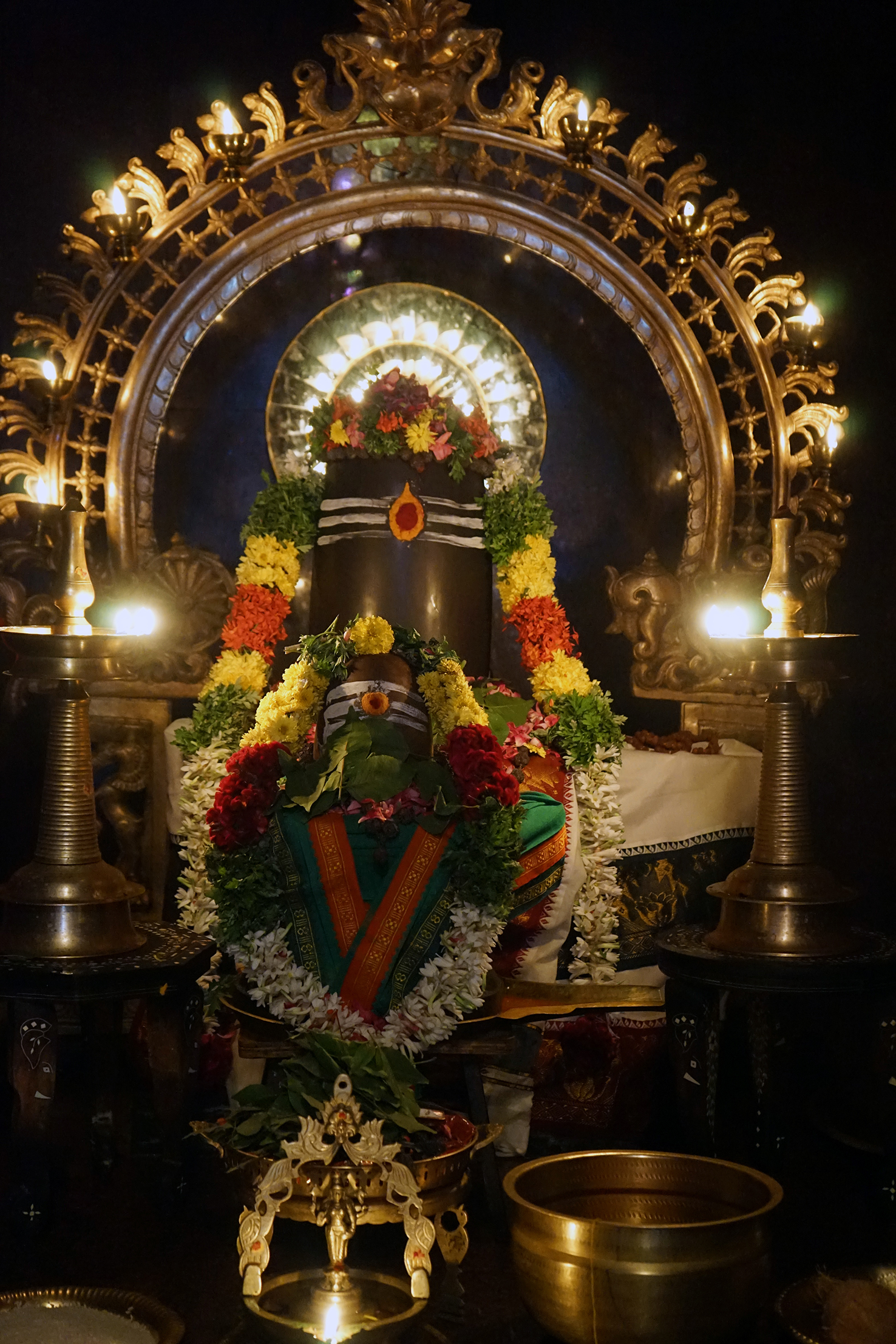
Swami Premananda's samadhi

== Accusations and trial ==
In 1994, one of the girls living in the ashram, Arul Jyothi, was said to have escaped and reported that she had been raped and was pregnant. The All India Democratic Women's Association provided moral support and legal aid to the victims. On 15 November 1994, the police started an investigation. Two ashram residents also reported that another, called Ravi, had been murdered for attempting to expose the happenings at the ashram.

Trial took place in the sessions court in Pudukkottai, presided over by a woman judge, R. Banumathi. Noted criminal lawyer Ram Jethmalani was among those representing the swami. The defence claimed that Premananda had divine powers and was capable of performing miracles. To debunk this myth, an illusionist was invited into the courtroom.

Ram Jethmalani argued that the women had consented to sex. The court noted that in some cases the consent was obtained by deceit, such as promising a cure for ailments such as asthma or by saying that sex with the swami was "service to God". The court also noted that some of the girls had been threatened with dire consequences and that some of the victims were below the age of consent (16 at the time of trial) when they were raped. Jethmalani also said that the trial was unfair because witnesses and the accused had been subjected to police brutality.

The alleged murder victim's remains were found buried on the ashram premises and were presented as evidence.

DNA samples from Arul Jyothi, her alleged aborted fetus, and Premananda were also introduced as evidence. The prosecution argued that the results established his paternity. The defense hired an expert witness from the UK, Wilson Wall, who took DNA evidence back to the UK and analyzed it; his results were that Premananda was not the father and that analysis by the Indian scientists was mishandled.

== Conviction ==
Premananda was sentenced to double life imprisonment and fined ₹67.3 lakhs for 13 counts of rape, molestations of two girls and murder. Failure to pay the fine was to carry an additional term of 32 years and 9 months. He was also convicted of cheating the residents of his ashram, which carried another one-year sentence. Six others were also found guilty of conspiracy to commit rapes and destroying evidence. Five were given life sentences. In view of the severity of the crimes, the judge denied them any future remission of their sentences or amnesty by any state or central government.

Premananda appeared unperturbed by the sentences and while talking to reporters, said: "Truth will ultimately triumph".

== Aftermath ==
In January 2000, the Madras High Court ordered that ₹36.4 lakhs from Premananda's frozen accounts should be placed in a fixed deposit for three years and the resulting interest should be paid to the victims as compensation. The original guilty verdict was appealed to the Madras High Court and the appeal was rejected in December 2002.

In April 2005, the Supreme Court of India rejected an appeal. On 5 February 2009, the Madras High Court rejected a habeas corpus petition, keeping in view the recommendations of the district sessions judge at the time of conviction and the previous Supreme Court order. On 26 June 2010, however, the same court accepted Premananda's petition requesting a three-month parole to undergo medical treatment.

As of 2005 a European named Doris was running the ashram who said that Premananda was innocent. In March 1997, Aruljyothy, one of the girls who had been taken away for interrogation, stated in court that the girls' testimony against Swami Premananda had been made under torture.

== Death ==
Premananda died on 21 February 2011 of acute liver failure, while being held in Cuddalore Central Prison. Until his death, he continued to maintain that he was innocent.

== Legacy ==
On 16 November 2014, Swami Premananda's birth anniversary was observed by his devotees at the residence of C. V. Vigneswaran in Colombo, Sri Lanka. On 22 February 2015, the Swami Premananda International Conference was held in Colombo. It was attended by A. T. Ariyaratne, founder of the Sarvodaya Shramadana Movement, D. M. Swaminathan, a Sri Lankan Tamil Cabinet Minister, C. V. Vigneswaran, the Chief Minister of the Northern Province, and about 50 delegates from various countries including Argentina, Belgium, France, the Netherlands, Italy, Nepal, the UK, the US, Sweden, Switzerland, India and Poland.
