= Diocese of Warangal =

Roman Catholic diocese in Telangana, India

Coordinates: 17.9837°N 79.5246°E

Diocese of Warangal Dioecesis Varangalensis वारंगल के सूबा

Location
- Country: India
- Ecclesiastical province: Hyderabad
- Metropolitan: Hyderabad

Statistics
- Area: 27,702 km^{2} (10,696 sq mi)
- Population: Total; Catholics: (as of 2023); 9,360,110; 75,502 (0.8%)
- Parishes: 68

Information
- Denomination: Catholic Church
- Sui iuris church: Latin Church
- Rite: Roman Rite
- Established: 22 December 1952; 73 years ago
- Cathedral: Our Lady of Fatima Cathedral, Fatimanagar
- Secular priests: 145 (71 Diocesan, 74 Religious Orders)

Current leadership
- Pope: Leo XIV
- Bishop: Vijaya Paul Reddy Duggimpudi
- Metropolitan Archbishop: Anthony Poola

The Roman Catholic Diocese of Warangal (Latin: Varangalen(sis)) is a diocese located in the city of Warangal in the ecclesiastical province of Hyderabad in India.

== History ==
- 22 December 1952: Established as Diocese of Warangal from the Diocese of Hyderabad

== Leadership ==
Bishops of Warangal (Roman Rite)

- Alphonso Beretta, P.I.M.E. (8 January 1953 – 30 November 1985), retired
- Thumma Bala (17 November 1986 – 12 March 2011), appointed Archbishop of Hyderabad
- Udumala Bala Showreddy (23 April 2013 – 8 February 2025), appointed Archbishop of Visakhapatnam
  - Administrator Vijaya Paul Reddy Duggimpudi (5 April 2025 – 9 May 2026)
- Vijaya Paul Reddy Duggimpudi (9 May 2026 – Present)

Other Priests of this Diocese who became Bishop

- Jaya Rao Polimera (1992-2013), appointed Bishop of Eluru
