= Diocese of Nalgonda =

Roman Catholic diocese in Telangana, India

Coordinates: 17.0425°N 79.2663°E

Diocese of Nalgonda Dioecesis Nalgondaensis नलगोंडा के सूबा
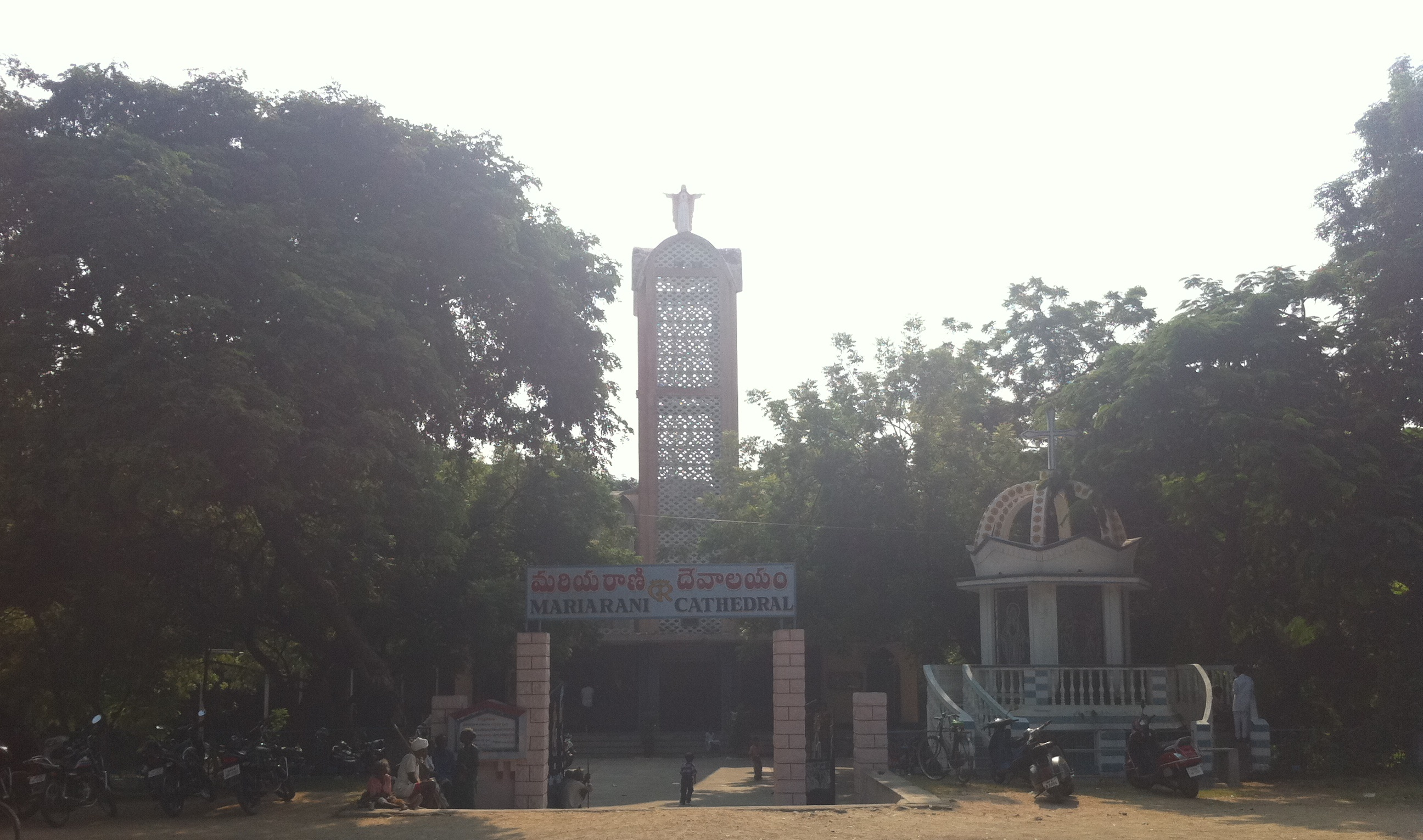
- Mariarani Cathedral, Nalgonda

Location
- Country: India
- Ecclesiastical province: Hyderabad
- Metropolitan: Hyderabad

Statistics
- Area: 32,161 km^{2} (12,417 sq mi)
- Population: Total; Catholics: (as of 2004); 5,622,168; 66,997 (1.2%)

Information
- Rite: Latin Rite
- Cathedral: Mariarani Cathedral (Cathedral of Mary Queen of the Apostles) in Nalgonda

Current leadership
- Pope: Leo XIV
- Bishop: Dhaman Kumar Karanam
- Metropolitan Archbishop: Thumma Bala

The Roman Catholic Diocese of Nalgonda (Latin: Dioecesis Nalgondaensis) is a diocese located in the city of Nalgonda in the ecclesiastical province of Hyderabad in India.

== History ==
- 31 May 1976: Established as Diocese of Nalgonda from the Metropolitan Archdiocese of Hyderabad and Diocese of Warangal

== Leadership ==
- Bishops of Nalgonda (Latin Rite)
  - Bishop Dhaman Kumar Karanam MSFS (17 February 2024 – present)
  - Bishop Joji Govindu (21 April 1997 – 31 July 2021)
  - Bishop Innayya Chinna Addagatla (17 April 1989 – 1 July 1993)
  - Bishop Mathew Cheriankunnel PIME (31 May 1976 – 22 December 1986)
