= NFSU =

NFSU may refer to:

- National Forensic Sciences University, Gujarat, India
- Need for Speed: Underground, a 2003 racing video game
- Need for Speed: Undercover, a 2008 racing video game
- Need for Speed Unbound, a 2022 racing video game
