= Lok Nayak Jayaprakash Narayan National Institute of Criminology & Forensic Science =

Forensic Sciences University in Delhi

- Type: Public
- Established: 1972; 54 years ago
- Affiliations: National Forensic Sciences University
- Director: Dr. Purvi Pokhariyal
- Location: New Delhi, Delhi, India
- Website: www.nicfs.gov.in

National Forensic Science University, New Delhi (Lok Nayak Jayprakash Narayan National Institute of Criminology & Forensic Science) is the campus of the National Forensic Sciences University and an Institution of National Importance under the Ministry of Home Affairs, Government of India as recognised by an act of the Parliament of India. It is one of the Central Police Organization (CPO) of the country. It specializes in teaching criminology, cybersecurity, digital forensics and forensic science and is located in New Delhi, India. The institute was established by Government of India in 1972 within the Bureau of Police Research and Development following recommendations of the University Grants Commission (UGC).

The institute was formerly known as "Institute of Criminology and Forensic Science" and came into existence on 4 January 1972. The institute has trained around 14000 officers from Police, Judiciary, Prisons, Prosecution, Defence, Customs, Forest, Medical, Public-Sector Undertakings, Nationalized Banks as well as Scientists from Central and State Forensic Science Laboratories. It was renamed after Indian independence activist Jayprakash Narayan in 2003. On 1 October 2020 it became a formal campus of NFSU under NFSU, Gandhinagar. Dr. J. M. Vyas is the Vice Chancellor and Dr Purvi Pokhariyal is the Campus Director.

== History ==
The UGC set up an expert committee to suggest steps to bring Criminology and Forensic Science into the general stream of university education, based on the resolution taken at a Symposium organized by UNESCO in London in 1955. It suggested that systematic understanding of Criminology and Forensic Science was necessary for Law Enforcement Officers and the Universities should be encouraged to include these disciplines in their curriculum.

Following recommendations of the UGC to set up a Central Institute for teaching Criminology and Forensic Science, Government of India established the institute in 1972 within the Bureau of Police Research and Development. In 1976 it became an independent Department directly under the Ministry of Home Affairs with a wider mandate which included promotion of Criminology and Forensic Science. The Institute was upgraded as a National Institute in 1991 and in 2003 the Institute was renamed after Lok Nayak Jayaprakash Narayan.

Over the years, NICFS has trained more than 1,000 officers from Police, Judiciary, Prisons, Prosecution, Defence, Customs, Forest, Medical, Public Sector Undertakings, Nationalized Banks as well as Scientists from Central and State Forensic Science Laboratories.

== Vision ==
The Vision of the Institute is To be a World class Academic Institution.

== Mission ==
- Promoting Criminology and Forensic Sciences through Education, Research and Training by setting new benchmarks.
- Helping develop a Problem Solving approach among officers of Criminal Justice System by providing a platform for interaction cutting across boundaries.
- Sensitizing officers of Criminal Justice System and Forensic Scientists to harness potentials of science in criminal justice.
- Advancing International cooperation and appreciation in crime control through Academic Activities and Collaborations.

== Objectives ==
- To act as national Institute towards advancement of the subjects of Criminology and Forensic Science towards this end to provide and undertake research in Criminology and Forensic Science.
- To act as a center of in-service training of officers in police, judiciary and correctional services and also others engaged in the Criminal Justice System and its allied fields and to provide facilities for certificate and diploma courses in the various subjects.
- To act as a reference body in the fields of Criminology and Forensic Science for all National as well as International institutions and provide all types of information to workers engaged in the various studies in these fields.
- To promote International understanding and goodwill by providing facilities for training and research in Criminology and Forensic Science to other countries.

== Institute ==
The LNJN National Institute of Criminology & Forensic Science is located in Rohini locality of the National Capital of New Delhi. The institute has 8 acres of campus housing administrative wing and teaching areas. The main building accommodates several lecture theaters, seminar rooms and an auditorium. There are residential facilities for faculty and staff. The institute also has an instrumentation wing and several laboratories with state of the art equipment. An Indian Police Service Officer of the rank of Director General of Police is the Director of the Institute.

== Courses ==
- B.Tech - M.Tech (Integrated) Computer Science and Engineering in Cybersecurity- Duration of this course is 5 Years.
- B.Sc - M.Sc (Integrated) Forensic science - Duration of this course is 5 years.
- BBA-MBA (Integrated)(with Specialization in Forensic Accounting and Fraud Investigation / Financial Management/ Business Analytics and Intelligence) - Duration of this course is 5 Years.
- BBA-LLB.(Hons.)(Integrated) - Duration of this course is 5 Years.
- B.Sc. - M.Sc. Criminology and Forensic Science(Integrated) - Duration of this course is 5 years.
- M.Sc. Digital Forensics and Information Security - Duration of this course is 2 Years and Eligibility Criteria is Bachelor's Degree from CS/IT Background.
- M.Sc. Forensic Science - Duration of this course is 2 years and only Science Graduates can apply to this course.
- Master of Arts(M.A.) Criminology - Duration of this course is 2 years and graduates can apply to this course.
- M. Sc. Homeland Security - Duration of this course is 2 years and graduates can apply to this course.
- M. Phil. Clinical Psychology - Duration of this course is 2 years and post graduates can apply to this course.
- PG Diploma in Cyber Crime & Law - Duration of this course is 1 year and graduates can apply to this course.
- PG Diploma in Victimology & Victim Assistance - Duration of this course is 1 year and graduates can apply to this course.
- PG Diploma in Security Management - Duration of this course is 1 year and graduates can apply to this course.
- PG Diploma Crime Scene Photography - Duration of this course is 1 year and graduates can apply to this course.
- PG Diploma Fingerprint Science - Duration of this course is 1 year and graduates can apply to this course.
- PG Diploma in Forensic Document Examination - Duration of this course is 1 year and graduates can apply to this course.
- LL. M. (Criminal Law and Criminal Justice Administration) - Duration of this course is 1 year.
- Diploma Canine Forensics - Duration of this course is 1 year and graduates can apply to this course.

== See also ==
- Institute of Forensic Science, Mumbai
- Central Forensic Science Laboratory
- National Forensic Sciences University
