= Samineni Arulappa =

Indian Catholic archbishop (1924–2005)

The Most Reverend Samineni Arulappa
- Archbishop of Hyderabad
- See: Roman Catholic Archdiocese of Hyderabad
- Installed: 6 December 1971
- Term ended: 29 January 2000
- Predecessor: Archbishop G. Joseph Mark
- Successor: Archbishop M. Joji

Orders
- Ordination: 6 May 1950
- Consecration: 13 February 1972

Personal details
- Born: 28 August 1924 Kilacheri, British India present day Tamil Nadu, India
- Died: 13 February 2005 (aged 80) Secunderabad, Andhra Pradesh
- Denomination: Catholic Church
- Parents: Rajamma and Samineni Chinnaiah
- Motto: Love and Serve

Archbishop Samineni Arulappa (28 August 1924 – 13 February 2005), also known as S. Arulappa, was an Indian Catholic clergyman who served as the Archbishop of Hyderabad from December 1971 through January 2000. The youngest priest to be consecrated to such a high office, he was also the longest-serving Catholic archbishop in India. He was also the first archbishop who had the honour of being consecrated by Pope Paul VI in Rome.

"Love and Serve" was his motto.

== Early years ==
Arulappa was born on 28 August 1924 in a Kamma family to Rajamma and Chinnaiah in Kilacheri in present-day Tamil Nadu, then British India. He was the youngest born in a family of four sisters, two of whom are nuns, and two brothers. He was brought up in an atmosphere of strict discipline by his mother, who wanted to see her only son become a priest. The Archbishop reminisced that his mother looked forward to the day when she could see him as a priest, but both his parents died before he was ordained a priest. He was supported by his brother Samineni Anthaiah.

== Divinity and pastorship ==
=== Seminary studies ===
Arulappa evinced keen interest in pursuing the vocation of priesthood and also assisted the priests as an altar boy during his childhood. He was sent to the Kandy Pontifical College (known as the Papal Seminary) in Kandy, Ceylon, to pursue theological studies. The Papal Seminary awarded Arulappa licentiate degrees in philosophy and theology (L. Ph. & L. Th.) on successfully completing his studies there.

=== Ordination and professorship ===
Arulappa was ordained a priest on 6 May 1950 by Bishop Ignatius Glennie, S.J., the then Bishop of Trincomalee.

He joined the faculty of the Archdiocesan Minor & Major Seminaries in Madras and taught Latin and philosophy, besides being the rector of the seminary.

Arulappa also served as a parish priest in two parishes and was principal of St. Joseph's Anglo-Indian Boys' High School in Madras.

He was sent to Oxford University, the oldest university in England, for post-graduate studies in public and social administration.

Later, Arulappa was appointed the rector of Christ Hall Seminary, a philosophate in Karumathur in Madurai, and served as its rector.

== Archbishopric ==
- Archdiocese of Hyderabad

=== Background ===
G. Joseph Mark was the fifth bishop of Hyderabad and later became archbishop when the diocese of Hyderabad was elevated to an archdiocese on 19 September 1953. With his death on 28 February 1971, the office of the archbishop fell vacant.

=== Appointment ===
Fr. S. Arulappa of the archdiocese of Madras-Mylapore was brought in and nominated to the archbishopric of Hyderabad.

On 6 December 1971, he was appointed the archbishop of Hyderabad. He was consecrated principally by Pope Paul VI and co-consecrators Cardinals Alfrink and Conway on 13 February 1972 at St. Peter's Basilica in Rome.

He was installed as the archbishop of Hyderabad on 19 March 1972 in the All Saints' School Grounds in Abids, Hyderabad.

Arulappa recollected that on 12 December 1971, he received a letter from the Apostolic Nunciature stating that he had been nominated as the archbishop of Hyderabad, and all that he could do was just kneel down and pray like never before.

=== Works ===
==== Parishes ====
When the Archbishop took over the reins of the archdiocese, there were 18 parishes. At the time of his retirement, there were 60 parishes, which speaks to the work he undertook.

About 85 priests were ordained in the archdiocese during his archbishopric.

==== Arrival of the religious congregations ====
Altogether, 37 religious congregations were invited to work in the archdiocese.

==== Educational institutions ====
Apart from the formation of the Hyderabad Archdiocese Education Society (HAES), 35 high schools and 14 junior and degree colleges were opened.

==== Structures ====
- Arulappa was instrumental in founding the Hyderabad Archdiocese Social Service Society (HASSS) in 1973 which is involved in diverse developmental activities cutting across religious lines.
- Pastoral centre
- Hyderabad Archdiocese Education Society (HAES)
- Amruthavani Communications Centre
- Andhra Pradesh Social Service Society

==== Missionaries of Charity ====
In 1974, the Archbishop visited Calcutta for a CBCI meeting and proceeded to invite Blessed Mother Teresa to work in the archdiocese of Hyderabad. In 1978, the Missionaries of Charity started arriving in Secunderabad, and on 15 August 1978, the work of the Missionaries of Charity was inaugurated. In January 1979, when Blessed Mother Teresa arrived in Hyderabad for the first time, the Archbishop was there to receive her and later took her to the residence of the then-Chief Minister of Andhra Pradesh, Dr. Marri Chenna Reddy, who offered a part of a hospital in new Bhoiguda in Secunderabad for establishing a home for the dying destitute.

==== Erection of new dioceses ====
During the archbishopric of Arulappa, the region of Andhra Pradesh saw the erection of five new dioceses.

== Relations with the government ==
Archbishop Arulappa did maintain good relations with the government. But when it came to laxity on the part of the government, he used to take them to task through the media.

Secunderabad hosts the President of India annually. Rashtrapati Nilayam in Secunderabad is home to the President during summers. The Archbishop used to call on them during the President's sojourn to Secunderabad. In 1982, President Giani Zail Singh visited St. Mary's Church in Secunderabad on the invitation of the Archbishop.

== On secularism ==
The Archbishop was known for his secular outlook. He remarked that one should have respect for other religions and used to maintain cordial relations with leaders of other religious affiliations and was even invited to various fora. He spoke at spiritual conferences organised by Swami Ranganathananda of the Ramakrishna Mission and Swami Chidananda Saraswati of the Divine Life Society. He organised a number of inter-religious dialogues with various faiths, according to his grand nephew P.L. Arulraj, state youth wing general secretary of the Bharatiya Janata Party (BJP) of Andhra Pradesh.

== On ecumenism and unity of the Church ==
In 1973, Arulappa took part in the inauguration of the new campus of the Andhra Christian Theological College, formed in 1964, which consisted of the Anglican, Baptist, Congregational, Lutheran, Methodist and Wesleyan Societies and involved the seminarians from St. John's Regional Seminary to take part in the inaugural cultural programme.

In 1977, he shared a dais with the global evangelist Rev. Dr. Billy Graham and his associate Rev. Dr. Akbar Abdul Haqq during their conventions in Secunderabad. At another convention, he proposed a common Eucharist among the Catholic and Protestant churches. The Archbishop never turned down any invitation extended by the different church societies belonging to either Catholic, Orthodox or Protestant backgrounds. He considered himself a father to all.

The yearly United Christmas Celebrations organised by laymen of Catholic, Orthodox and Protestant backgrounds was the brainchild of the lay Methodists of Hyderabad. Together, they approached the three bishops resident in Hyderabad, namely, Archbishop S. Arulappa, Bishop Victor Premasagar (CSI Bishop-in-Medak), and Bishop Elia Peter (Methodist Bishop of Hyderabad Regional Conference) who gave their nod, and thus was born the United Christmas Celebrations, a yearly event to which either the Governor or Chief Minister of Andhra Pradesh are invited with participation by all the churches of Hyderabad.

== Membership ==
ex-officio

- Catholic Bishop's Conference of India
- Andhra Pradesh Bishop's Council
- Chairman of the CBCI Commission of Education

== Honours ==
=== Episcopal silver jubilee ===
On 8 February 1997, the Archbishop celebrated his episcopal silver jubilee in the grounds of St. Mary's High School in Secunderabad. Eight regional bishops were also present. The book Want to be a Hero authored by the Archbishop was also released.

A Silver Jubilee Souvenir describing the achievements of Archbishop Arulappa was released by the Archdiocese of Hyderabad, entitled Archbishop Arulappa completes a Quarter Century, with articles by:

- Msgr. B. Julian
- Rev. Fr. J. Studen
- Dr. B. F. Showrayya
- Sri. B. S. Innaiah
- Smt. Evonne Maria
- Ms. Corinne Campos
- Ms. Christina Andrews
- Ms. Nirmala Nair

=== Priestly golden jubilee ===
On 6 May 2000, the Archbishop celebrated his priestly golden jubilee.

== Retirement ==
On 29 January 2000, Arulappa retired from his position as the Archbishop on reaching 75 years of age but continued to live in the Archbishop's House at Secunderabad and was Archbishop Emeritus.

On his retirement, the Archdiocese of Hyderabad released a book Love and Serve, a brief memoir authored by Archbishop Arulappa himself.

== Appraisal ==
- Dr. J. A. Oliver of the Andhra Pradesh and Telangana Council of Churches:
  ...Fr. Arulappa was known for his uprightness and never minced words in distinguishing religion from culture.
- Sri L. K. Advani, Deputy Prime Minister of India:

...admired for his patriotism and bold espousal of cultural nationalism.

- Dr. Y. S. Rajasekhara Reddy, Chief Minister of Andhra Pradesh:

...He was a man of the masses and people not only of the Catholic community but those from all religions loved and respected him immensely.

- Sri K. R. Suresh Reddy, Speaker of the Legislature of Andhra Pradesh:

...a man of great image who dwelt on the hearts of multitude of people on the dint of his unforgettable social service.

- Martin Michael and James Sylvester of the Catholic Association of Hyderabad

...During his three-decade-long tenure, he had seen the growth of the Archdiocese of Hyderabad from a mere 10 parishes to 72 in the districts of Hyderabad, Ranga Reddy, Medak and Nizamabad.

== Writings ==
- Want to be a Hero - Anecdotes with a message, 1999, Amruthavani Publications, Secunderabad.
- The Ethics of Religious Conversions, (with Dr. David Frawley), Pragna Bharathi, Hyderabad.
- Quoted in B. K. Kiran's Education in Human Values for the Twenty-first Century, a NCERT publication
  ...Perhaps the most fundamental and insidious challenge, is “lack of political will”. Archbishop of Hyderabad, the Rev. Samineni Arulappa (1999) perceives a reason behind this frequently lamented phenomenon: “Apparently there seems to be no political will to solve the problems of education. Many political leaders often seems to be not really interested to change the system. They are happy to keep the masses ignorant and illiterate. There are people who say that the Indian politicians and bureaucrats have never sincerely tried to educate the masses. Once education becomes compulsory and universal, people will be conscious of their rights and will not allow themselves to be exploited. They can elect their leaders on the basis of character, intellectual and moral excellence rather than region and religion.” Where will political will come from? Or, perhaps more pressingly, can anything be done about the increasing void of “character, intellectual and moral excellence” among the populace in the meantime?

== Ordination of women ==
The eminent Catholic scholar and theologian Father John Wijngaards, MHM, L.S.S. (Rome), D. Th. (Rome) served as a lecturer in St. John's Regional Seminary, Hyderabad from 1964-1976 during the archbishopric of Arulappa. He espoused the cause of women priests.

Although Archbishop Arulappa expressed his respect for women, he remained faithful to the stance taken by Rome regarding women's ordination. Speaking at the plenary of the Association of Theologically Trained Women of India (ATTWI), held at the Auditorium of Stanley Girls High School, Chapel Road, Hyderabad, in 1999, he said that women in the Catholic Church were given duties like Bible reading, offering communion, etc., and were also holding independent positions in religious orders and managing institutions.

Once, while addressing the Catholic Family Movement, he jocularly remarked that "God created man and rested. He created woman and neither God or man rested. That is the problem of all married people." On another occasion, he remarked that "Women are only asking for equality. I am one of those who say that women are actually superior to men!"

== Death ==
Archbishop Arulappa died in Hyderabad at the age of 80. In accordance with his wishes stated in a will, he was buried in the altar in St. Mary's Church, Secunderabad, on 14 February 2005.

Religious titles
Preceded by G. Joseph Mark	Archbishop of Hyderabad; 6.12.1971–29.1.2000	Succeeded by M. Joji
