= Directorate of Forensic Science Services =

Forensics institute of the Government of India

The Directorate of Forensic Science Services is a government body under the Ministry of Home Affairs, Government of India, responsible for providing advanced forensic science services to law enforcement agencies and the criminal justice system across the country. Established to strengthen forensic infrastructure and promote scientific investigation, the DFSS oversees a network of Central Forensic Science Laboratories (CFSLs) located across major cities.

It supports the application of modern forensic techniques in crime detection, evidence analysis, and judicial processes.

== Locations ==
There are seven central forensic laboratories in India, at Hyderabad, Kolkata, Chandigarh, New Delhi, Guwahati, Bhopal and Pune. An eighth central forensic laboratory is currently under construction in India, at Amaravati.

CFSL Hyderabad is a centre of excellence in chemical sciences, CFSL Kolkata (the oldest laboratory in India) in biological sciences, and CFSL Chandigarh in physical sciences. The CFSL New Delhi comes under the Central Bureau of Investigation, Delhi, whereas the other laboratories are under the control of the Directorate of Forensic Science Services (DFSS) of the Ministry of Home Affairs. The laboratory in New Delhi is under the control of the Central Bureau of Investigation (CBI) which investigates cases on its behalf. Dr. Asha Srivastava is currently the Director of CFSL (CBI) New Delhi. Mr. Mithilesh Jha an alumnus of the Delhi Campus of National Forensic Sciences University (Formerly LNJN-NICFS) is working as a Senior Scientific Officer and HOD of the Serology division of CFSL (CBI), Delhi. Mr. Brijendra Badonia is the Director of CFSL Kolkata, Sh Mahesh Chandra Joshi is the Director of CFSL Hyderabad and Dr. S.K. Jain is in charge of CFSL Chandigarh.

== See also ==
- National Forensic Sciences University
- Lok Nayak Jayaprakash Narayan National Institute of Criminology & Forensic Science
