= Central Forensic Science Laboratory, Hyderabad =

Indian research laboratory

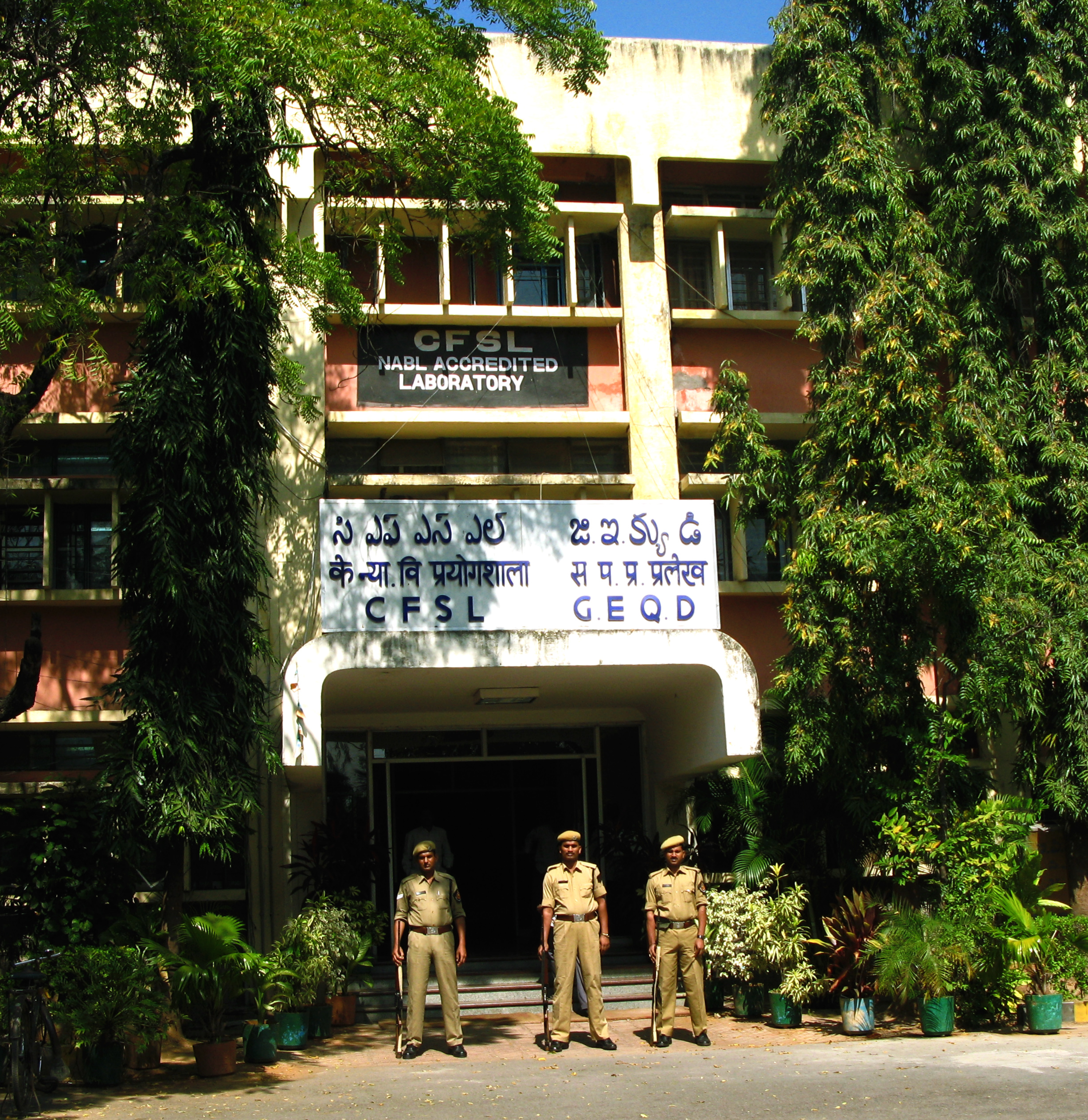
The Central Forensic Science Laboratory in Hyderabad, Telangana

The Central Forensic Science Laboratory, Hyderabad (CFSL, Hyderabad), established in 1967 is one of the Seven Central Forensic Science Laboratories in India. The other laboratories are at Chandigarh, Kolkata, Bhopal, Pune and Guwahati. Since 2002, the laboratory is under the administrative control of the Directorate of Forensic Science Services, Ministry of Home Affairs (India), Government of India.

== History ==
The laboratory, in the beginning started functioning from the Chirag Ali Lane in the Abids area of Hyderabad city. The laboratory shifted to its present location in Ramanthapur in 1982. The laboratory is situated in the vicinity of the Osmania University institutional area. Among other scientific examination facilities the laboratory provides the facilities for Explosives, Ballistics, Narcotics, Physics, Toxicology, Biology, Chemistry, Documents DNA examination and cyber forensics. Fingerprint verification is not done, however signature verification will be done.

INTERNSHIPS are NOT PROVIDED at CFSL, Hyderabad

There are no academics, its a laboratory ... It is not a COLLEGE/ACADEMIC Institution
