= Thatipatri Gnanamma =

Indian missionary (1819 - 1874)

Servant Of God Thatipatri Gnanamma தாடிபத்திரி ஞானம்மா తతిపత్రి జ్ఞానమ్మ
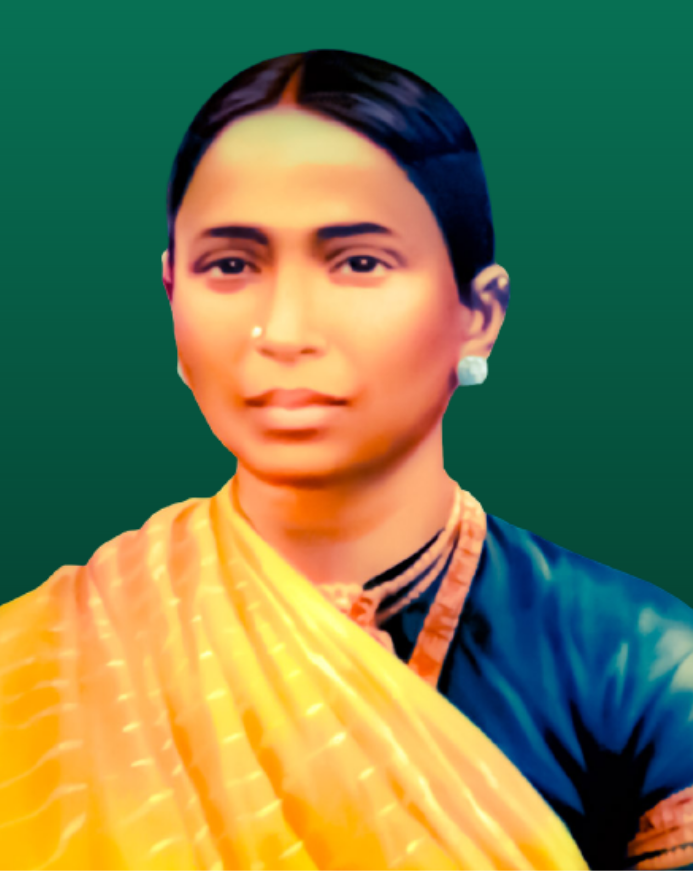
- Born: 1819; Phirangipuram, Guntur, Andhra Pradesh, India
- Died: December 21, 1874; Kilacheri, India

Thatipatri Gnanamma (1819–1874) was a Roman Catholic lay woman who founded the congregation of Sisters of St. Anne of Madras and Sisters of St. Anne Phirangipuram. She was declared Servant of God by the Holy See on 21 January 2014.

== Early life ==
Gnanamma was born in 1819 in Phirangipuram, Guntur, Andhra Pradesh, India to a Telugu Kamma family. She was the second child of Gali Rayana and Mariamma. In 1837, she married Innaiah, who died when she was 39. She had five sons; they joined a seminary.

== Founding of Orders ==
Gnanamma started a school for girls in Phirangipuram in 1862. Two young women, Arulamma and Agathamma, joined her in her social work in 1871. Gnanamma talked with the parish priest about forming a congregation of nuns and sent young women to train under the Sisters of the Congregation of the Good Shepherd, Bellary. She started two congregations, one at Madras and another at Phirangipuram. Her congregations came into existence after her death.

== Death ==
Gnanamma died at Kilacheri on 21 December 1874 after suffering from chronic asthma. She was buried in the parish cemetery.

== Beatification ==
She was declared a Servant of God by the Holy See on 21 January 2014.

== See also ==
List of saints of India
