= Alphonso Beretta =

Italian bishop (1911-1998)

Bishop Alphonsus Beretta, PIME Ayyagaru
- The Most Reverend
- Monseigneur Beretta
- Church: Pontifical Institute for Foreign Missions
- Diocese: Hyderabad (1950-1953); Warangal (1953-1985)
- Appointed: December 23, 1950 (in Hyderabad); January 8, 1953 (in Warangal)
- In office: 1950-1953 (in Hyderabad); 1953-1985 (in Warangal)
- Predecessor: Dionisio Vismara, PIME (in Hyderabad); Position created (in Warangal)
- Successor: G. Joseph Mark, RCM (in Hyderabad); T. Bala, RCM (in Warangal)

Orders
- Ordination: September 22, 1934 by Pontifical Institute for Foreign Missions
- Consecration: April 8, 1951 by Principal Consecrator: A. I. Shuster, OSB; Principal Co-Consecrators: L. M. Balconi, PIME and D. Bernareggi, RCM
- Rank: Bishop

Personal details
- Born: December 26, 1911 Brugherio (Italy)
- Died: May 23, 1998 (aged 86) Karunapuram, Andhra Pradesh (1956–2014)
- Buried: RCM-Fatima Cathedral, Warangal, Andhra Pradesh (1956–2014)
- Denomination: Christianity
- Occupation: Priest
- Education: B. Th.
- Alma mater: PIME Seminary, Monza (Italy)

Alfonso Beretta P.I.M.E. (26 December 1911 – 23 May 1998, Alfonso Beretta) was an Italian Bishop of Warangal.

== Life ==
Beretta was born in Brugherio in 1911 on Boxing Day. He was ordained as a priest on 22 September 1934 as a priest of the Pontifical Institute for Foreign Missions. He was appointed Bishop of the Roman Catholic Diocese of Hyderabad, India on 23 Dec 1950 and consecrated on 8 April 1951. He was appointed to be the Bishop of Warangal in India on 8 Jan 1953.

Beretta retired on 30 November 1985 and he died in Warangal in 1998 as the Bishop Emeritus of Warangal.
