= J. M. Vyas =

Indian academic administrator and forensic scientist

Jayantkumar Maganlal Vyas is an Indian academic and forensic scientist who serves as a Vice Chancellor of National Forensic Sciences University, Gandhinagar. He served as the Director for the Directorate of Forensic Science, Gujarat State for three decades.

== Biography ==
Vyas has studied Master of Science, PhD and LLB.

Vyas served as the Director for the Directorate of Forensic Science, Gujarat State from 1993 to until his retirement in 2009. He held the additional charge of the office until 2020. He was the Director General of the Gujarat Forensic Sciences University from February 2009 to 2020. The university was renamed the National Forensic Sciences University in 2020 and he continued as the Vice Chancellor.

== Recognition ==
Vyas was awarded the President's Medal for his services in 1997. In 2004, he was awarded the Commendation Certificate as the Best Forensic Science Laboratory Director at the 15th All India Forensic Science Conference. He was awarded the Lifetime Achievement Award in Forensic Chemistry by Amity University and AIIMS, New Delhi in 2008.

He was awarded the Padma Shri by the Government of India in 2022 for his contribution in field of forensic science and engineering.
