= D. M. Prakasam =

His Excellency D. M. Prakasam
- Bishop of Nellore
- Church: Christian
- See: Roman Catholic Church
- In office: 7 December 2006 —Incumbent
- Predecessor: P. C. Balaswamy
- Successor: Incumbent
- Previous post: Bishop of Cuddapah

Orders
- Ordination: 7 April 1983
- Consecration: 28 August 2002

Personal details
- Born: 2 October 1957 (age 68) Mariampuram, Andhra Pradesh

Doraboina Moses Prakasam (born 2 October 1957) is the fourth Bishop of the Roman Catholic Diocese of Nellore, in the state of Andhra Pradesh in India.

St. Joseph's Cathedral in Nellore is the seat of the Bishop of Nellore.

The Bishop is well versed in Latin as well as Telugu and English.

== Early years ==
After completing theological studies at St. John's Regional Seminary in Hyderabad, Prakasam was ordained a priest of the Diocese of Cuddapah on 7 April 1983.

He also pursued doctoral studies at the Gregorian University, Rome. The doctoral thesis submitted in 2001 was entitled John Rawl's Theory of Justice and a Catholic Conception of Justice: A Comparative Study.

== Bishopric ==
=== Diocese of Cuddapah ===
On 26 July 2002, Pope John Paul II appointed Prakasam as the Bishop of Cuddapah. On 7 December 2006, Pope Benedict XVI transferred him to the Diocese of Nellore.

=== Diocese of Nellore ===
The diocese of Nellore comprises the civil districts of Prakasam and Nellore where majority of the Christian population is Dalit whereas the clergy are non-Dalits. Caste divisions even among Christians are not uncommon. Christians here have long been waiting for a Bishop who could be identified with them. Hence, the appointment of Bishop Prakasam fulfilled the aspirations of the people here.

==== Appointment ====
Pope Benedict XVI appointed Prakasam as the Bishop of Nellore on 7 December 2006 following the resignation of Bishop P. C. Balaswamy.

On 17 January 2007, Bishop Prakasam was principally consecrated by Archbishop M. Joji and co-consecrators Bishop P. C. Balaswamy and Bishop G. Bali.

Religious titles
Preceded by P. C. Balaswamy	Bishop of Nellore; 7 December 2006 – present	Succeeded by Incumbent
Preceded by M. Prakash	Bishop of Cuddapah; 26 July 2002 – 7 December 2006	Succeeded by G. Prasad
