= Poluru =

Coordinates: 16°00′N 80°13′E

- Village
- Interactive map of Poluru
- Location in Andhra Pradesh, India
- Country: India
- State: Andhra Pradesh
- District: Bapatla
- Mandal: Yeddanapudi
- Talukas: Yadhanapudi

Languages
  - Official: Telugu
- Time zone: UTC+5:30 (IST)

Poluru is a village in Yeddanapudi mandal, Bapatla district of Andhra Pradesh in India.
