= National Forensic Sciences University =

University in India

- Other name: NFSU
- Motto: anveshanadvara shiksha
- Motto in English: Education through Investigation
- Type: INI; Public International Research university
- Established: 11 February 2009; 17 years ago as Gujarat Forensic Sciences University; 1 October 2020; 6 years ago as National Forensic Sciences University (NFSU)
- Parent institution: Ministry Of Home Affairs, Government of India
- Accreditation: Ministry of External Affairs, Government of India
- Affiliations: BRICS Universities League; CFSL
- Academic affiliations: Institutes of National Importance (Autonomous Body)
- Budget: ₹2,254.43 crore (US$234.1 million) (2024–25)
- Vice-Chancellor: Dr. J. M. Vyas
- Location: NFSU Campus, Sector-9, Gandhinagar, Gujarat, 382007, India; 23.210472°N 72.662011°E
- Campus: Urban
- Website: www.nfsu.ac.in

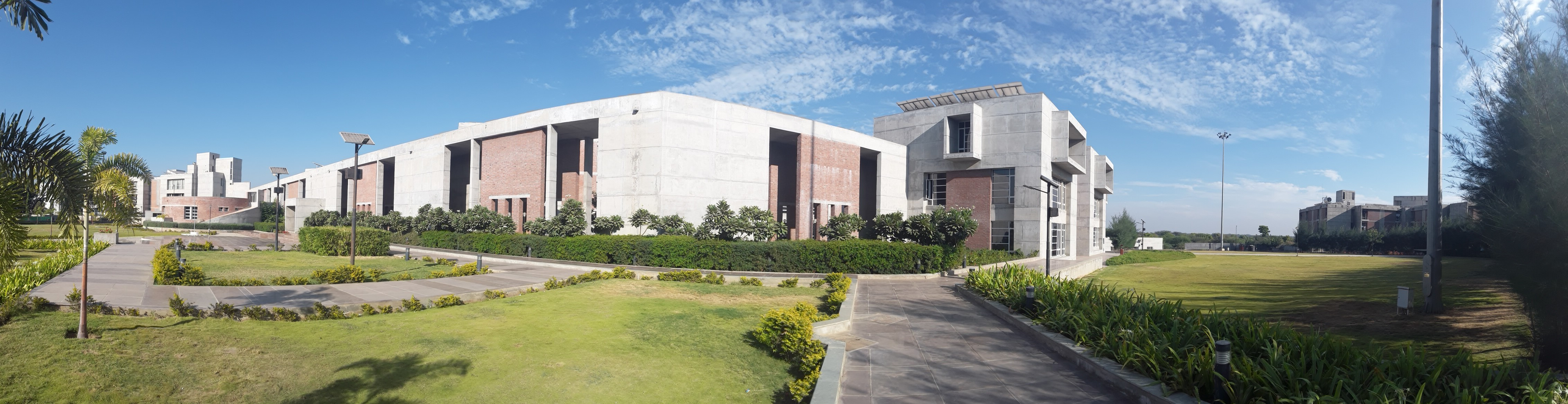
Panoramic view

National Forensic Sciences University (abb. as NFSU; formerly Gujarat Forensic Science University) is a public international university and an autonomous institute located in Gandhinagar, Gujarat, India. It is recognized as an Institution of National Importance under the Ministry of Home Affairs (MHA), Government of India, by an act of the Indian Parliament. NFSU is solely dedicated to forensic science, investigative science and criminology.

== History ==
The Gujarat Forensic Science University was formed by the Government of Gujarat in 2008. It was created by Act 17 passed in the Gujarat Legislative Assembly on 30 September 2008. It was upgraded to the National Forensic Sciences University in October 2020. It is recognised as an Institution of National Importance by the Act of Parliament. It became an international university in April 2023, after the first campus of the university outside India at Uganda, which also became Africa's first Forensics Science University, was inaugurated and opened by the Minister of External Affairs, S. Jaishankar.

== Campuses ==
As of April 2023, it has 9 campuses across India and 1 campus in Uganda.

=== India ===
| No. | Name | Established | City | State/UT |
|---|---|---|---|---|
| 1 | NFSU Main Campus | 2008 | Gandhinagar | Gujarat |
| 2 | LNJN-NICFS | 1972 | Delhi | Delhi |
| 3 | NFSU Goa Campus | 2021 | Ponda | Goa |
| 4 | NFSU Tripura Campus | 2021 | Agartala | Tripura |
| 5 | NFSU Bhopal Campus | | Bhopal | Madhya Pradesh |
| 6 | NFSU Pune Campus | | Pune | Maharashtra |
| 7 | NFSU Guwahati Campus | | Guwahati | Assam |
| 8 | NFSU Manipur Campus | 2022 | Imphal | Manipur |
| 9 | NFSU Dharwad Campus | 2023 | Dharwad | Karnataka |
| 10 | NFSU Bhubaneswar Campus | 2023 | Bhubaneswar | Odisha |
| 11 | NFSU Patna Campus | 2026 | Patna | Bihar |

=== Uganda ===
| No. | Name | Established | City | Region |
|---|---|---|---|---|
| 1 | NFSU Uganda | 2023 | Jinja | Eastern Region |

=== Kazakhstan ===
| No. | Name | Established | City | Region |
|---|---|---|---|---|
| 1 | NFSU Kazakhstan | 2025 | Astana | capital city of Kazakhstan |

== See also ==
- Central Forensic Science Laboratory
- National Institute of Criminology & Forensic Science
- Institute of Forensic Science, Mumbai
