= Cuddalore Central Prison =

Prison in Cuddalore, India

- Location in Tamil Nadu Cuddalore Central Prison (India)
- Location: Cuddalore, Tamil Nadu, India; 11.755802°N 79.766541°E
- Security class: Central Prison
- Capacity: 723
- Managed by: Tamil Nadu Prison Department

Notable prisoners
- Subramanya Bharathi

Cuddalore Central Prison is located in Cuddalore, India. The prison was built during 1865 and initially used for housing mentally challenged people. It was converted into a prison for habitual offenders in 1986. The poet Subramanya Bharathi was confined in this prison during the freedom struggle from 20 September 1918 to 14 December 1918. The prison is authorised to accommodate 723 prisoners.
