= Marampudi Joji =

His Excellency Marampudi Joji
- Archbishop Emeritus of Hyderabad
- Church: Christian
- See: Roman Catholic Church
- In office: 30 April 2000 – 27 August 2010
- Predecessor: S. Arulappa
- Successor: Thumma Bala
- Previous post: Bishop of Vijayawada

Orders
- Ordination: 14 December 1971
- Consecration: 30 April 2000

Personal details
- Born: 7 October 1942 Bhimavaram, Andhra Pradesh
- Died: 27 August 2010 (aged 67) Bishop's House, Hyderabad

Marampudi Joji (7 October 1942 – 27 August 2010) was the third Archbishop of Hyderabad. He was born in Bhimavaram and died at the Bishop's House, Hyderabad, Andhra Pradesh. He knew Latin, Telugu, and English.

== Early years & education ==
Joji was educated at the Lutheran Boarding School in Peddapuram near Samalkot which is managed by the Priests of the Andhra Evangelical Lutheran Church (AELC).

== Ordination & Pastorship ==
Joji was ordained a priest on 14 December 1971 in the diocese of Vijayawada. Joji was privileged to have received Blessed Mother Teresa when she went to Vijayawada to initiate the work of the Missionaries of Charity.

== Bishopric ==
=== Diocese of Khammam ===
On 21 December 1991, he was appointed the Bishop of Khammam and consecrated on 19 March 1992. He served until 8 November 1996 when he was transferred to the Diocese of Vijayawada.

=== Diocese of Vijayawada ===
Bishop Joji became the Bishop of Vijayawada on 8 November 1996. However, he took charge of the diocese only on 19 January 1997.

== Archbishop of Hyderabad ==
On 29 January 2000, he was appointed the Archbishop of Hyderabad. He was installed by Archbishop Giorgio Zur in the presence of his predecessor Archbishop S. Arulappa and of Bishop Joseph S. Thumma on 30 April 2000.

Joji inaugurated the Hyderabad session of the scholarly Church History Association of India incorporating Church Historians of the Pentecostal, Protestant, Orthodox, and Catholic traditions.

Archbishop Joji was known for his able administration. He seemed to have headed the Diocese of Vijayawada's Social Service Society before being elevated to the Bishopric of Khammam.

The Archbishop has principally consecrated three Bishops of Andhra Pradesh:

- Bishop of Kurnool, Most Rev. P. Anthony (19 April 2008)
- Bishop of Cuddapah, Most Rev. G. Prasad (1 March 2008)
- Bishop of Nellore, Most Rev. D. M. Prakasam (17 January 2007)

== See also ==
- Telugu Christian
- B. P. Sugandhar, Bishop-in-Medak, Church of South India

Catholic Church titles
Preceded by Samineni Arulappa	Archbishop of Hyderabad; 29 January 2000 – 27 August 2010	Succeeded by Thumma Bala
Preceded by Joseph S. Thumma	Bishop of Vijayawada; 1996–2000	Succeeded by Prakash Mallavarapu
Preceded by Joseph Rajappa	Bishop of Khammam; 1991–1996	Succeeded by Paul Maipan
