= St. John's Regional Seminary =

Catholic seminary in Hyderabad, Telangana, India

- Latin: Regio Seminarium Sanctus Iohannes
- Type: Major Seminary
- Established: 1965
- Affiliations: Roman Curia
- President: Bishop Most Rev. Ch. Bhagyaiah, (Chairperson)
- Rector: Rev. Fr. Kommareddy Marreddy
- Location: Ramanthapur, Hyderabad 500 013, Telangana, India; 17°23′35″N 78°32′39″E
- Campus: Urban
- Website: stjohnseminaryhyd.org

St. John's Regional Seminary is the theologate of the Catholic Church of Andhra Pradesh and Telangana. It is a major seminary training students to become priests.

St. John's Regional Seminary is situated in Ramanthapur in Hyderabad.

== Affiliation ==
The seminary is listed as a Major Seminary under the Roman Curia.

== Background ==
St. John's Regional Seminary was founded in 1965 in Ramanthapur, Hyderabad, to train priests for the Catholic Church in Andhra Pradesh. In 1987, the seminary was divided into two. The theologiate was retained in Hyderabad while the philosophate (St. John's Regional Seminary (Philosophate)) was moved to Kothavalasa in the northern circars of Andhra Pradesh.

== Board of Governors ==
The ten bishops and two archbishops in the state of Andhra Pradesh are ex officio members of the Board of Governors of St. John's Regional Seminary:

- Archdiocese of Hyderabad – Archbishop Poola Anthony
- Archdiocese of Visakhapatnam – Archbishop Mallavarapu Prakash
- Diocese of Srikakulam – Bishop Rayarala Vijaya Kumar
- Diocese of Eluru – Bishop Polimera Jaya Rao
- Diocese of Vijayawada – Bishop Telagathoti Joseph Raja Rao
- Diocese of Guntur – Bishop Chinnabathini Bhagyaiah
- Diocese of Nellore – Bishop D. M. Prakasam
- Diocese of Kadapa – Apostolic Administrator – Bishop Gali Bali
- Diocese of Kurnool – Administrator – Anthonappa Chowrappa
- Diocese of Nalgonda – Bishop Govindu Joji
- Diocese of Warangal – Bishop Udumala Bala
- Diocese of Khammam – Bishop M. Paul

== Admissions ==
The seminary follows a semester system. Admission is for Catholic pupils who are eligible to pursue priestly studies and from any of the ten Catholic dioceses and two archdioceses in Andhra Pradesh.

== See also ==
Other University-affiliated seminaries in Telangana region

- Andhra Christian Theological College, Hyderabad
- Mennonite Brethren Centenary Bible College, Shamshabad
