= Father (honorific) =

Title and honorific across languages

Father has been used as both title and honorific in various languages, synonyms and historical contexts. It may sometimes denote a title of authority or of honour.

== List of uses of "father" in various languages ==
=== By culture and/or language ===
- Ab (Semitic)
  - Bwana ("our father"), from Swahili, meaning an important person or safari leader
  - Abu in Kunya (Arabic), used as epithet for "father of X"
- Baba, mark of respect in:
  - Indian honorific Hindu and Sikh
  - Baba (honorific) in Persian language
  - In Malaysia as an honorific of respect to address Chinese people born in the British Straits Settlements
- Batko, a Ukrainian honorific meaning "father"
- List of people considered father or mother of a field
- Founding father
  - Father of the Nation/Father of the Country
    - Pater Patriae
    - Fathers of Confederation
    - Founding fathers of the European Union
    - Founding Fathers of the United States
- Pater familias (Latin), title for head of household in Ancient Rome

=== Personifications ===
- Father Time
- Father Christmas
- Ded Moroz ("Father Frost")

=== By religion ===
- God the Father

==== Buddhism ====
- Abbot (Buddhism) a title for a monk who holds the position of administrator of a Buddhist monastery or Buddhist temple

==== Christianity ====
- Patriarch (Greek, literally "father ruler") as a title for the primate of a Christian church
  - Pope
- Church Fathers
- Abbot, an ecclesiastical title given to the male head of a monastery
- Father, as a honorific for a priest
  - Aboona ("our father") in Syriac language
  - Abuna ("our father") in Amharic and Tigrinya

== See also ==
- List of people considered father or mother of a field
