= Diocese of Kurnool =

Roman Catholic diocese in Andhra Pradesh, India

Coordinates: 15.8083°N 78.0417°E

Diocese of Kurnool Dioecesis Kurnoolensis कुरनूल के सूबा

Location
- Country: India
- Territory: Andhra Pradesh districts of Kurnool and Anantapur
- Metropolitan: Hyderabad

Statistics
- Area: 43,000 km^{2} (17,000 sq mi)
- Population: (as of 2010); 82,484
- Parishes: 52

Information
- Rite: Latin Rite
- Cathedral: Our Lady of Lourdes Cathedral
- Co-cathedral: St. Teresa’s Co-Cathedral

Current leadership
- Pope: Leo XIV
- Bishop: Johannes Gorantla, O.C.D.
- Metropolitan Archbishop: Anthony Poola
- Vicar General: Msgr. David Arulappa

Website
- Website of the Diocese

The Roman Catholic Diocese of Kurnool (Latin: Dioecesis Kurnoolensis) is a diocese located in the city of Kurnool in the ecclesiastical province of Hyderabad in India.

== History ==
Jesuit missionaries evangelized this region until 1773, when missionaries from the Paris Foreign Missions Society took over the mission.

The current Diocese of Kurnool was erected from the Diocese of Nellore on 12 June 1967.

== Ordinary ==
=== Bishop ===
1. Joseph Rajappa (12 June 1967 – 18 January 1988)
2. Mathew Cheriankunnel, P.I.M.E. (18 January 1988 – 16 July 1991)
3. Johannes Gorantla (6 December 1993 – 20 January 2007)
4. Cardinal Anthony Poola (8 February 2008 – 19 November 2020); elevated Archbishop of Hyderabad
5. Johannes Gorantla, O.C.D. (27 February 2024 – )

=== Apostolic administrator ===
1. Bishop Abraham Aruliah Somavarapa (1991 – 6 December 1993)
2. Monsignor Anthonappa Chowrappa (20 November 2020 – 2024)
