= Fatimanagar =

Fatima Nagar
- Neighbourhood
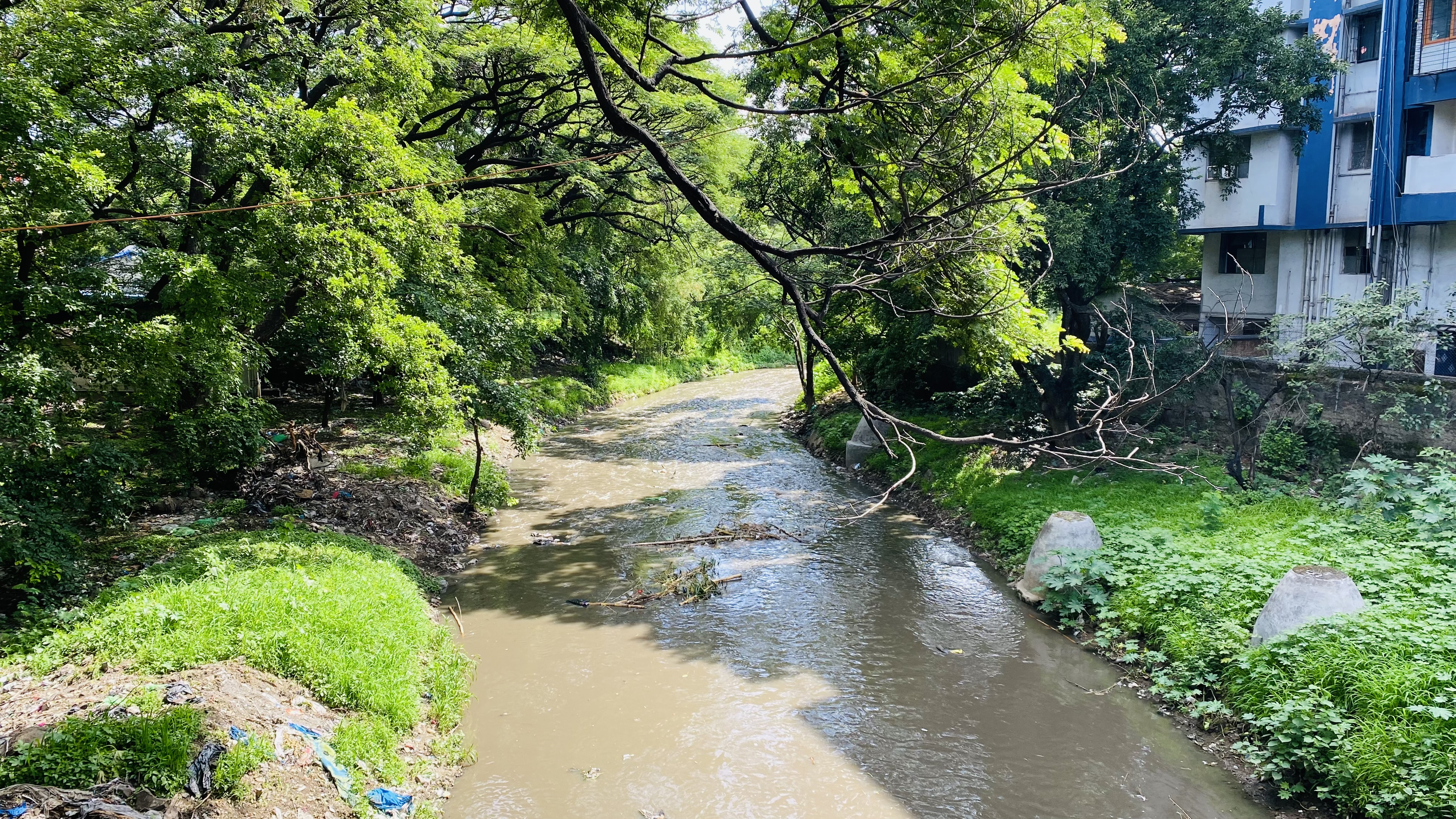

- Location within Maharashtra
- Coordinates: 18.505006°N 73.900849°E
- Country: India
- State: Maharashtra
- District: Pune
- Taluka: Haveli
- Named for: Congregation of Sisters of Our Lady of Fatima

Population
  - Total: approx. 6,500
- Time zone: UTC+5:30 (IST)
- Postcode: 411040
- Telephone code: 020

Fatima Nagar is a neighbourhood in Pune. The neighbourhood derives its name from the "Congregation of Sisters of Our Lady of Fatima" located here. It is a part of Wanowrie.

It is bordered by Bhairoba Nala and Pune Cantonment to the west, Pune-Solapur highway to the north, a Christian graveyard and the State Reserve Police Force (S.R.P.F.) to the east and Shivarkar Garden to the south.

== Congregation of Sisters of Our Lady of Fatima ==
The congregation was founded by Msgr. Francis Xavier Kroot, MHM, on 8 February 1893 as "Missionary Sisters of St. Francis Xavier" at Bellary in Karnataka, then under the archdiocese of Madras, by Msgr Francis Xavier Kroot, MHM. Born on 7 December 1854, in Holland, Francis Kroot joined the Mill Hill Missionary Society of St Joseph, was ordained a priest on 8 June 1878 and reached India on 8 August 1878. He served in the capacity of a military chaplain in Poonamallee, Madras and Bellary. On 8 September 1895, three Sisters pronounced their first vows and were moved to the first convent, St Francis Xavier's convent, near St Lazaurs church, Cowl Bazaar. Later a novitiate was also established to accommodate the increasing number of candidates.

In 1951 Mother Stanislaus, the then Mother General sought permission from Bishop John Hogan of Bellary and Bishop Andrew D'souza of Poona to shift the Generalate and Novitiate to Poona. Accordingly new rules were framed and as per the directives of Bishop Andrew the Congregation was re-Christened to "Sisters of Our Lady of Fatima" and Pune became its headquarters. Thus 16 July 1951 marked the shift of the Generalate and Novitiate from Bellary to Pune.
