= Kothavalasa =

- Suburb
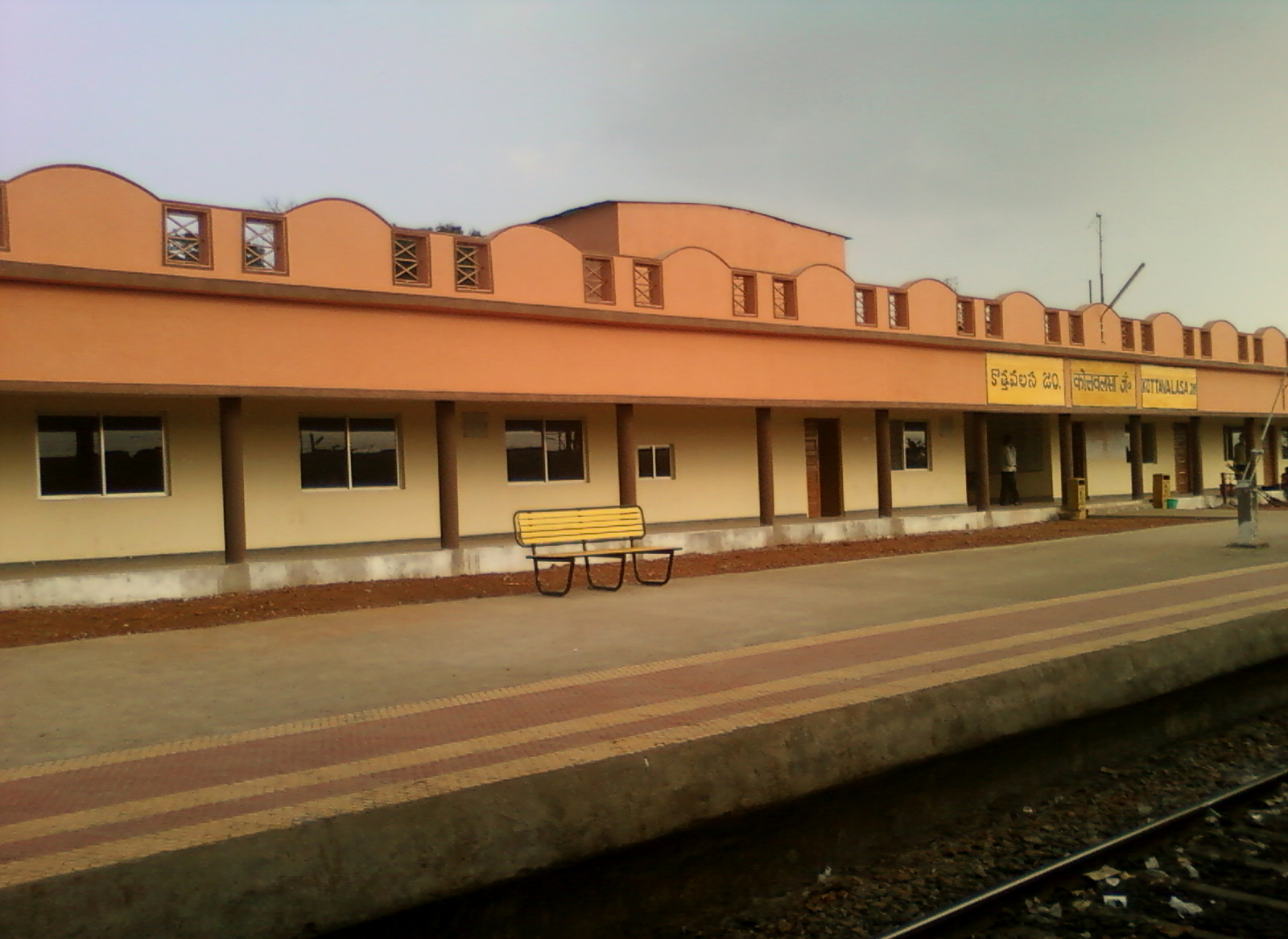
- Kothavalasa Train Station

- Location in Andhra Pradesh, India
- Coordinates: 17.9°N 83.2°E
- Country: India
- State: Andhra Pradesh
- District: Vizianagaram

Area
  - Total: 7.60 km^{2} (2.93 sq mi)
- Elevation: 209 m (686 ft)

Population (2011)
  - Total: 14,321
  - Density: 1,880/km^{2} (4,880/sq mi)

Languages
  - Official: Telugu
- Time zone: UTC+5:30 (IST)
- PIN: 535183
- Vehicle Registration: AP35 (Former); AP39 (from 30 January 2019)

Kothavalasa is a town in Vizianagaram district of the Indian state of Andhra Pradesh. It is located in Kothavalasa mandal of Vizianagaram revenue division. It is located 30 km from the city of Visakhapatanam

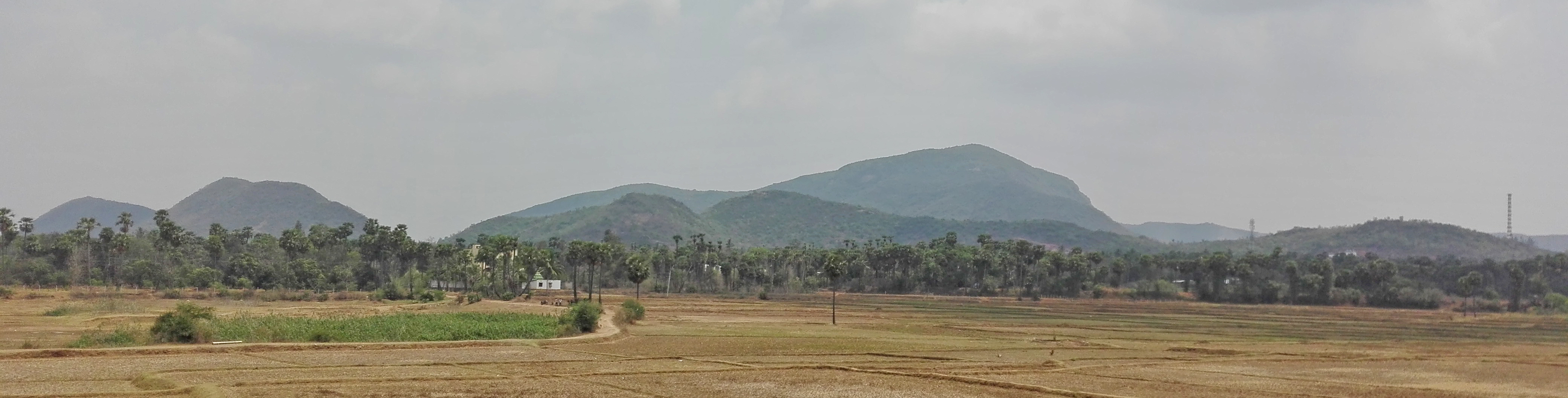
Panoramic view of Eastern Ghats near Kothavalasa

== Geography ==
Kothavalasa is located at 17.9°N 83.2°E. It has an average elevation of 209 meters (688 feet).

== Transport ==
Kothavalasa has a railway station which is under jurisdiction of Erstwhile East Coast Railway and present South Coast Railway. Kothavalasa is well-connected to Visakhapatnam with the APSRTC Bus Station where Vizag city bus routes terminate. Busses to Viziangaram, S. Kota, Araku, Devarapalli, and Anakapalli pass through Kothavalasa.

== Demographics ==
As of 2011 India census, Kothavalasa had a population of 17,433. Males constitute 50% of the population and females 50%. Kothavalasa has an average literacy rate of 69%, higher than the national average of 59.5%: male literacy is 76%, and female literacy is 62%. In Kothavalasa, 12% of the population is under 6 years of age.

Kothavalasa mandal had a population of 62,841 in 2001. Males consists of 31,428 and females 31,413 (M:E ratio=1:1) of the population. The average literacy rate of the mandal population is 60%. Male literacy rate is 72% and that of females 48%.

== Education ==
The primary and secondary school education is imparted by government, aided and private schools, under the School Education Department of the state. The medium of instruction followed by different schools are English, Telugu. St. John's Regional Seminary (Philosophate) is situated near Kondadaba.

== See also ==
- Kothavalasa railway station
