= Institute of Forensic Science, Mumbai =

College in Mumbai, India

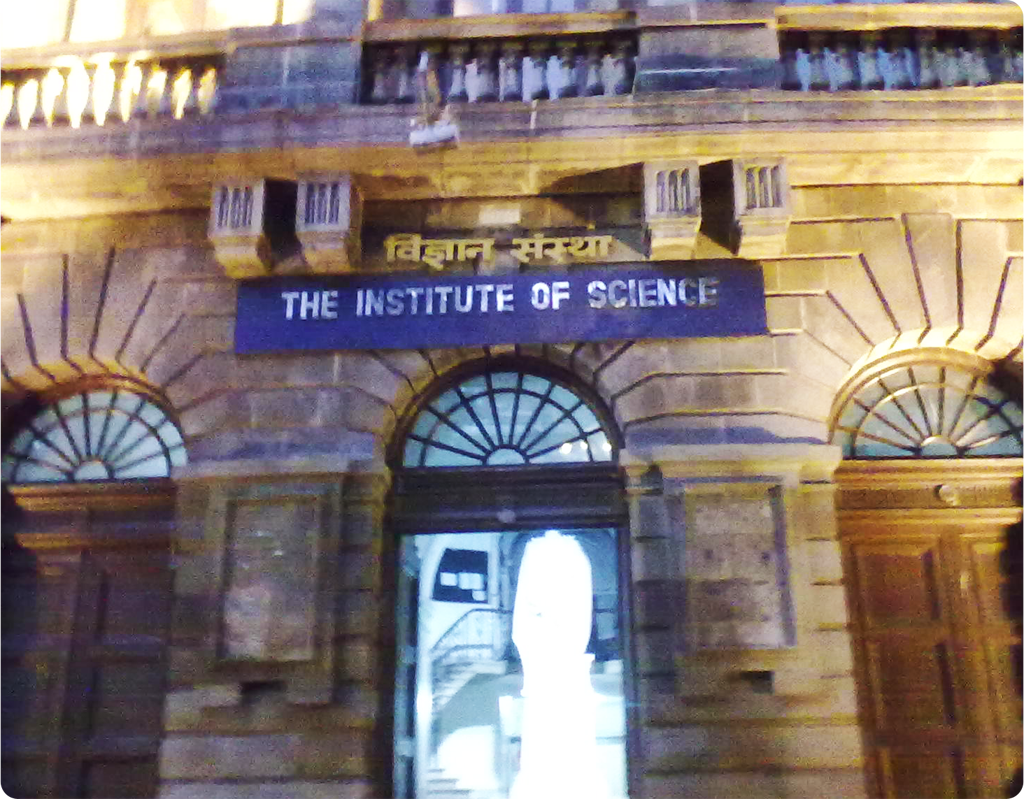
Institute of Forensic Science

The Institute of Forensic Science, Mumbai (IFSC Mumbai) is an institute of higher education in Mumbai, India.

The Institute of Forensic Science was established in 2009 by the Department of Higher and Technical Education of the State Government of Maharashtra. The institute offers courses leading to a BSc degree in forensic science and a Master of Forensic Science (two years) with specialisations in Forensic Serology and DNA Analysis, Toxicology, Ballistics, and Digital and Cyber Forensics. It also offers postgraduate diploma in forensic science and related law, and a postgraduate diploma in digital and cyber forensic and related law. The Institute of Forensic Science is affiliated with Mumbai University.

IFSC Mumbai is housed on the grounds of the Institute of Science, an institute for postgraduate teaching and research.
