= Ramanthapur =

- Neighbourhood
- Location in Telangana, India Ramanthapur (Telangana) Ramanthapur (India)
- Coordinates: 17.3919297°N 78.5383792°E
- Country: India
- State: Telangana
- District: Medchal–Malkajgiri
- Mandal: Hyderabad
- Zone: East
- Circle: Uppal Kalan
- Ward: 7

Government
  - Type: Municipal
  - Body: Bandaru Srivani Venkatrao (BJP)
- Elevation: 494 m (1,621 ft)

Population (2011)
  - Total: 40,373

Languages
  - Official: Telugu
- Time zone: UTC+5:30 (IST)
- PIN: 500 013
- 2703: +91–40
- Vehicle registration: TG

Ramanthapur lies in the eastern part of the city of Hyderabad, located in the Indian state of Telangana. It lies between Uppal and Amberpet, on the road from Uppal to Kachiguda. The area has been drastically developed when compared to the early 1920s . The population has also sighted a raise with increase in construction of new residential buildings. It forms Ward No. 9 of Greater Hyderabad Municipal Corporation.

== Institutions ==
Institutions in the area include CFSL Hyderabad, Central Detective Training School, Government Homoeopathy college and Government Polytechnic college. Aurora pg college main campus. A DD Yadagiri TV studio is also located in Ramanthapur.

== Transport ==
Ramanthapur is located on the Warangal Highway. The Metro Rail approaches the Uppal ring road and the Rajiv Gandhi International Cricket Stadium, and a new station is being built near Nagole. Ramanthapur has three TGSRTC (Telangana State Road Transport Corporation) bus stops.
