= Archdiocese of Hyderabad =

Roman Catholic archdiocese in Telangana, India

Coordinates: 17.3956°N 78.4774°E

Metropolitan Archdiocese of Hyderabad Archidioecesis Metropolitae Hyderabadensis
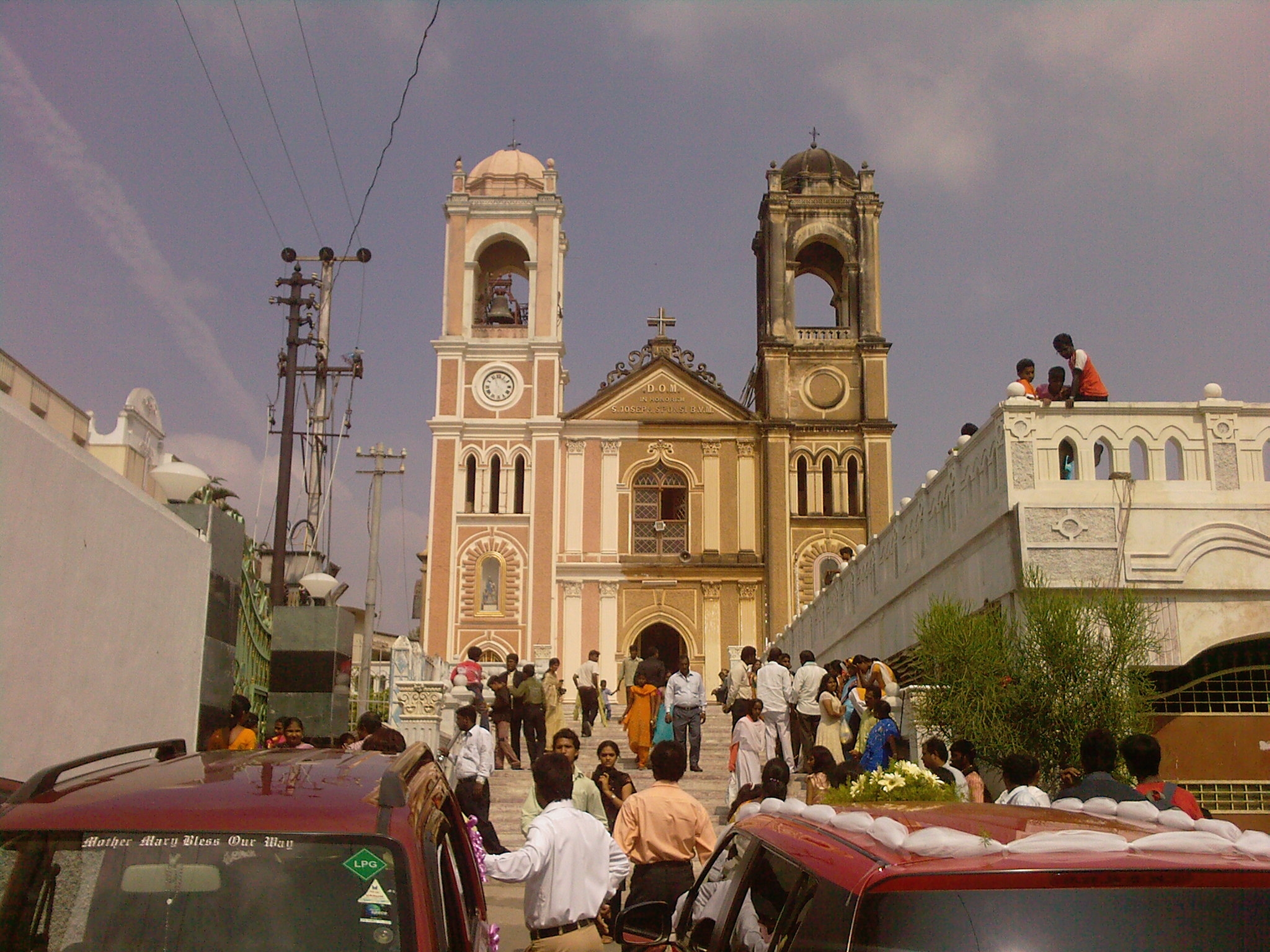
- St Joseph's Cathedral, Hyderabad

Location
- Country: India
- Ecclesiastical province: Hyderabad

Statistics
- Area: 25,319 km^{2} (9,776 sq mi)
- Population: Total; Catholics: (as of 2013); 13,195,000; 114,800 (0.9%)
- Parishes: 94

Information
- Rite: Latin Rite
- Established: 1851; 175 years ago
- Cathedral: St. Joseph’s Cathedral
- Secular priests: 297

Current leadership
- Pope: Leo XIV
- Metropolitan Archbishop: Anthony Poola

The Roman Catholic Metropolitan Archdiocese of Hyderabad (Latin: Hyderabaden(sis)) is an archdiocese located in the city of Hyderabad in India.

== History ==
- 1851: Established as the Apostolic Vicariate of Hyderabad from the Apostolic Vicariate of Madras
- 1 September 1886: Promoted as the Diocese of Hyderabad
- 19 September 1953: Promoted as the Metropolitan Archdiocese of Hyderabad

== Ordinaries ==
=== Archbishops of Hyderabad ===
Sl.No	Name	Designation	Year of appointment	Last year of service
1	Joseph Mark Gopu	Archbishop	1953	1971
2	Samineni Arulappa	Archbishop	1971	2000
3	Marampudi Joji	Archbishop	2000	2010
4	Thumma Bala	Archbishop	2011	2020
5	Anthony Poola	Archbishop	2020	present

=== Bishops of Hyderabad ===
Sl.No	Name	Designation	Year of appointment	Last year of service
1	Pietro Caprotti, P.I.M.E.	Bishop	1886	1897
2	Pierre-André Viganò, P.I.M.E.	Bishop	1897	1909
3	Dionigi Vismara	Bishop	1909	1948
4	Alphonsus Beretta, P.I.M.E.	Bishop	1950	1953
5	Joseph Mark Gopu	Bishop	1953	1953

=== Vicars Apostolic of Hyderabad ===
Sl.No	Name	Designation	Year of appointment	Last year of service
1	Daniel Murphy	Vicar Apostolic	1851	1865
2	Jean-Dominique Barbero, P.I.M.E.	Vicar Apostolic	1870	1881
3	Pietro Caprotti, P.I.M.E.	Vicar Apostolic	1882	1886

== Suffragan dioceses ==
- Adilabad
- Cuddapah
- Khammam
- Kurnool
- Nalgonda
- Warangal
