= Diocese of Cuddapah =

Roman Catholic diocese in Andhra Pradesh, India

Coordinates: 14.4751°N 78.8117°E

Diocese of Kadapa Dioecesis kadapahensis

Location
- Country: India
- Ecclesiastical province: Hyderabad
- Metropolitan: Hyderabad
- Deaneries: 5

Statistics
- Area: 15,359 km^{2} (5,930 sq mi)
- Population: Total; Catholics: (as of 2013); 6,772,265; 1,34,145 (2.0%)
- Parishes: 66

Information
- Rite: Latin Rite
- Cathedral: St. Mary’s Cathedral, Mariapuram
- Secular priests: 147

Current leadership
- Pope: Leo XIV
- Bishop: Saginala Paul prakash
- Metropolitan Archbishop: Anthony Poola
- Vicar General: Rev.Fr.Prasad Rao M D

Website
- Website of the Diocese

The Roman Catholic Diocese of kadapa (Latin: kadapahen(sis)) is a diocese located in the city of Kadapa in the ecclesiastical province of Hyderabad in India.

Presently, there are about 66 parishes catering to 81,580 Catholics in the diocese.

== History ==
- 19 October 1976: Established as the Diocese of Kadapa from the Diocese of Nellore

== Leadership ==
- Bishops of Kadapa (Latin Rite)
  - Bishop Gali Bali (11 December 2018-08 March 2025)
  - Bishop Gallela Prasad (31 January 2008 – 10 December 2018)
  - Bishop Doraboina Moses Prakasam (26 July 2002 – 7 December 2006)
  - Bishop Prakash Mallavarapu (22 May 1998 – 26 July 2002)
  - Bishop Abraham Aruliah Somavarapa (28 October 1976 – 24 January 1998)

== Notes ==
Chittoor District will have a New Diocese in Kuppam soon. Kuppam Diocese will be connected and serve Dharmapuri and Kadapa Dioceses.
