= Filippo Gagliardi =

Italian painter

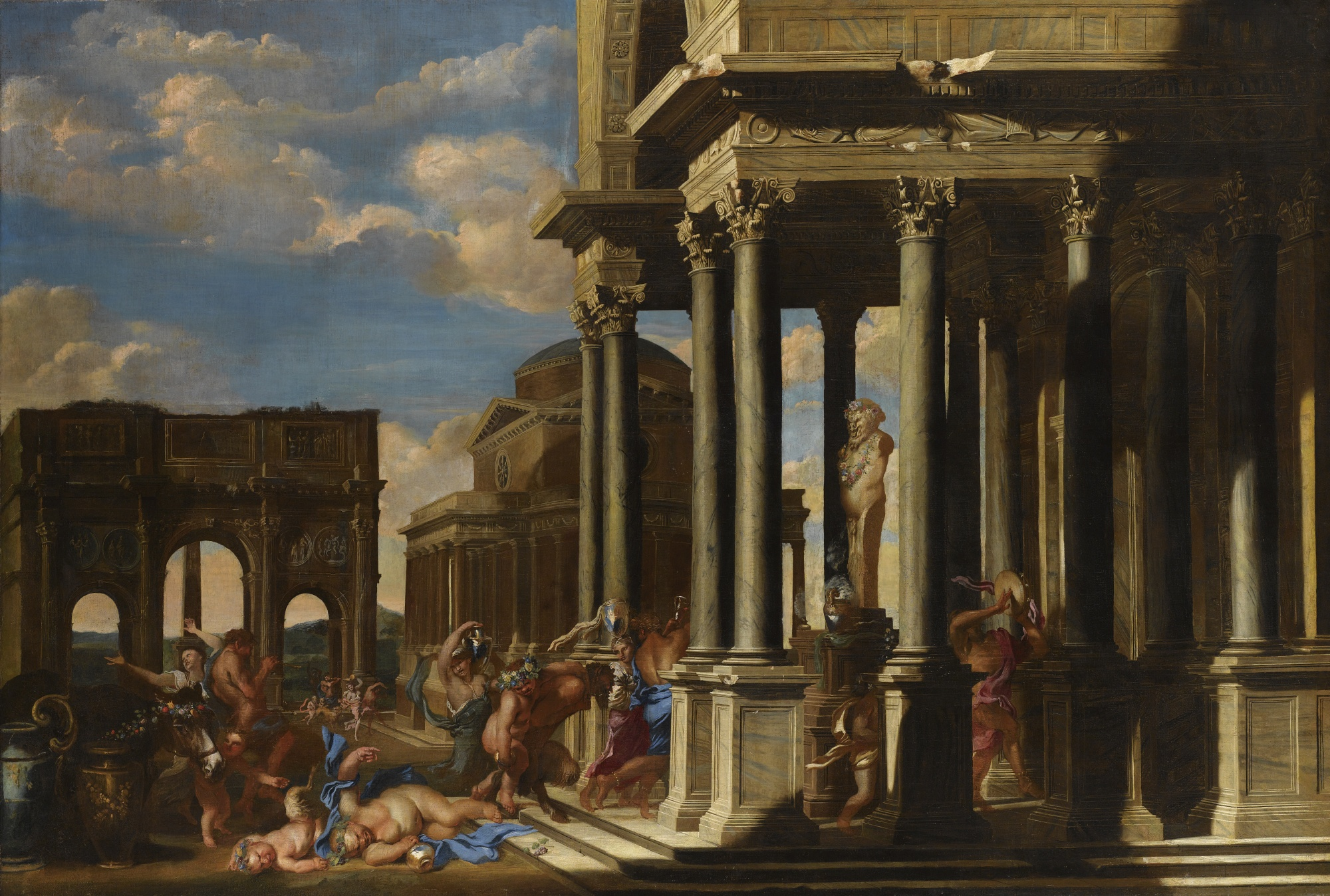
Architectural Capriccio with a Bacchanalian Procession, Filippo Gagliardi (architecture) and Giovanni Benedetto Castiglione (figures)

Filippo Gagliardi (c. 1606 – 1659) was an Italian painter of the Baroque period, active mainly in Rome, who specialized in painting architecture. He collaborated with Filippo Lauri, Andrea Sacchi and Giovanni Benedetto Castiglione. He also helped in the renovation of San Martino ai Monti (1647–1654). He contributed illustrated architectural perspectives to Ferrari's Hesperides (1646). He was a member of the Accademia di San Luca from at least 1638 and became principe in 1656–1658. He was also a member of the Congregazione dei Virtuosi del Pantheon. He produced numerous architectural paintings showing grand structures in strong chiaroscuro, including a set of four in the Palazzo Pallavicini-Rospigliosi in Rome, with figure by the Genoese painter Giovanni Benedetto Castiglione, and two in the Musée de Peinture e de Sculpture, Grenoble (inv. MG767, 768). He was also known as 'Filippo delle Prospettive'. His works are sometimes confused with those by Viviano Codazzi. He also appears to confused with Giovanni Francesco Gagliardi.
