= San Martino ai Monti =

- Basilica of Saints Sylvester and Martin on the Mountains
- Basilica dei Santi Silvestro e Martino ai Monti
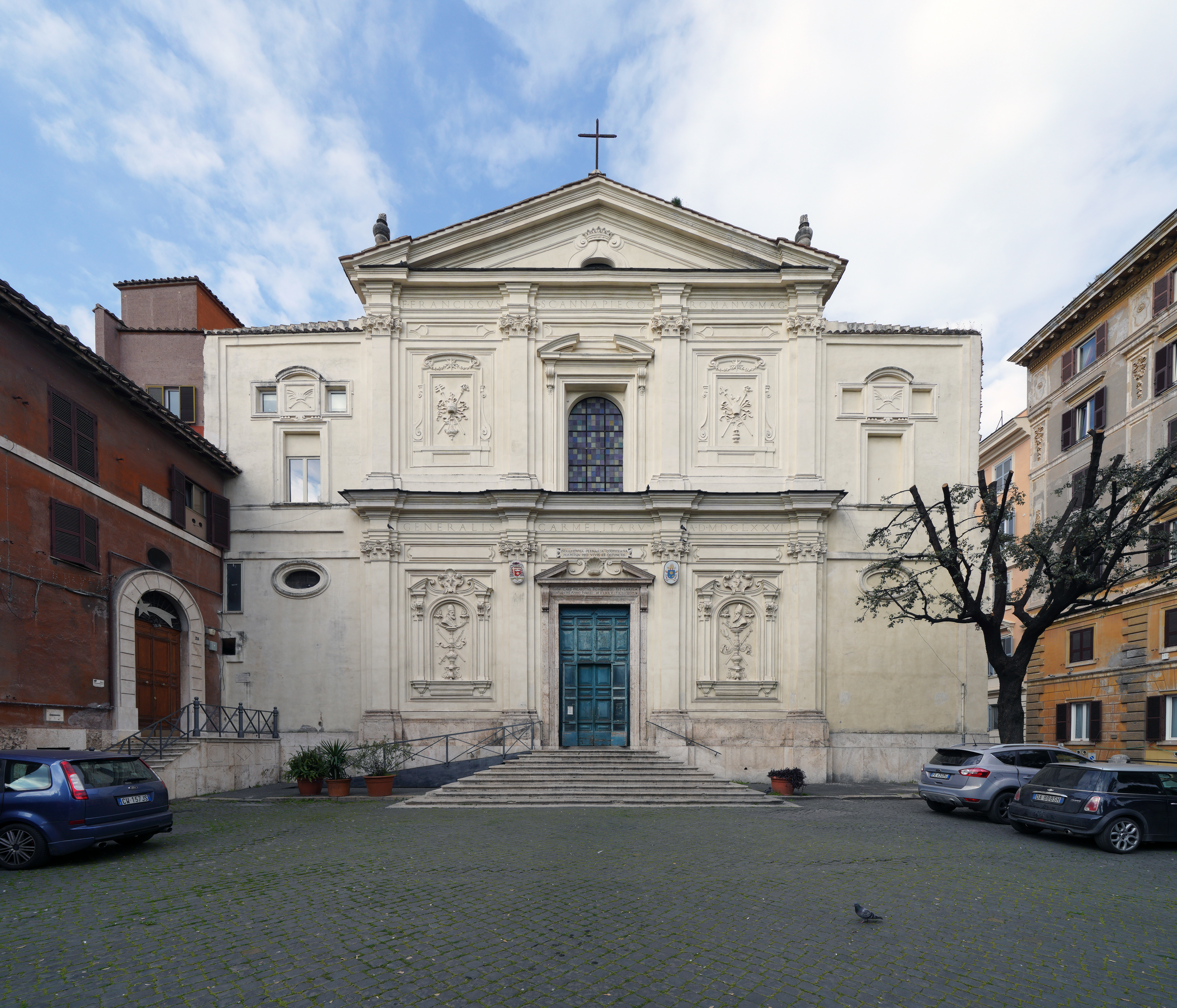
- Façade
- Click on the map for a fullscreen view
- 41°53′40″N 12°29′54″E
- Location: Viale del Monte Oppio 28, Rome
- Country: Italy
- Language: Italian
- Denomination: Catholic
- Tradition: Roman Rite
- Religious order: Carmelites
- Website: parrocchiasanmartinoaimonti.it

History
- Status: titular church, minor basilica
- Founded: 4th century
- Dedication: Pope Sylvester I and Martin of Tours

Architecture
- Architect(s): Filippo Gagliardi, Pietro da Cortona
- Architectural type: Baroque
- Completed: 1780

Administration
- Diocese: Roma

San Martino ai Monti, officially known as Santi Silvestro e Martino ai Monti ("Saints Sylvester & Martin in the Mountains"), is a minor basilica in Rome, Italy, in the Rione Monti neighbourhood. It is located near the edge of the Parco del Colle Oppio, near the corner of Via Equizia and Viale del Monte Oppio, about five to six blocks south of Santa Maria Maggiore.

The current Cardinal Priest with title to the basilica is Kazimierz Nycz, the Archbishop of Warsaw. Among the previous titulars are Alfonso de la Cueva; Joseph Mary Tomasi, C.R.; Achille Ratti, later Pope Pius XI; Ildefonso Schuster, O.S.B.; and Gianbattista Montini, later Pope Paul VI.

The parish is served by members of the Italian Province of the Carmelite Order and the residence next door to the church houses the offices of the Province.

== History ==
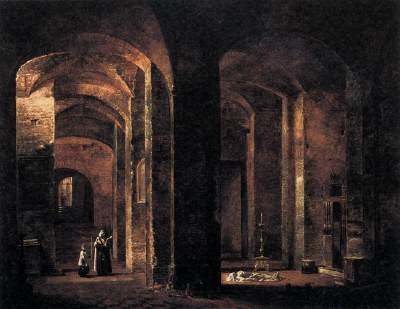
The Crypt of San Martino ai Monti, by François Marius Granet (1806).

The basilica was founded by Pope Sylvester I on a site donated by one Equitius (hence the name of Titulus Equitii) in the 4th century. At the beginning it was an oratory devoted to all the martyrs. It is known that a meeting in preparation for the Council of Nicaea was held here in 324. The current church of San Martino ai Monti dates from the Carolingian era, but remains of a 3rd-century pillared hall have been located below and adjacent to it. Some scholars have identified this earlier building with the Titulus Equitii, but according to Hugo Brandenburg, it is "most unlikely that it could have served as a place of worship for any larger community and its liturgy: The original purpose of this fairly modest hall ... was probably to serve as a storage space for commercial purposes."

In 500, the church was rebuilt and dedicated to Saints Martin of Tours and Pope Sylvester I by Pope Symmachus. On this occasion, the church was elevated and the first oratory became subterranean. It was reconstructed by Pope Hadrian I in 772 and by Pope Sergius II in 845. The structure of the present basilica follows the ancient church, and many pieces had been re-used. Remains of Pope St Martin I were said to be transferred there following his death in the 7th century in the Crimea region.

During the Investiture Controversy and the Gregorian Reforms, the priest of San Martino, Beno, supported the Antipope Clement III.

The inscriptions found in S. Martino ai Monti, a valuable source illustrating the history of the Basilica, have been collected and published by Vincenzo Forcella.

The basilica is served by the members of the Italian Province of the Carmelite Order. It was granted to them in 1299 by Pope Boniface VIII; their ownership was confirmed in 1559. This basilica is the resting place of the Blessed Angelo Paoli, O. Carm., (1642–1720) who was revered throughout Rome for his service of the poor; he was beatified on 25 April 2010.

== Interior ==
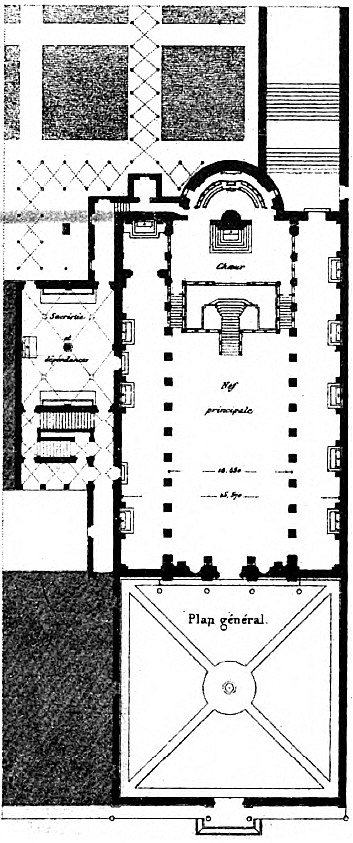
Plan of the Basilica

The interior has a nave and two aisles, divided by ancient columns. A votive lamp, made in silver sheet and housed in the sacristy, was believed to be St. Sylvester's tiara. Under the major altar are preserved the relics of Saints Artemius, Paulina and Sisinnius, brought here from the Catacomb of Priscilla. A mosaic portraying Madonna with St Sylvester is from the 6th century.

=== Interior decoration ===
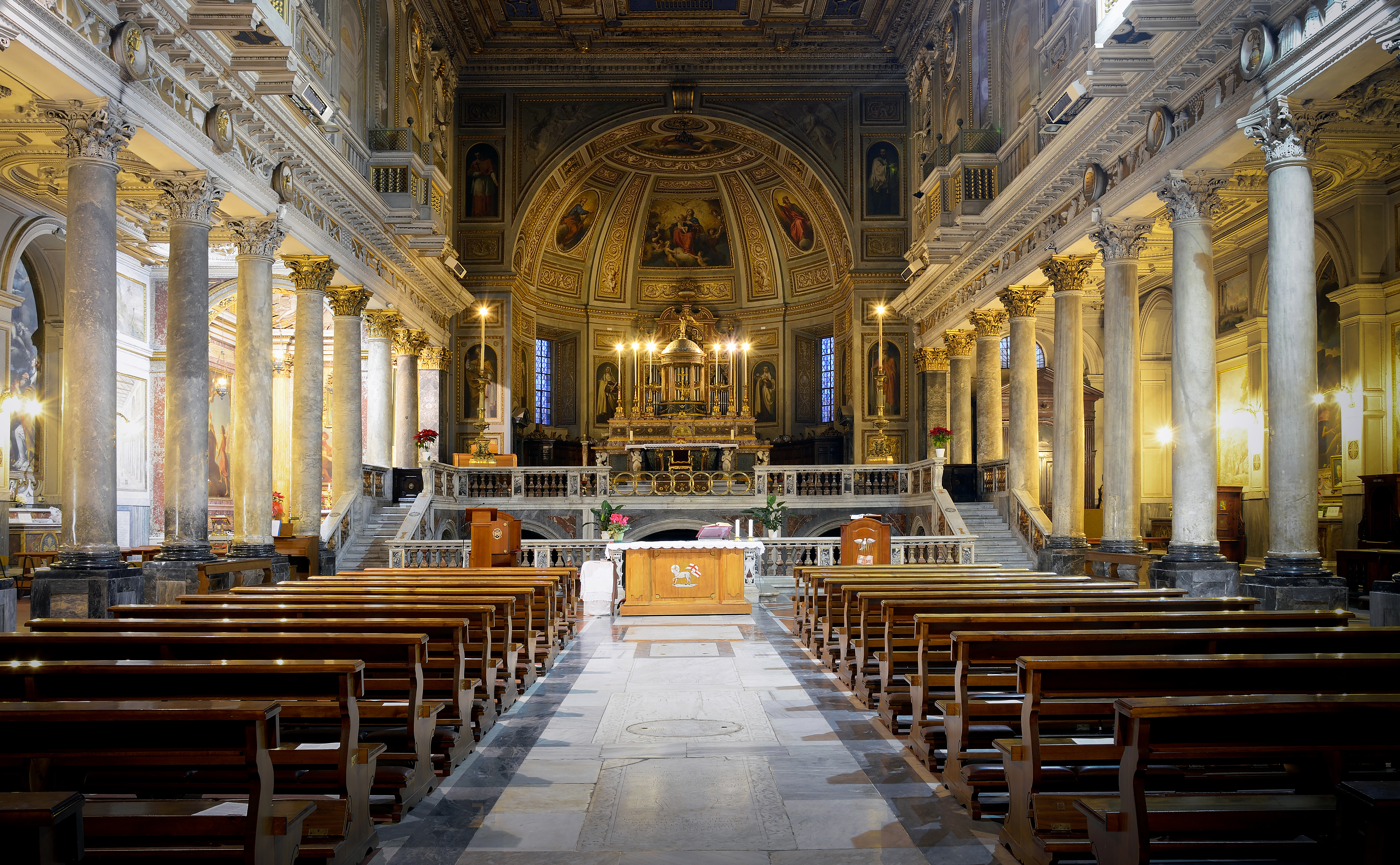
Interior of San Martino ai Monti.

Further transformations were executed in the 17th century by Filippo Gagliardi. In the mid-17th century a series of frescoes, architectural additions, and altarpieces were commissioned including series landscape and architectural frescoes of typically biblical scenes by Gaspar Dughet and Galgliardi.

There is a fresco by Jan Miel of St Cyril Baptizing a Sultan. Fabrizio Chiari (now overpainted by Antonio Cavallucci) painted a Baptism of Christ. Giannangiolo Canini painted an altarpiece of Holy Trinity with Saints Nicola and Bartholemew. The Mannerist painter Girolamo Muziano provided an altarpiece of St. Albert. Galeazzo Leoncino painted a fresco of Pope Silvester holding the Council of 324 in the church of San Martino, Pietro Testa the Vision of St Angelo the Carmelite in the Wilderness, and Filippo Gherardi an altarpiece of San Carlo Borromeo. Cannini also painted the Martydom of St. Stephen. Chiari also painted St Martin Sharing His Cloak with the Beggar. Giovanni Battista Crespi is the author of a Vision of St Teresa, while the altarpiece of Vision of Santa Maria Maddalena de' Pazzi was executed by Matteo Piccione.

Paolo Naldini painted a series of Saints on the upper register of the nave (counterclockwise starting from the nave, they are identified as Ciriaca, Stephen, Fabianus, and Nicander, then, in the left nave, Theodore, Martin, Innocent, and Iusta). Daniele Latre painted a St. Anthony and John the Baptist on the southern wall (counterfacade), while Naldini painted a Peter and Paul.

== List of Cardinal-Priests since 1088 ==
List of the cardinal titulars of the church

- Pietro Senex (1088 - about 1099)
- Benedict (1099 - about 1102)
- Domnizzone (about 1102 - about 1122)
- Boniface (or Bonifacio) (?) (1105 ? - ?)
- Pietro Cariaceno (1122 or 1123 - about 1138)
- Matteo (about 1138 - January 1139 deceased)
- Egmondo (or Edmondo) (1139 - about 1145 deceased)
- Robert Pullen (1142 - 1146 deceased)
  - Giovanni Mercone (1150 - 1169 deceased), pseudo-cardinal of the antipopes Victor IV and Paschal III
- János Struma (?) (1163 ? - 1165 ?)
  - Stephen (1172 - 1173), pseudo-cardinal of the antipope Callistus III
- Rolando Paparoni (1184 - 1189)
- Alessandro (May 1189 - 1190 deceased)
- Ugo Bobone (or Uguccione Thieneo) (September 1190 - March 9, 1206 deceased)
- Guala Bicchieri (or Beccaria), C.R.S.A. (1211 - 1227 died)
- François Cassard (1237 - 7 August 1237 died)
- Simone Paltanieri (or Paltineri) (17 December 1261 - 1277 died)
- Gervais Jeancolet de Clinchamp (12 April 1281 - 15 September 1287 died)
- Benedetto Caetani senior (22 September 1291 - 24 December 1294 elected pope)
- Gentile Portino da Montefiore (or Partino), O.Min. (2 March 1300 - 27 October 1312 died)
- Vital du Four, O.Min. (December 23, 1312 - June 1321 appointed Cardinal Bishop of Albano)
- Pierre de Chappes (December 18, 1327 - March 24, 1336 died)
- Aymeric de Chalus (September 20, 1342 - October 31, 1349 died)
- Pierre de Cros (December 17, 1350 - September 23, 1361 died)
- Gilles Aycelin de Montaigu (September 17, 1361 - 1368 appointed Cardinal Bishop of Frascati)
- Filippo Carafa della Serra (September 18, 1378 - May 22, 1389)
  - Nicolas de Saint-Saturnin, O.P. (18 December 1378 - 23 January 1382 deceased), pseudocardinal of the antipope Clement VII
  - Faydit d'Aigrefeuille, O.S.B.Clun. (December 23, 1383 - October 2, 1391 died), pseudo-cardinal of the antipope Clement VII
- Bartolomeo Mezzavacca (December 18, 1389 - July 20, 1396 died)
  - Pedro Serra (September 22, 1397 - October 8, 1404 died), pseudo-cardinal of the antipope Benedict XIII
- Angelo Cybo, deaconry pro illa vice (February 27, 1402 - 1404 ? died)
- Giordano Orsini (June 12, 1405 - March 25, 1409 appointed cardinal-priest of San Lorenzo in Damaso)
- Guillaume d'Estouteville (January 8, 1440 - 1459 appointed cardinal-priest of Santa Pudenziana)[1]
  - Johannes Grünwalder (October 2, 1440 - January 15 1448 dismissed), pseudo-cardinal of the antipope Felix V (did not accept the promotion)
- Jean Jouffroy, O.S.B.Clun. (1461 - 24 November 1473 died)
- Charles II of Bourbon (15 January 1477 - 17 September 1488 died)
- André d'Espinay (23 March 1489 - 10 November 1500 died)
- Tamás Bakócz (5 October 1500 - 11 June 1521 died)
- Louis de Bourbon-Vendôme (11 June 1521 - 3 March 1533 appointed Cardinal Priest of Santa Sabina)
- Jean d'Orléans-Longueville (3 March 1533 - 24 September 1533 died)
- Philippe de la Chambre, O.S.B.Clun. (November 10, 1533 - March 23, 1541 appointed Cardinal Priest of Santa Prassede)
- Uberto Gambara (March 23, 1541 - February 15, 1542 appointed Cardinal Priest of Sant'Apollinare)
- Giovanni Vincenzo Acquaviva d'Aragona (June 12, 1542 - August 16, 1546 died)
- Girolamo Verallo (May 10, 1549 - November 29, 1553 appointed Cardinal Priest of San Marcello)
- Diomede Carafa (January 13, 1556 - August 12, 1560 died)
- Charles Borromeo, deaconry pro illa vice (September 4, 1560 - June 4, 1563); (June 4, 1563 - November 17, 1564)
- Philibert Babou de la Bourdaisière (November 17, 1564 - May 14, 1568 appointed Cardinal Priest of Sant'Anastasia)
- Girolamo di Corregio (May 14, 1568 - June 9, 1570 appointed Cardinal Priest of Santa Prisca)
- Gaspar Cervantes de Gaeta (June 16, 1570 - January 23, 1572 appointed Cardinal Priest of Santa Balbina)
- Gabriele Paleotti (July 5, 1572 - May 11, 1587 appointed Cardinal Priest of San Lorenzo in Lucina)
- William Allen (August 31, 1587 - October 16, 1594 deceased)
- Francesco Cornaro (June 21, 1596 - April 23 1598 deceased)
- Fernando Niño de Guevara (January 8, 1599 - January 8, 1609 deceased)
- Domenico Rivarola (September 12, 1611 - January 3, 1627 deceased)
- Vacant title (1627 - 1633)
- Alfonso de la Cueva-Benavides y Mendoza-Carrillo (July 18, 1633 - July 9, 1635 appointed Cardinal Priest of Santa Balbina)
- Pier Luigi Carafa (July 10, 1645 - February 15, 1655 deceased)
- Federico Sforza (June 26, 1656 - April 21, 1659 appointed Cardinal Priest of Sant'Anastasia)
- Volumnio Bandinelli (April 19, 1660 - June 5, 1667 deceased)
- Giulio Spinola (July 18, 1667 - November 13, 1684 appointed Cardinal Priest of San Crisogono)
- Vacant title (1684 - 1689)
- Opizio Pallavicini (November 14, 1689 - February 11, 1700 died)
- Marcello d'Aste (March 30, 1700 - June 11, 1709 died)
- Giuseppe Maria Tomasi di Lampedusa, C.R. (July 11, 1712 - January 1, 1713 died)
- Niccolò Caracciolo (February 5, 1716 - February 7, 1728 died)
- Giovanni Antonio Guadagni, O.C.D. (December 17, 1731 - February 23, 1750 appointed Cardinal Bishop of Frascati)
- Vacant title (1750 - 1754)
- Giovanni Francesco Stoppani (May 20, 1754 - July 18, 1763 appointed Cardinal Bishop of Palestrina)
- Vacant title (1763 - 1773)
- Francesco Saverio de Zelada (April 26, 1773 - June 17, 1793); in commendam (June 17, 1793 - December 19, 1801 deceased)
- Luigi Ruffo Scilla (August 9, 1802 - November 17, 1832 deceased)
- Ugo Pietro Spinola (December 17, 1832 - January 21, 1858 deceased)
- Antonio Benedetto Antonucci (March 18, 1858 - January 29, 1879 deceased)
- Pier Francesco Meglia (February 27, 1880 - March 31, 1883 deceased)
- Vacant title (1883 - 1887)
- Luigi Giordani (March 17, 1887 - April 21, 1893 deceased)
- Kolos Ferenc Vaszary, O.S.B. (June 15, 1893 - September 3, 1915 deceased)
- Giulio Tonti (December 9, 1915 - December 11, 1918 deceased)
- Achille Ratti, O.SS.C.A. (June 16, 1921 - February 6, 1922 elected Pope)
- Eugenio Tosi, O.SS.C.A. (December 14, 1922 - January 7, 1929 deceased)
- Alfredo Ildefonso Schuster, O.S.B.Cas. (July 18, 1929 - August 30, 1954 deceased)
- Giovanni Battista Montini (December 18, 1958 - June 21, 1963 elected Pope)
- Giovanni Colombo (February 25, 1965 - May 20, 1992 deceased)
- Armand Gaétan Razafindratandra (November 26, 1994 - January 9, 2010 deceased)
- Kazimierz Nycz, since November 20, 2010

== Bibliography ==
- Emmanuele Boaga, "Il complesso titolare di S. Martino ai Monti in Roma," in: Mario Fois, Vincenzo Monachino, F. Litva (editors), Dalla Chiesa antica alla Chiesa moderna. Miscellanea per il 50o della Facoltà di storia ecclesiastica della Pontificia Università Gregoriana (Roma: Università Gregoriana Editore, 1983) pp. 1-17.
- Ancient Churches of Rome from the Fourth to the Seventh Century: The Dawn of Christian Architecture in the West, by Hugo Brandenburg, Brepols, 2005.
- Le chiese medievali di Roma, by Federico Gizzi, Newton Compton, Rome, 1994.
- Richard Krautheimer, Corpus Basilicarum Christianarum Romae: The Early Christian Basilicas of Rome (IV-IX Cent.) Part 3 (Roma: Pontificio Istituto de archeologia cristiana, 1937), pp. 87 ff.

Preceded by Santa Maria della Vittoria, Rome	Landmarks of Rome; San Martino ai Monti	Succeeded by Santi Nereo e Achilleo
