= Alfredo Ildefonso Schuster =

Italian Catholic Benedictine monk and prelate

The Blessed Alfredo Ildefonso Schuster, O.S.B.
- Cardinal Archbishop of Milan
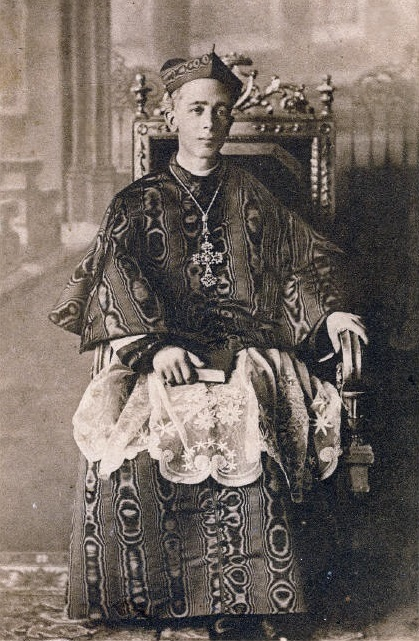
- Formal portrait, c. 1930
- Church: Catholic Church
- Archdiocese: Milan
- See: Milan
- Appointed: 26 June 1929
- Term ended: 30 August 1954
- Predecessor: Eugenio Tosi
- Successor: Giovanni Battista Montini
- Other post: Cardinal-Priest of Santi Silvestro e Martino ai Monti (1929–54)
- Previous posts: Abbot of San Paolo fuori le Mura (1918–29); Rector of the Pontifical Oriental Institute (1919–22); President of the Italian Episcopal Conference (1952–53)

Orders
- Ordination: 19 March 1904 by Pietro Respighi
- Consecration: 21 July 1929 by Pope Pius XI
- Created cardinal: 15 July 1929 by Pope Pius XI
- Rank: Cardinal-Priest

Personal details
- Born: Alfredo Ludovico Schuster; 18 January 1880 Ospedale Santissimo Salvatore, Rome, Kingdom of Italy
- Died: 30 August 1954 (aged 74) Archiepiscopal Seminary Pio XI, Venegono Inferiore, Varese, Italy
- Buried: Cathedral of Milan
- Coat of arms: Alfredo Ildefonso Schuster, O.S.B.'s coat of arms

Sainthood
- Feast day: 30 August
- Venerated in: Catholic Church (Italy)
- Beatified: 12 May 1996; Saint Peter's Square, Vatican City by Pope John Paul II
- Attributes: Pastoral staff; Cardinal's attire
- Patronage: Archdiocese of Milan

Ordination history of Alfredo Ildefonso Schuster
History
Priestly ordination
- Ordained by: Pietro Respighi
Episcopal consecration
- Principal consecrator: Pope Pius XI
- Co-consecrators: Carlo Cremonesi; Agostino Zampini
Cardinalate
- Elevated by: Pope Pius XI
Episcopal succession
Bishops consecrated by Alfredo Ildefonso Schuster as principal consecrator
- Arcangelo Mazzotti, O.F.M.: 26 April 1931
- Francesco Fulgenzio Lazzati, O.F.M.: 8 November 1931
- Adriano Bernareggi: 24 January 1932
- Giacinto Tredici, Obl.Ss.A.C.: 6 January 1934
- Rodolfo Orler, F.S.C.J.: 7 February 1934
- Gustavo Testa: 1 November 1934
- Pietro Mozzanica, Ob.S.C.: 23 December 1934
- Enrico Montalbetti, Obs.S.C.: 9 June 1935
- Giovanni Luigi Marinoni, O.F.M. Cap.: 23 August 1936
- Paolo Castiglioni: 7 February 1937
- Domenico Grassi, P.I.M.E.: 1 May 1939
- Norberto Perini: 30 November 1941
- Ildebrando Vannucci, O.S.B.: 2 August 1942
- Domenico Bernareggi: 29 July 1945
- Egidio Bignamini: 2 December 1945
- Giuseppe Obert, P.I.M.E.: 6 February 1949
- Giovanni Battista Cesana, M.C.C.I.: 1 April 1951
- Alfonso Beretta, P.I.M.E.: 8 April 1951
- Vitale Bonifacio Bertoli, O.F.M.: 20 May 1951
- Anacleto Cazzaniga: 19 March 1953
- Costantino Caminada: 29 June 1953
- Agostino Saba: 4 October 1953

Alfredo Ildefonso Schuster, O.S.B. (Italian pronunciation: [alˈfreːdo ildeˈfɔnso ʃˈʃuster], German: [ˈʃuːstɐ]; born Alfredo Ludovico Schuster; 18 January 1880 – 30 August 1954) was an Italian Catholic prelate and professed member of the Benedictines who served as the Archbishop of Milan from 1929 until his death. He took the religious name of Ildefonso as a Benedictine monk and served as an abbot prior to his elevation to the cardinalate.

He led the Milanese archdiocese during World War II and was known to have supported fascism at first. His views changed to opposition after the annexation of Austria and the introduction of Italian racial laws, which prompted vocal criticisms of anti-Christian aspects of Benito Mussolini's regime.

Schuster's beatification was celebrated in mid-1996 in Saint Peter's Square.

== Life ==
=== Childhood and priesthood ===
Alfredo Ludovico Schuster was born on 18 January 1880 in the Ospedale Santissimo Salvatore in Rome to Johann Schuster (1819–1889), a Bavarian tailor and double widower, and Maria Anna Tutzer (1849–1912), who hailed from Bolzano. Johann was three decades older than Tutzer. His sister Giulia entered the Vincentians as a nun. He also had three half-siblings from his father's second marriage. Schuster was baptized on 20 January as "Alfredo Ludovico Luigi". In his childhood, he was kidnapped for a brief period, but the kidnapper was arrested.

Schuster received his Confirmation on 2 April 1887 from Monsignor Giulio Lenti and made his First Communion on Pentecost 1890 in the church of Sant'Anna in Porta Angelica. His father Johann died on 18 September 1889.

He served as an altar server at the Santa Maria della Pietà in Camposanto dei Teutonici church next to Saint Peter's Basilica. Schuster completed his high school studies (ginnasiali and liceali) at the Basilica of Saint Paul Outside the Walls in November 1891. On 13 November 1898, he joined the Order of Saint Benedict at their novitiate at Saint Paul Outside the Walls when he took the name Ildefonso. He later professed his monastic vows on 13 November 1900. He graduated with a Doctor of Philosophy on 14 June 1903 and later received a doctorate in theology from the Pontifical Atheneum of Saint Anselm in Rome.

Schuster received his ordination as a priest on 19 March 1904 at the patriarchal Lateran Basilica in Rome from Cardinal Pietro Respighi (its archpriest). He returned to the Basilica of Saint Paul Outside the Walls in 1904. His two mentors during his time of education were Father Bonifacio Oslander and Tommaso Riccardi.

=== Abbacy ===
He became the novice master in 1908 and prior in 1916 before he was elected as the abbot for Saint Paul Outside the Walls on 6 April 1918. He also received the abbatial blessing from Cardinal Basilio Pompili on 14 April there. He served as the Procurator General for the Cassinese Congregation from 1914 to 1929 and also served as the President of the Pontifical Oriental Institute from 1919 to 1922. He visited the seminaries of the northern Lombard region as well as those in the southern regions of Campania and Calabria from 1924 to 1928. Either in November or December 1926, he preached the spiritual exercises to Angelo Giuseppe Roncalli (the future Pope John XXIII) at Saint Paul Outside the Walls. While abbot he was made a consulter to the Congregation for Rites and the Congregation for the Oriental Churches.

=== Episcopate and cardinalate ===
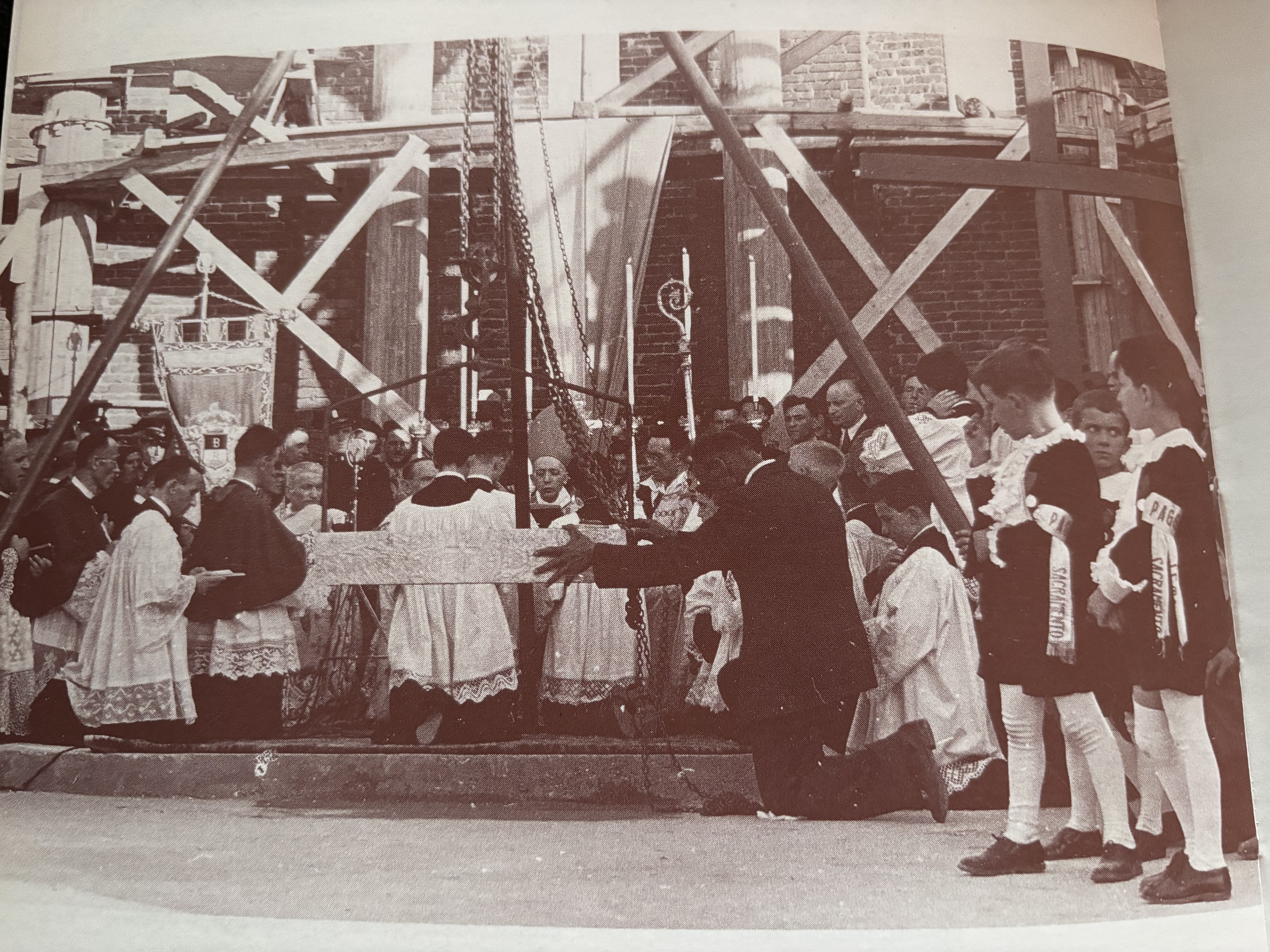
Cardinal Schuster consecrating the first stone of the Church of St. Edward, 1938

Schuster was named Archbishop of Milan on 26 June 1929 to succeed Eugenio Tosi. On the following 13 July, he took the oath of allegiance to the Italian state in front of King Vittorio Emanuele III; he was the first Italian bishop to do this since the new Lateran Concordat required it according to Article 20 of the concordat. Pope Pius XI elevated Schuster to the cardinalate in 1929 as the Cardinal-Priest of Santi Silvestro e Martino ai Monti. Carlo Cremonesi and Agostino Zampini served as the co-consecrators. In 1933, he was conferred as a Bailiff Grand Cross of honour and devotion to the Order of Malta.

Schuster ordained 1265 priests and consecrated 22 bishops during his tenure as archbishop. He also made five pastoral visits during his episcopate and selected Saint Carlo Borromeo as his model as an archbishop. He emphasized the importance of catechetics and promoted the Catholic Action movement for the faithful. He also believed that the goal of all Christians was holiness.

He served as a papal legate on several occasions. On 15 August 1932 he was appointed as the legate to the celebration of Nostra Signora di Caravaggio; on 21 March 1934 to the millennial commemorations of the Einsiedeln convent in Switzerland; on 15 September 1937 to the inauguration of the new facade of the cathedral of Desio; and on 2 August 1951 to the National Eucharistic Conference in Assisi.

He participated in the papal conclave in 1939 which elected Pope Pius XII on the eve of World War II and was even considered as a papabile candidate for those seeking a more pastoral pope.

=== Death ===
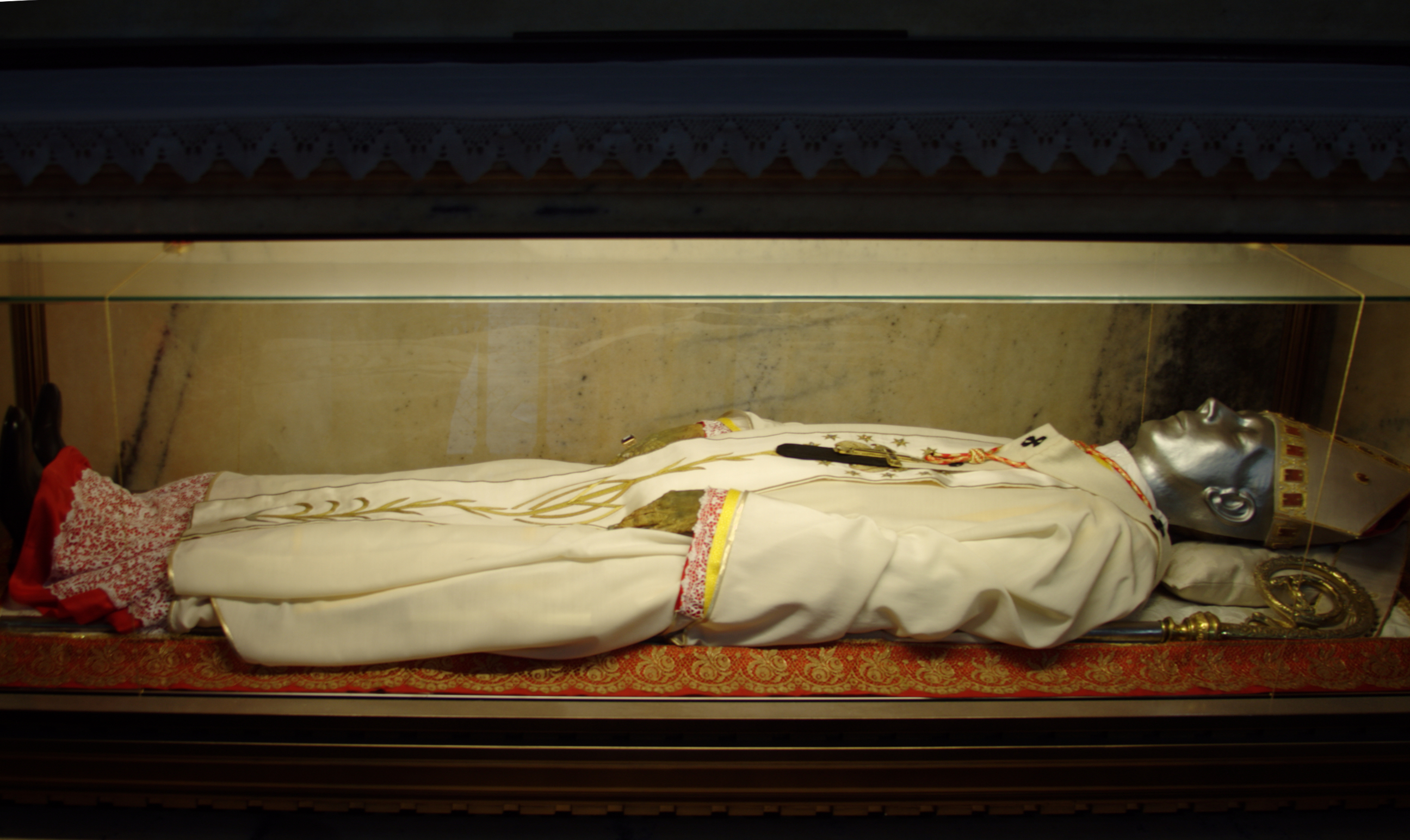
Schuster's tomb in the Cathedral of Milan.

He died on 30 August 1954 at 4:15 am of a heart ailment in the seminary of Venegono Inferiore near Milan. Cardinal Angelo Giuseppe Roncalli (the future Pope John XXIII) celebrated his funeral. He was buried on 2 September 1954 in the metropolitan cathedral next to his two immediate predecessors. His tomb was opened on 28 January 1985, and his remains were found to be intact.

=== Honours ===
- Schuster was honoured with the Order of the Holy Sepulchre
- In 1933, the cardinal was conferred the honour of Bailiff Knight Grand Cross of Honour and Devotion of the Order of Malta.

== Relations with fascism ==
There were claims during the process for Schuster's beatification that he was supportive of Italian fascism. While there is evidence of some support for fascist ambitions, there is also evidence that he denounced the anti-Christian element of fascism. It was said that he refused to participate in ceremonies involving Mussolini and also condemned racist legislation during the fascist period.

After the signing of the Lateran Pacts of 1929, Schuster thought it was possible to Christianize Italian society within the framework of the Fascist state, so he considered it necessary to collaborate with it only if the scope and prerogatives of the Church were protected. In June 1929, at the time of his appointment as Archbishop, Minister of Justice Alfredo Rocco described Schuster as a Fascist "regime sympathizer". On 21 March 1930, in the anniversary of the foundation of the Fasci di Combattimento, Schuster spoke of a "mission of salvation" being entrusted to the Duce, which caused confusion among some Catholics.

Schuster was an enthusiastic supporter of the Italian invasion of Ethiopia in 1935, compared it to the Crusades, and viewed it as a potential source of converts. On 28 October 1935, while celebrating Mass in the Cathedral of Milan, he asked God to protect the Italian troops as "they open the door of Ethiopia to the Catholic faith and Roman civilisation" before he blessed the banners of the departing troops.

In a speech at the School of Fascist Mystique in Rome in 1937, he spelt out a fanciful direct link between Imperial Rome and Christian Rome to fascism: "God has chosen to reward the Duce by drawing his historical figure closer to the great spirits of Constantine and Augustus, through the work of Benito Mussolini reconnecting Rome and its King to a shining new imperial crown of Roman peace."

In 1938, his views changed with Germany's annexation of Austria and its introduction of racial doctrines, reflected then in the Italian Racial Laws of 1938.

=== Relationship with Mussolini ===
The Italian fascist and German Nazi press attacked Schuster during the war, without his suffering loss of esteem among his own flock in Milan. On 25 April 1945, the cardinal hosted in the archbishop's residence in Milan a meeting between Italian partisans and Mussolini in an attempt to reach a truce between the two parties. However, Mussolini did not accept the demand for unconditional surrender as advanced by the partisan delegates Marazza and Pertini. Mussolini arrived on time at 4:00 pm without the other side being present. The delegates Cadorna and Lombardi, as well as Marazza, arrived an hour later. In the meantime, Mussolini had a conversation with Schuster, who gave him a glass of rosolio to drink and a copy of a book he had written about the life of a saint. Schuster made an effort to preach humility to Mussolini. Varying accounts by participants of what happened in the meeting after Graziani and the other Fascist leaders arrived vary.

Although the cardinal sought Mussolini out on 25 April 1945 and urged him to make his peace with God and his fellow man, Mussolini spurned the admonition and was killed within a week.

Following the end of the war, the cardinal made frequent attempts to emphasize the danger of totalitarianism that communism and fascism inspired.

=== Relations with Nazi Germany ===
In May 1984, United States Department of State and the United States Army declassified documents through the Freedom of Information Act which revealed that, from 1943, Archbishop Schuster maintained relations with Holocaust perpetrator and Nazi officer Walter Rauff, head of the SS in northern Italy, resident at the time in Milan. Rauff had numerous meetings and exchanged letters and gifts with Schuster and his secretary, Monsignor Giuseppe Bicchierai. The two Catholic prelates also acted as envoys for the Holy See while Germany and Italy negotiated secretly with the Allies to surrender at the end of World War II; Rauff was involved in these negotiations, too, and often discussed prisoner exchanges and releases with Bicchierai and Schuster. The Simon Wiesenthal Center released the documents to the public and asked the Holy See to investigate whether Schuster helped Rauff escape from Italy to Chile in order to evade justice. This was the first time high-ranking church officials were mentioned in the context of a "Vatican escape route" for Nazi war criminals.

== Beatification ==
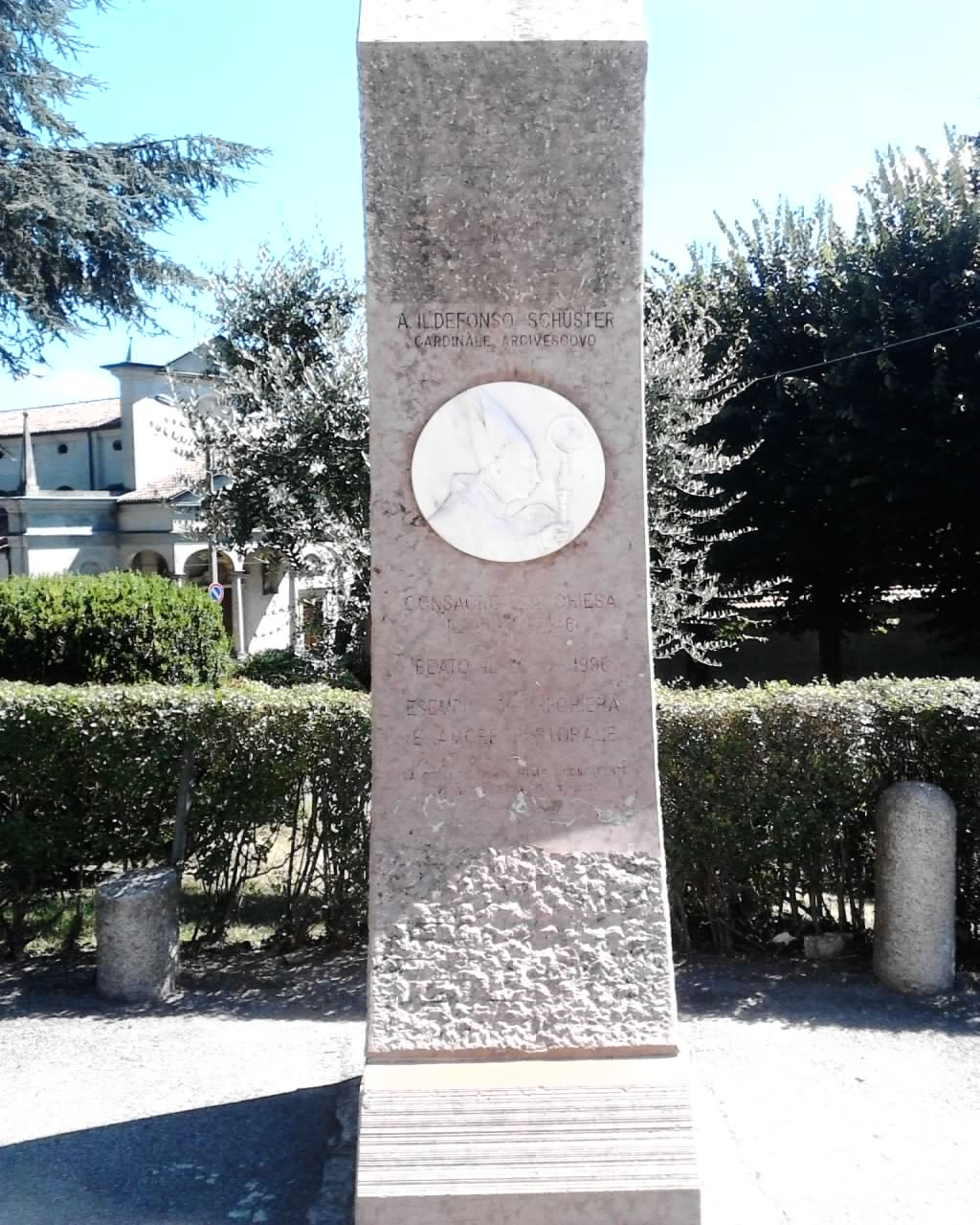
Monument in Verano Brianza.

The process for his beatification opened in Milan in a diocesan process that his successor inaugurated on 30 August 1957; that first phase was concluded on 31 October 1963 after a process was held in Rome from 21 November 1959 to 13 July 1961 to collect additional evidence and documentation. Schuster's writings were approved on 5 March 1970 as having adhered to traditional doctrine. The cause remained dormant for some time until 18 July 1986 when the Congregation for the Causes of Saints validated the diocesan phase while later receiving the Positio for assessment in 1989. Theologians approved the cause on 12 October 1993 as did subsequently the members of the Congregation for the Causes of the Saints on 11 January 1994. Pope John Paul II confirmed that Schuster had led a life of heroic virtue and accorded him the title Venerable on 26 March 1994.

Schuster's beatification now depended upon one confirmed miracle. One such case was investigated, and the evidence collected was sent to the Congregation in Rome, which validated the report on 5 July 1985. Medical experts confirmed this miracle as such a decade later, on 17 November 1994, while theologians confirmed the assessment on 21 February 1995; the Congregation itself approved it on 2 May 1995. On 11 July 1995, John Paul II confirmed that the healing in question was a miracle and decreed Schuster's beatification. He celebrated the beatification at a solemn Mass in Saint Peter's Square on 12 May 1996.

The miracle that led to his beatification was the cure of the nun Maria Emilia Brusati from a severe glaucoma.

== See also ==
- Cardinal electors for the papal conclave, 1939
- Incorruptibility
- List of beatified people

== Sources ==
- Chadwick, Owen (1988), Britain and the Vatican During the Second World War, New York: Cambridge University Press, ISBN 0-521-36825-1
- Lee, Stephen J. (2000), European Dictatorships, 1918–1945, New York: Routledge, ISBN 0-415-23046-2
- Miranda, Salvador (1998), "Schuster, O.S.B., Alfredo Ildefonso", The Cardinals of the Holy Roman Church, Florida International University Libraries, archived from the original on 4 January 2014
- Terry, Jones (11 August 2010), "Blessed Alfredo Ildefonso Schuster", The Patron Saints Index
- Harris, Judith (2007), Pompeii Awakened: A Story of Rediscovery, New York: I.B.Tauris & Co Ltd, ISBN 978-1-84511-241-7
- Leccisotti, T. (1969), Il cardinale Schuster, S. Benedetto, Milan. (in Italian)
- Nobili, E. (2005), La parabola di un'illusione. Il cardinale Schuster dalla guerra d'Etiopia alle leggi razziali, NED, Milan. (in Italian)

Catholic Church titles
Preceded by Antoine Delpuch	Rector of the Pontifical Oriental Institute; 7 October 1919 – 4 July 1922	Succeeded by Michel-Joseph Bourguignon d'Herbigny
Preceded by Eugenio Tosi	Archbishop of Milan; 26 June 1929 – 30 August 1954	Succeeded by Giovanni Battista Montini
Preceded by Eugenio Tosi	Cardinal-Priest of Santi Silvestro e Martino ai Monti; 18 July 1929 – 30 August 1954	Succeeded by Giovanni Battista Montini
