= Matteo Piccione =

Italian painter

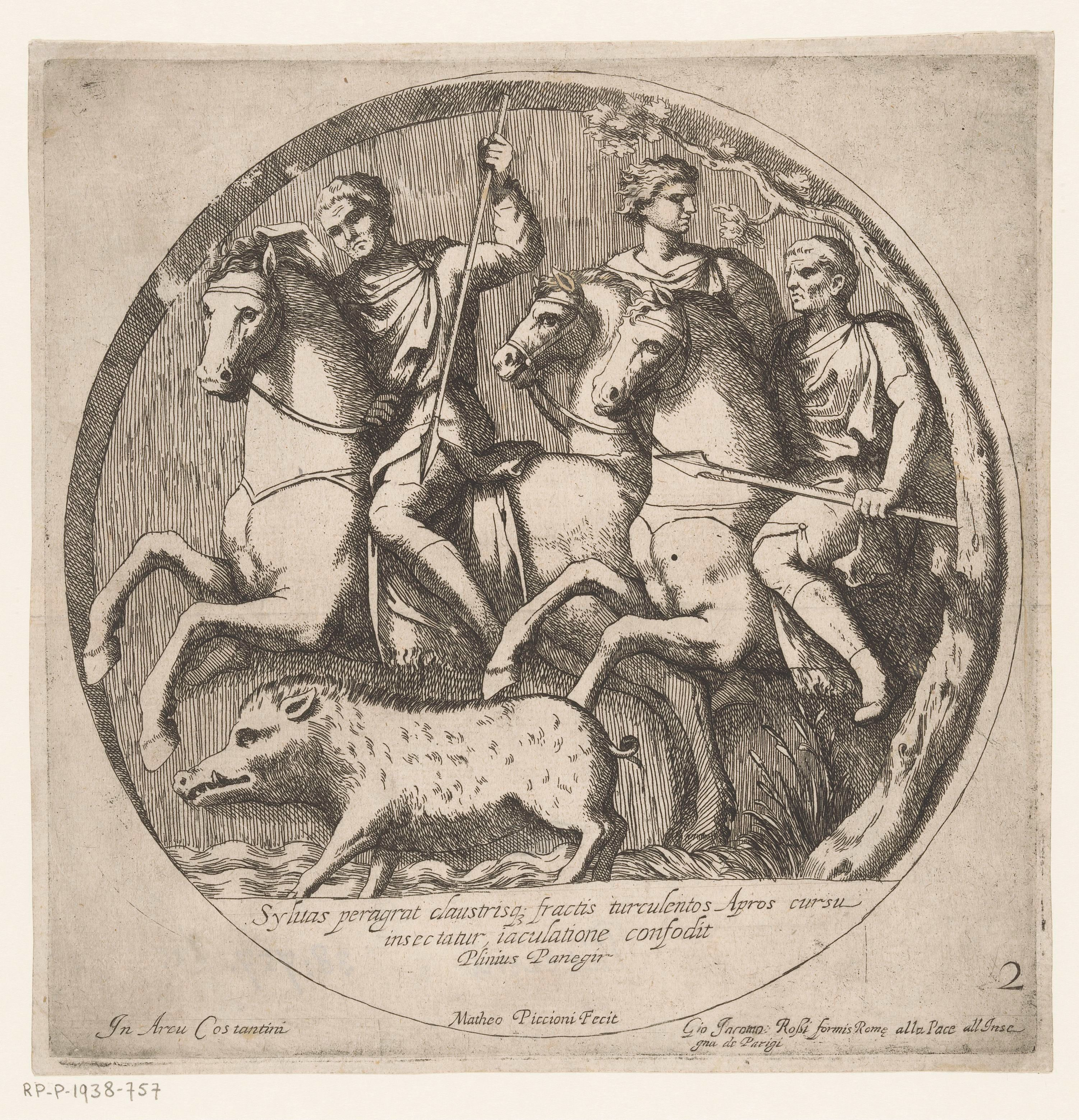
Print by Matteo Piccione

Matteo Piccione (1615 – 1671) was an Italian painter, active in Rome, as a painter of religious subjects. He was born in Ancona. He is noted by Lanzi to be a collaborator with Giovanni Antonio Galli He was an academic in the Accademia di San Luca in 1655. One of his paintings is in San Martino ai Monti, Rome. Mariette's catalogue lists paintings in the style of Veronese and Cesi.
