= Domenico de' Rossi =

Italian printer (1659–1730)

- Piazza Navona. Engraving by Domenico de' Rossi, Metropolitan Museum of Art, New York
- Born: 1647; Lucca, Republic of Lucca
- Died: 3/4 February 1730; Rome, Papal States
- Known for: Printmaking
- Movement: Baroque
- Father: Giovanni Giacomo de' Rossi

Domenico de' Rossi (1647 – 3/4 February 1730) was an Italian printer, active in Rome from 1691 to about 1724.

== Biography ==
Son of Giovanni Giacomo de' Rossi, in 1691, upon his father's death, Domenico inherited his father's print shop near the church of Santa Maria della Pace, one of the largest and most long-lived of Baroque Rome. Several generations of the de' Rossi participated in the family publishing firm established in the 17th century, which continued to produce engravings for the use of designers.

== Publications ==
De' Rossi is especially remembered for the three folio volumes of architectural engravings of elevations and frontal views of Baroque palazzi and churches in Rome, which included among them some unexecuted designs of Bernini and Borromini, and which were titled Studio d'architettura civile di Roma 1702, 1711, and 1721. The first volume, showing a wide variety of designs of windows, doors and gates, porticos and porches, chimney pieces and stairs, and dedicated to Pope Clement XI, was engraved for de' Rossi by quite a large team: Alessandro Specchi, Filippo Vasconi, Carlo Fontana, Vincenzo Franceschini, and others. De' Rossi also produced a book of designs for altars and chapels, Disegni di Vari Altari e Cappelle, 1685. The series of engravings were some of the first to present the contemporary Baroque decoration of 17th-century Rome; thus they are of interest to architectural historians and were reprinted with an introductory essay by Anthony Blunt, 1972.

When he published a collection of engravings of ancient and modern Roman sculpture, Raccolta di statue antiche e moderne (Rome, 1704), he turned to the well-known antiquarian Paolo Alessandro Maffei for suitably learned descriptive text, for what was in effect the first eighteenth-century art book, whose refined engravings by French artists were designed to appeal to the cognoscenti.

== Works ==
- Studio d'architettura civile sopra gli ornamenti di porte e finestre tatti da alcune fabbriche insigni di Roma con le misure piante modini, e profili. Opera de piu celebri architetti de nostri tempi, Rome, 1702. Dedicated to Clement XI
- Studio d'architettura civile sopra varj ornamenti di cappelle, e diversi sepolcri tratti da più chiese di Roma colle loro facciate, fianchi, piante, e misure. Opera de' più celebri architetti de' nostri tempi, Rome, 1711. Dedicated to Cardinal Francesco Acquaviva d'Aragona
- Studio d'architettura civile sopra varie chiese, cappelle di Roma, e palazzo di Caprarola, et altre fabriche con le loro facciate, spaccati, piante, e misure. Opera de' piu celebri architetti de' nostri tempi, Rome, 1721. Dedicated to Cardinal Bernardino Scotto.
