= Abraham Meets Melchizedek =

Painting by Giovanni Benedetto Castiglione

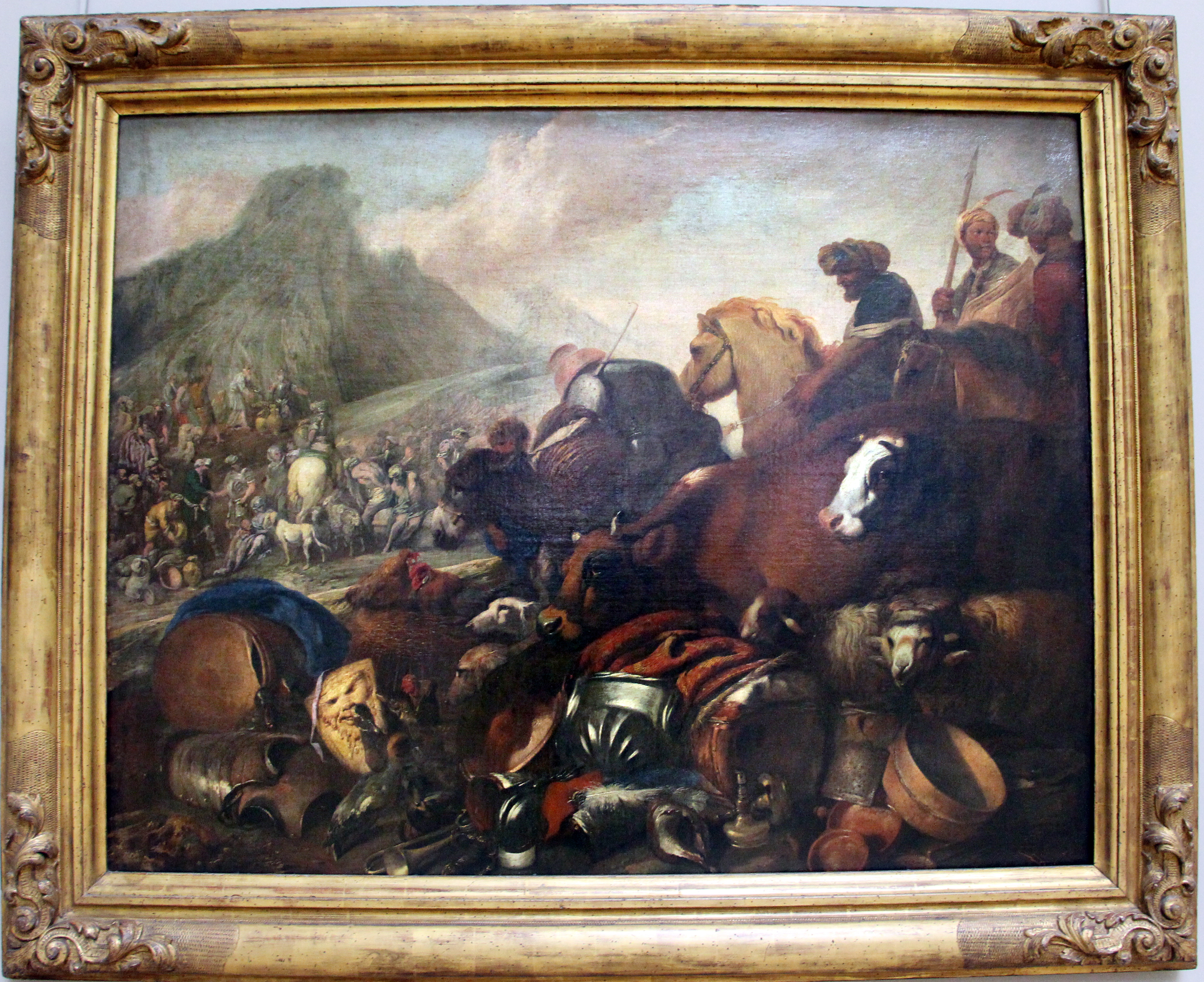
Abraham Meets Melchizedek (c. 1650) by Giovanni Benedetto Castiglione

Abraham Meets Melchizedek or The Meeting Between Abraham and Melchizedek is an oil on canvas painting by Giovanni Benedetto Castiglione, from c. 1650. it is held in the Louvre, in Paris.

In the left background is a scene from Genesis 14: 1-24, whilst the foreground is taken up by a still life. It is signed on a rock at bottom left "Castilionus/Cap XVI".

It entered the French royal collection under Louis XV sometime before 1753 (at which date it was recorded as being at the château de Marly and misattributed to Berchem). It was exhibited at France's Musée central des Arts from 1801 and is now in the Louvre Museum in Paris. It was exhibited in the "Accumulation, échange, marché, pillage" section of the Louvre exhibition Les Choses. Une histoire de la nature morte from 12 October 2022 to 23 January 2023.
