= Eugenio Tosi =

Italian cardinal

His Eminence Eugenio Tosi O.Ss.C.A.
- Cardinal; Archbishop of Milan
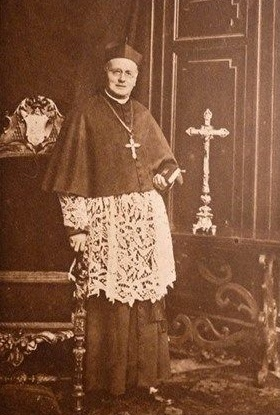
- Church: Roman Catholic Church
- Archdiocese: Milan
- See: Milan
- Appointed: 7 March 1922
- Installed: 16 July 1922
- Term ended: 7 January 1929
- Predecessor: Achille Ratti
- Successor: Alfredo Ildefonso Schuster
- Other post: Cardinal-Priest of Santi Silvestro e Martino ai Monti (1922-1929)
- Previous posts: Vicar General of Rimini (1909-1911); Bishop of Squillace (1911-1917); Apostolic Administrator of Squillace (1917-1918); Bishop of Andria (1917-1922)

Orders
- Ordination: 24 June 1887
- Consecration: 16 April 1911 by Andrea Carlo Ferrari
- Created cardinal: 11 December 1922 by Pope Pius XI
- Rank: Cardinal-Priest

Personal details
- Born: 6 May 1864 Busto Arsizio, Kingdom of Italy
- Died: 7 January 1929 (aged 64) Milan, Kingdom of Italy
- Buried: Cathedral of Milan
- Motto: Ora et labora ("Pray and work")
- Coat of arms

Eugenio Tosi (6 May 1864 – 7 January 1929) was an Italian cardinal of the Catholic Church. He served as Archbishop of Milan from 1922 until his death, and was elevated to the cardinalate in 1922.

== Biography ==
=== Early life ===
Tosi was born in Busto Arsizio, the son of Luigi Tosi and Teresa Rabolini, and studied at the seminaries of Monza and Milan. Ordained to the priesthood on 4 June 1887, he entered the Oblates of Saints Ambrose and Charles in 1889, after serving as a curate in Busto. Tosi then taught at the Missionary House of the Oblates in Rho until 1909, when he was made vicar general of Rimini.

On 5 April 1911, Tosi was appointed Bishop of Squillace by Pope Pius X. He received his episcopal consecration on the following 16 April from Andrea Cardinal Ferrari. After becoming Bishop of Andria on 22 March 1917, he served as apostolic administrator of Squillace from 10 August 1917 to February 1918.

=== Cardinal Archbishop of Milan ===
Pope Pius XI named Tosi to succeed him as Archbishop of Milan on 7 March 1922 and created him Cardinal-Priest of Ss. Silvestro e Martino ai Monti in the consistory of 11 December the same year. He publicly denounced the playing of the opera The Martyrdom of San Sebastian, which Catholics were prohibited from seeing, at La Scala in 1926.

=== Death ===
Cardinal Tosi died after a long illness in Milan, at age 64. He is buried before the altar of the Virgo potens in the Milan Cathedral.

== Bibliography ==
- Panizza, Mario (1998). Card. Eugenio Tosi, Arcivescovo Di Milano: 1922-1929 (in Italian). Milano: NED. ISBN 978-88-7023-253-0.

Catholic Church titles
Preceded by Raffaele Morisciano	Bishop of Squillace; 1911–1917	Succeeded by Giorgio Elli
Preceded by Giuseppe Staiti di Brancaleone	Bishop of Andria; 1917–1922	Succeeded by Alessandro Macchi
Preceded by Ambrogio Damiano Achille Ratti	Archbishop of Milan; 1922–1929	Succeeded by Alfredo Schuster, OSB
