= Giovanni Benedetto Castiglione =

Italian Baroque artist

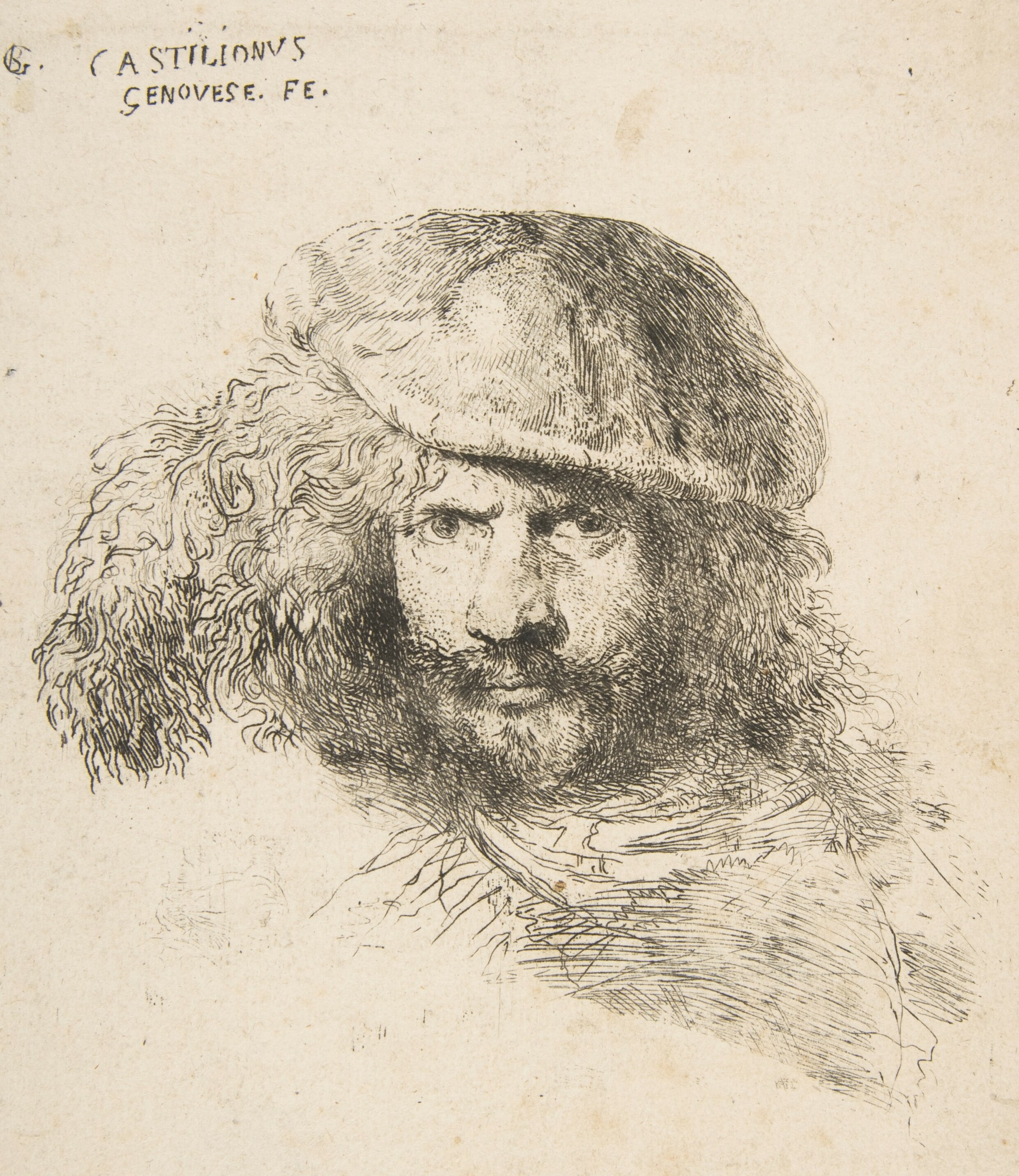
- Possible self-portrait, etching.
- Born: 1609; Genoa, Republic of Genoa
- Died: 1664 (aged 54–55); Mantua, Duchy of Mantua
- Known for: Painting and printmaking
- Movement: Baroque

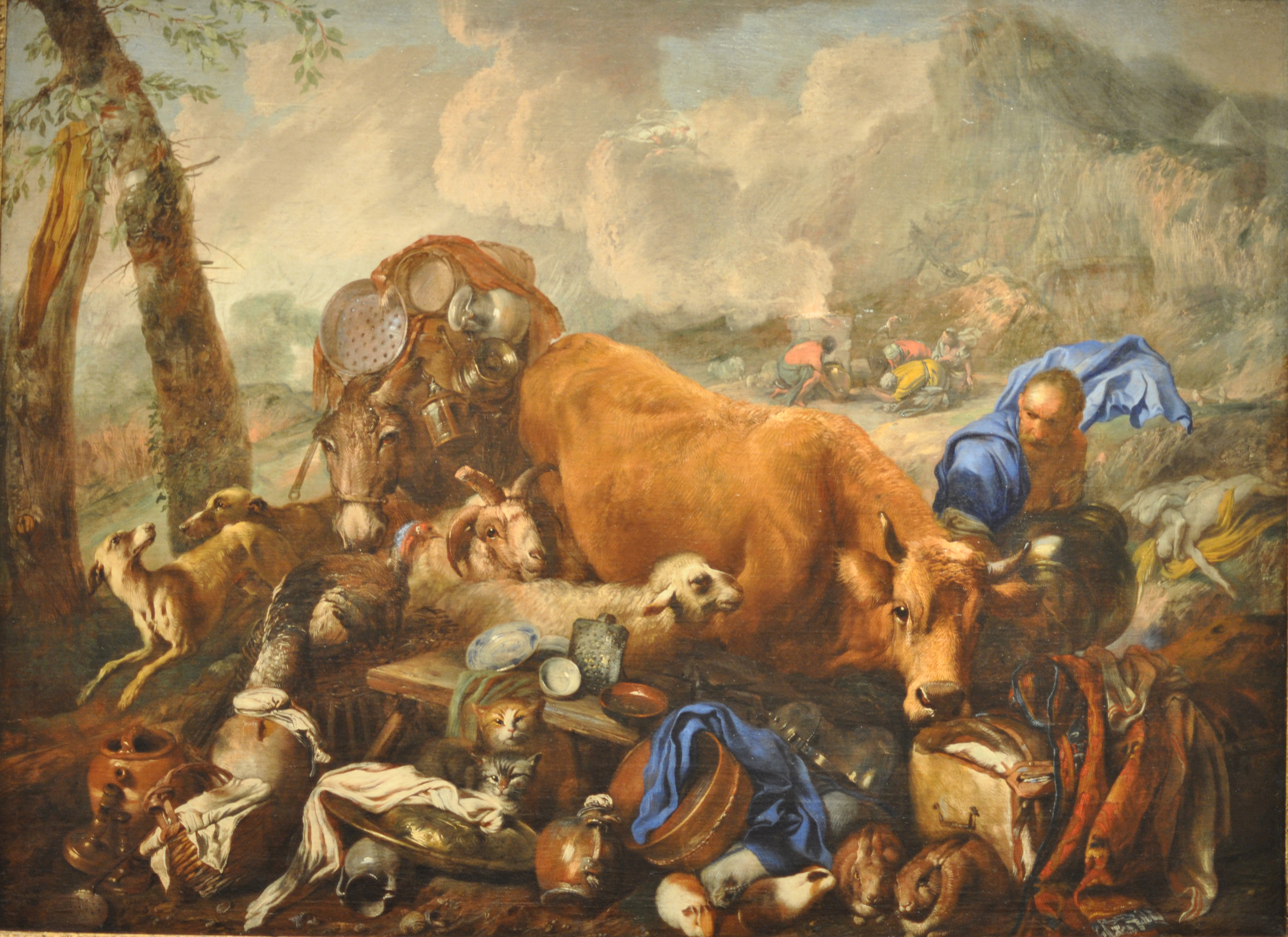
Noah's Sacrifice after the Deluge

Giovanni Benedetto Castiglione (baptized 23 March 1609 – 5 May 1664) was an Italian Baroque painter, printmaker and draftsman, of the Genoese school. He is best known now for his etchings, and as the inventor of the printmaking technique of monotyping. He was known as Il Grechetto in Italy and in France as Le Benédette.

He painted portraits, history paintings and landscapes, but came to specialize in rural scenes with more animals than human figures. Noah's Ark and the animals entering the Ark was a favourite subject of his, and he devised a number of other new subjects from the early parts of the Old Testament with the patriarchs and their animals.

== Biography ==
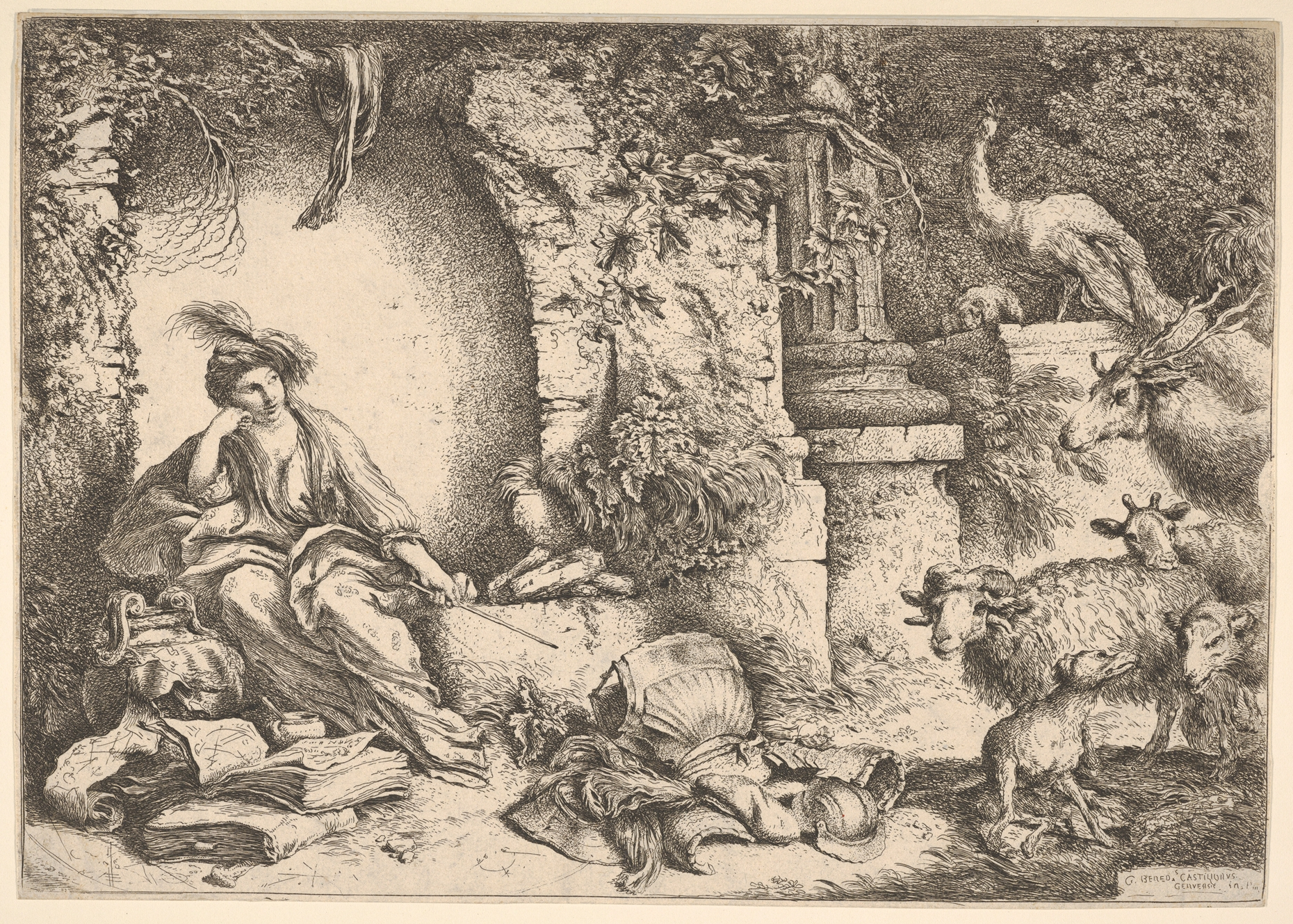
Circe changing the companions of Ulysses into beasts, etching, 1650–51

Castiglione was born in Genoa. The biographer of Genoese painters, Raffaele Soprani says his parents had him placed in the studio of Giovanni Battista Paggi. Wittkower describes him as a "passionate student" of Anthony van Dyck, who arrived in 1621, and Peter Paul Rubens, who stayed in the city in the first decade of the 17th century and whose paintings were readily accessible there. He may have trained under the Genoese Bernardo Strozzi. He lived in Rome from 1634 to about 1645, then returned to Genoa. He also traveled to Florence and Naples. He was back in Rome in 1647, before moving in 1651 to be a court artist in Mantua for Duke Carlo II and his wife Isabella Chiara de Austria. He died in Mantua.

He had various brushes with the law in his lifetime. The Queen's Gallery in London, where an exhibition of his work was held in 2013, made the following statement: "Giovanni Benedetto Castiglione was also a violent and impetuous man, who was repeatedly in court for assault, allegedly attempted to throw his sister off a roof and was forced to leave Rome, probably after committing murder. The turbulence that characterised his life overshadowed his artistic brilliance, and Castiglione struggled to achieve recognition in his lifetime. Much of what is known about the artist is derived not from fulfilled commissions, but from court documents."

== Works ==
Castiglione was a brilliant draftsman and pioneered the development of the oil sketch (often using a mixture of mediums) as a finished work – previously they had been used only for working studies for another finished piece, for example by Rubens. He returned to the same subjects over and over again, as both paintings and etchings, but with significantly different compositions each time.

He also executed some sixty etchings, arguably the most famous of which is The Genius of Castiglione, published by Giovanni Giacomo de Rossi in 1648. Diogenes searching for a Man is another of the principal of these; others are about religious themes. Some are moralistic stories such as that of the blind leading the blind. The etchings are remarkable for light and shade, and have even earned for Castiglione the name of a second Rembrandt. He was exposed to Rembrandt's etching by 1630.

In about 1648 he invented the monotype, the only printmaking technique to be an Italian invention, making over twenty over the succeeding years. His most popular and influential prints were a series of exotic heads, mostly of vaguely Oriental males, but also of women. These were produced in great numbers. Among the subjects of his etchings are Diogenes with his lantern, Noah leading animals into Arc, St Joseph Asleep during Flight from Egypt, Circe surrounded by animals, Silenus at the fountain, Nativity, Resurrection of Lazarus, and The Genius of Castiglione.

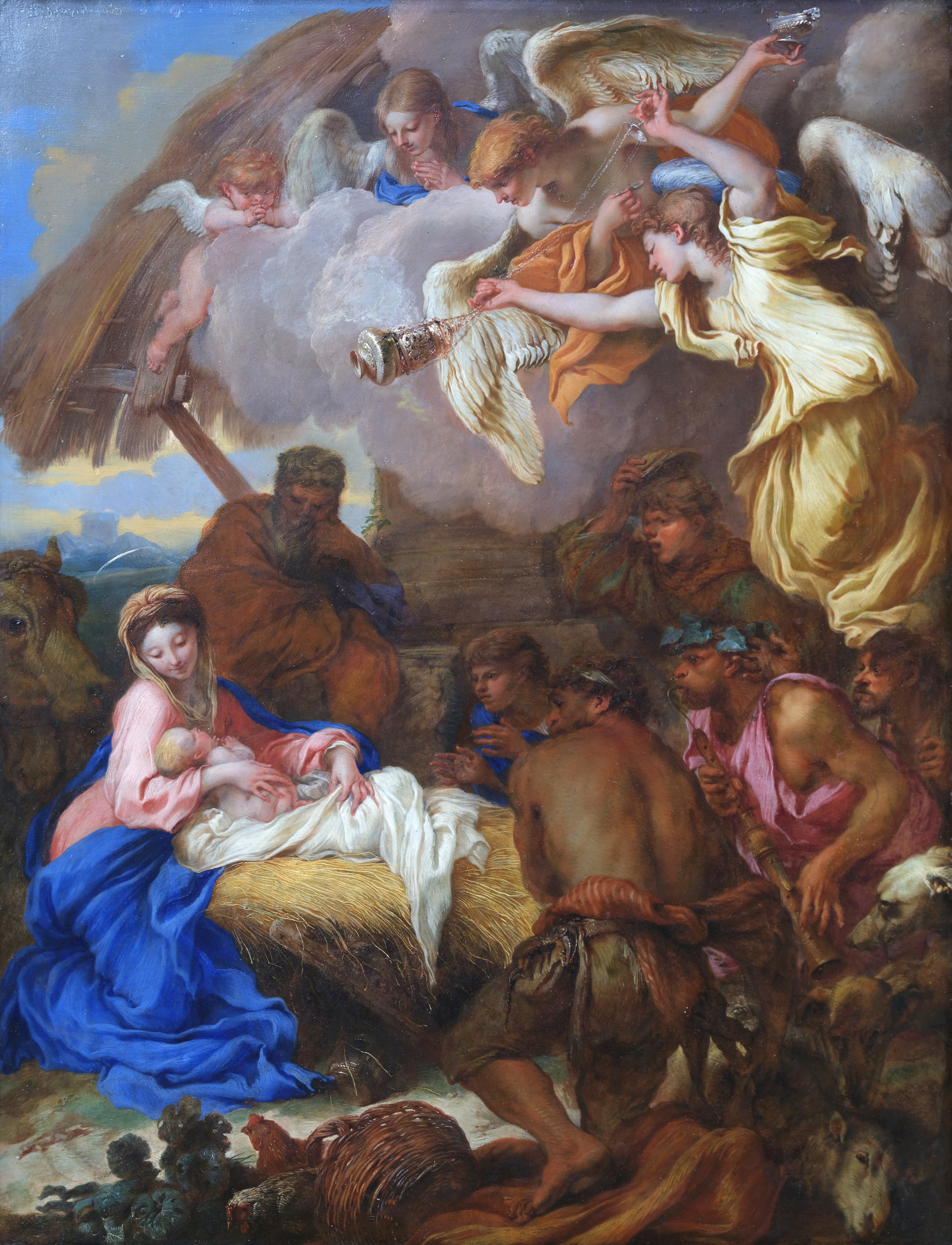
The Adoration of the Shepherds, Louvre

Castiglione was famous for his ability to paint animals, mostly farm animals, and they were often a dominant motif in his paintings. For example, in the painting of Jesus clearing the temple of Moneylenders, the religious event is a minor, background part of the painting, the stampede of animals is far more prominent than the scattering of bankers. Castiglione's attention to detail in the depiction of nature is regarded as proof of the influence of Scorza and the Flemish still life and animal painter Jan Roos who was a long-term resident of Genoa. It has been suggested that it was Jan Roos who convinced Castiglione to enliven his religious and mythological compositions with animal and still-life elements.

In Mantua, he received his name of Grechetto, from the classic air of his pastoral depictions. In his later years, he was severely afflicted by gout. His brother Salvatore and his son Francesco excelled in the same subjects; and it is thought that many paintings which are ascribed to Benedetto are only copies after him, or perhaps originals by his son or brother. He also influenced Anton Maria Vassallo (c1640-60). Among those who engraved after him were Giovanni Lorenzo Bertolotto in Genoa, the Venetian Anton Maria Zanetti, Michele l'Asne, Louis de Chatillon, and Coreneille Coemans.

His paintings are to be found in Rome, Venice, Naples, Florence, and more especially Genoa and Mantua. The Presepio (Nativity of Jesus) for the church of San Luca, Genoa, ranks among his most celebrated paintings, and the Louvre contains eight characteristic examples. He painted a SS. Mary Magdalene and Catharine for the church of the Madonna di Castello and St. James defeats the Moors for the Oratorio di San Giacomo della Marina, both in Genoa.

== Gallery ==
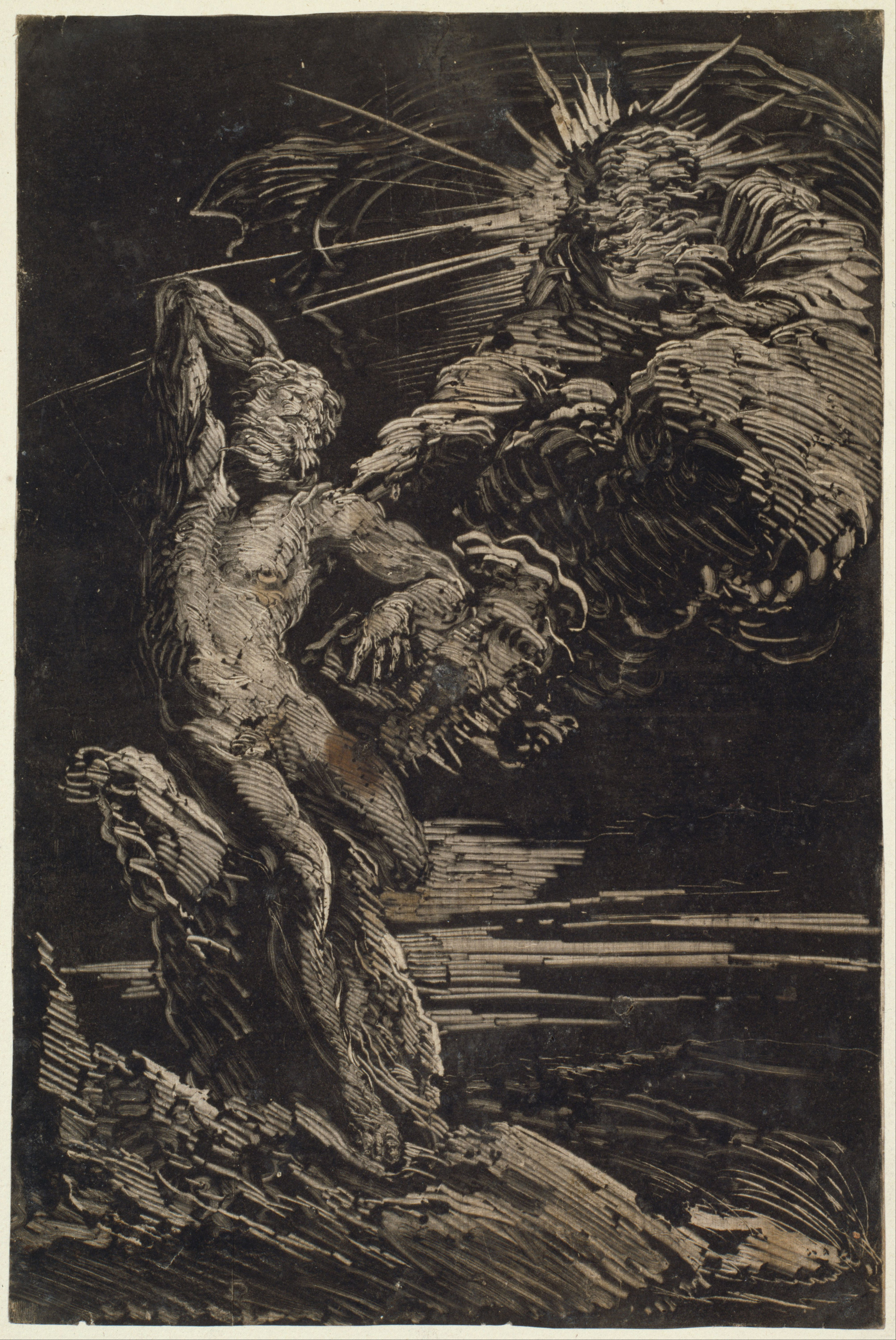
The Creation of Adam, monotype, c. 1642

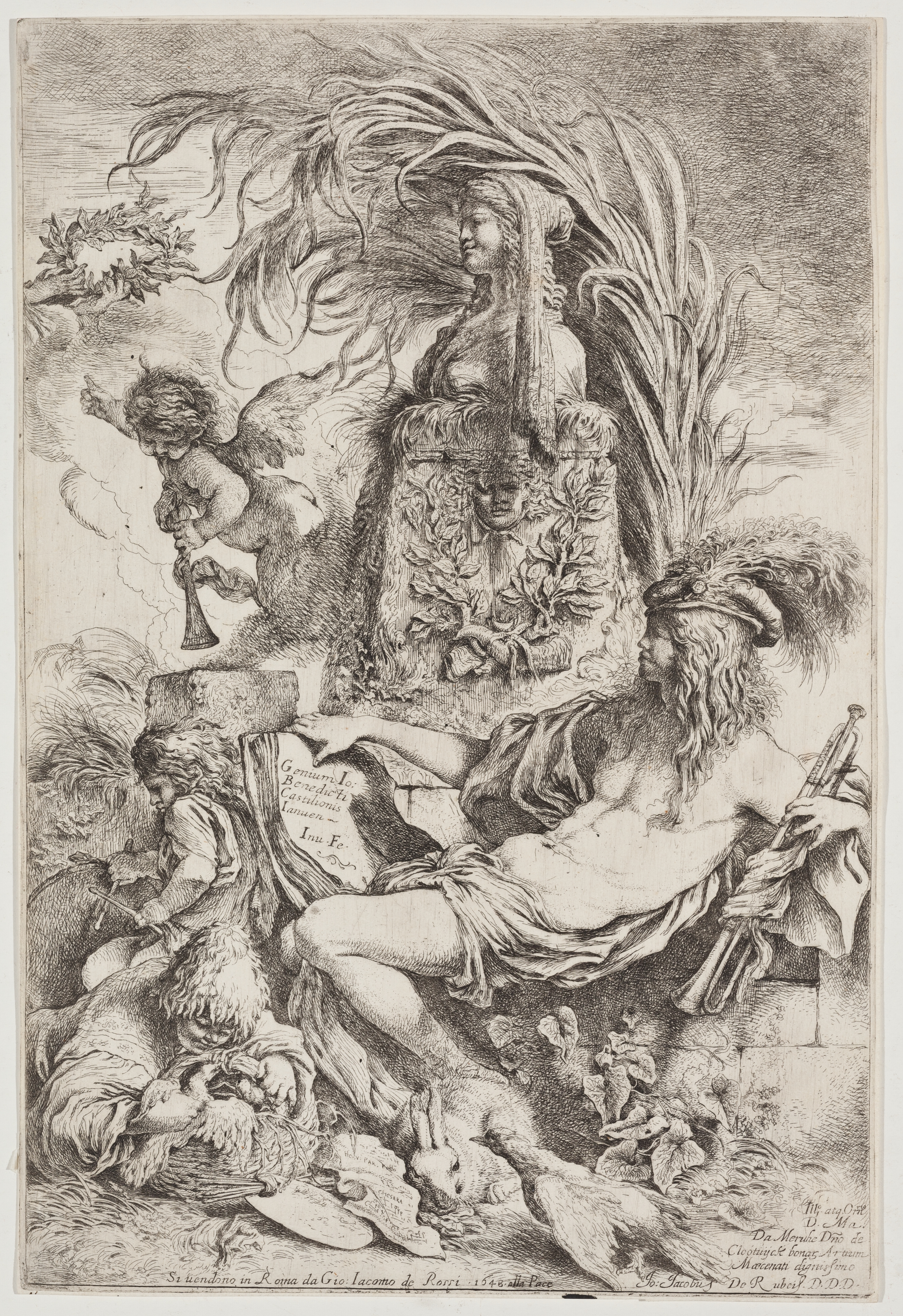
The Genius of Castiglione, etching, 1647–48

Abraham Meets Melchizidek, c.1650

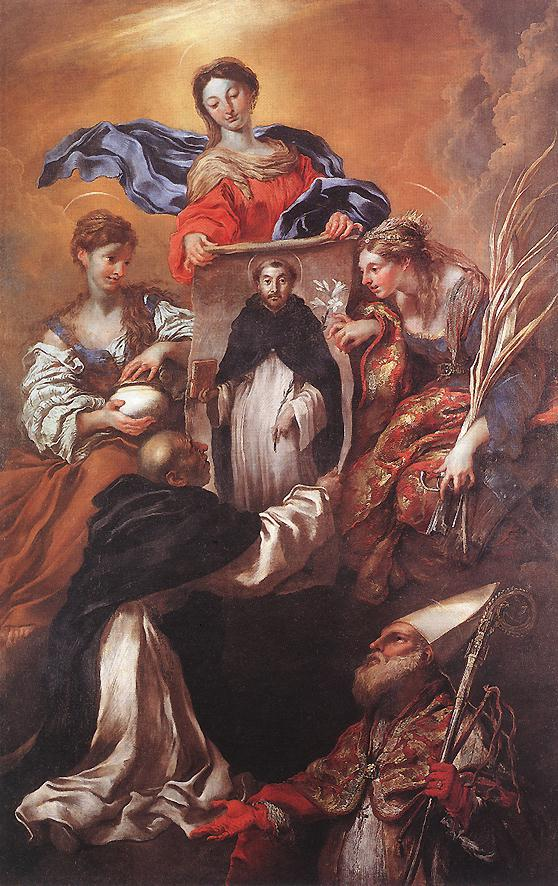
San Domenico in Soriano, c. 1655

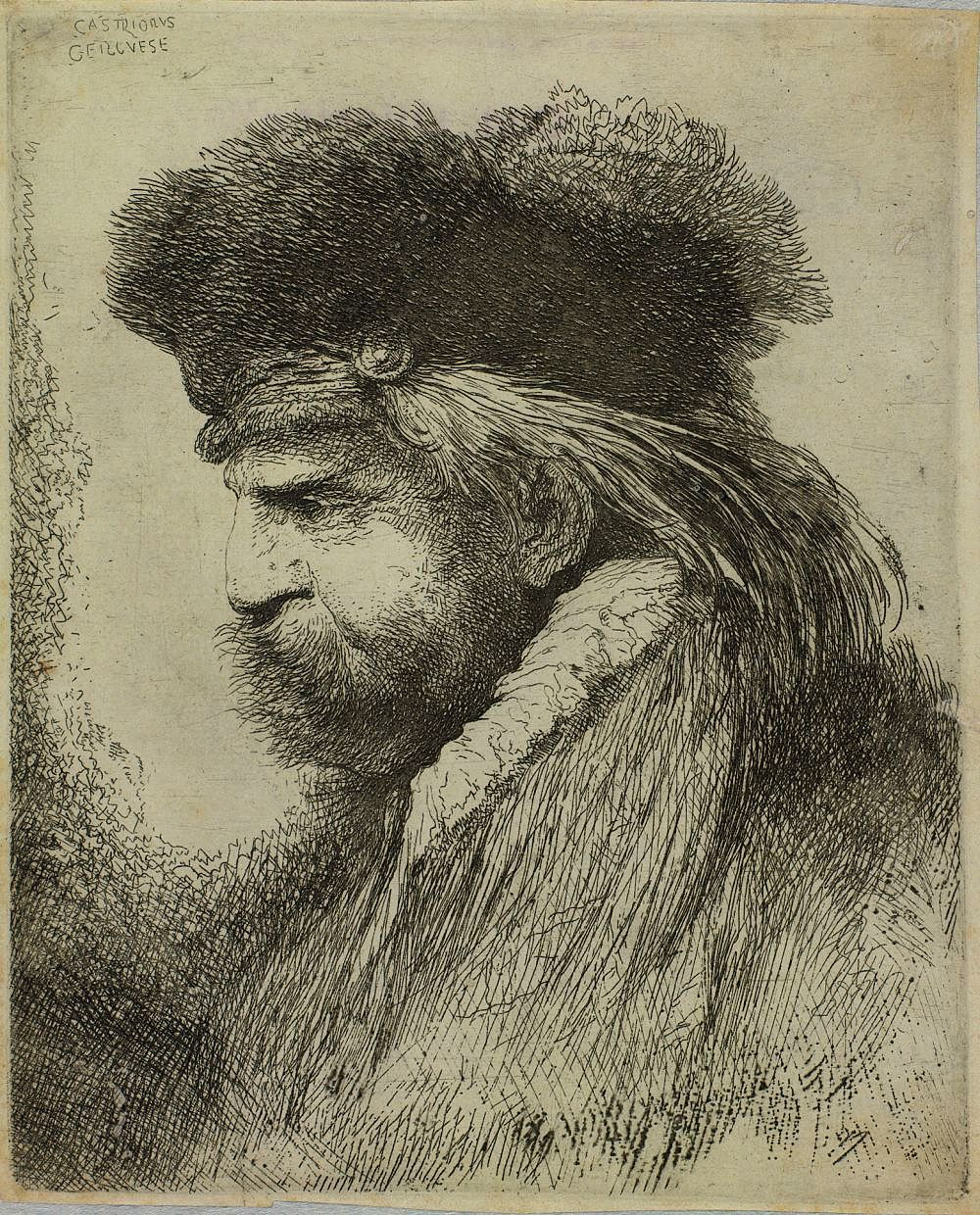
Head of a Man with an Oriental Turban, etching, c. 1640, one of a popular series of character heads
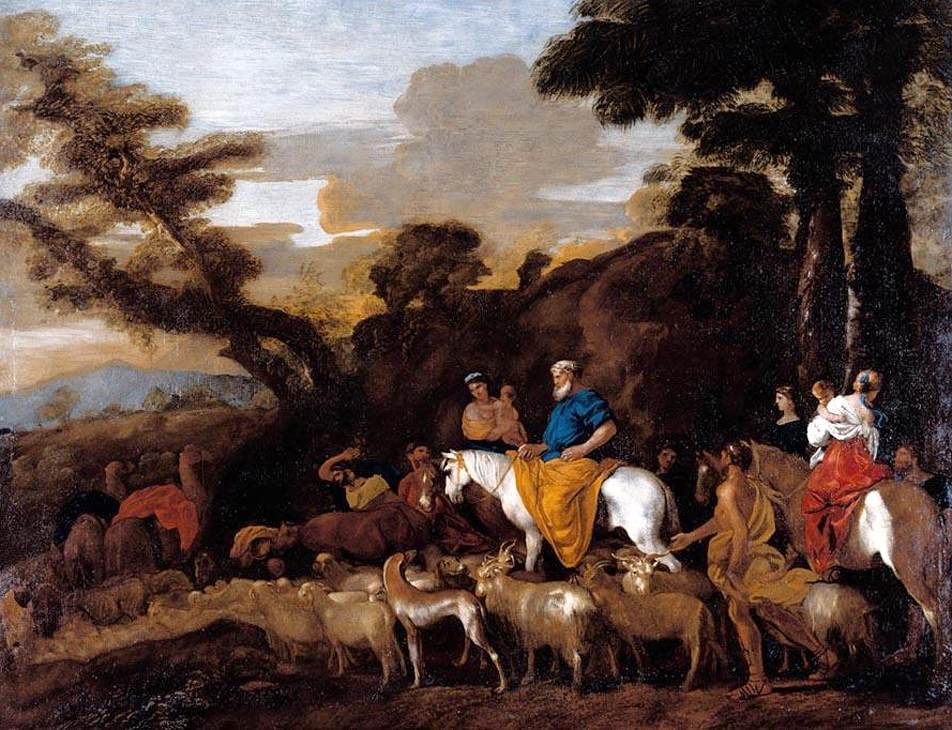
Jacob leading the Flocks of Laban

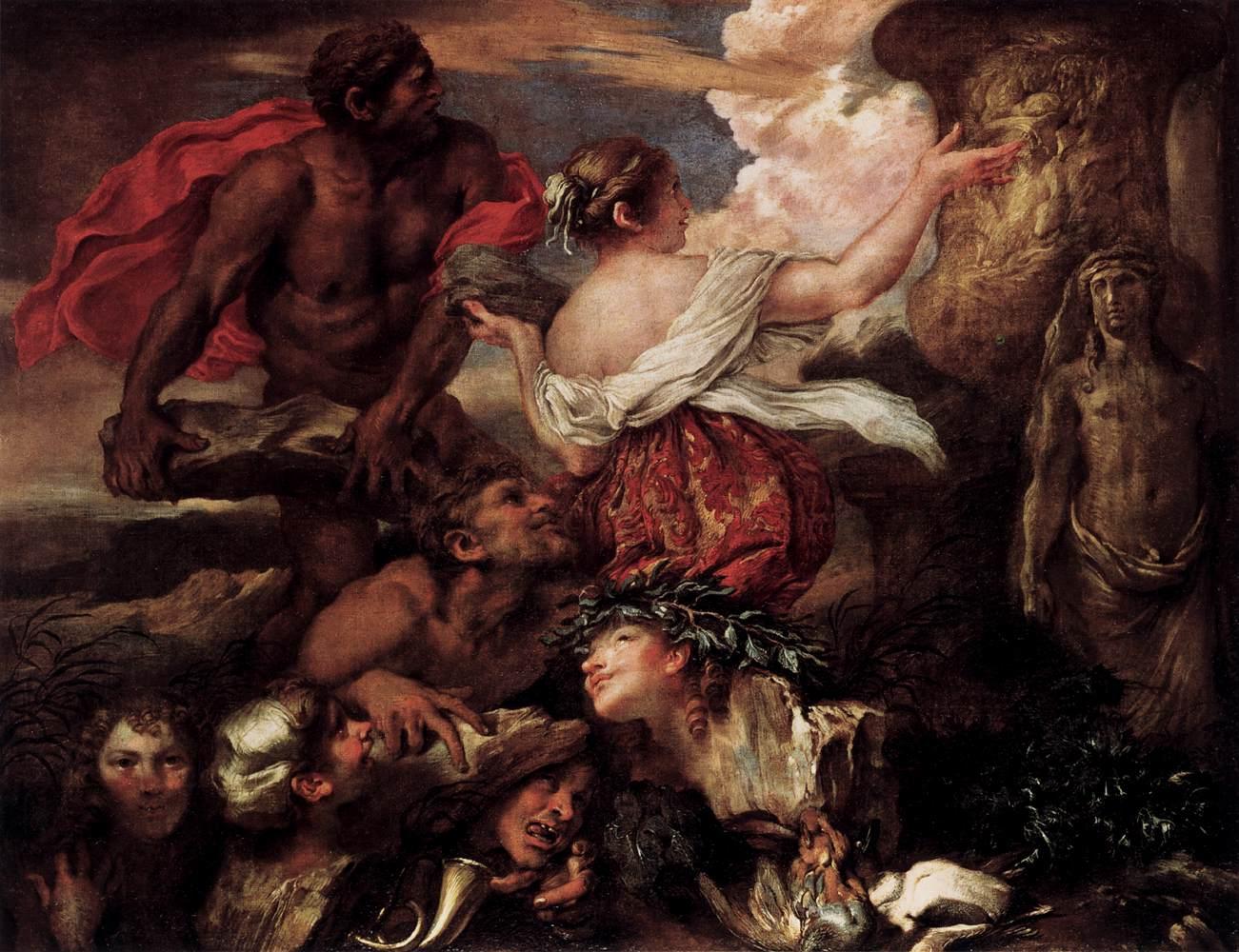
Pyrrha and Deucalion

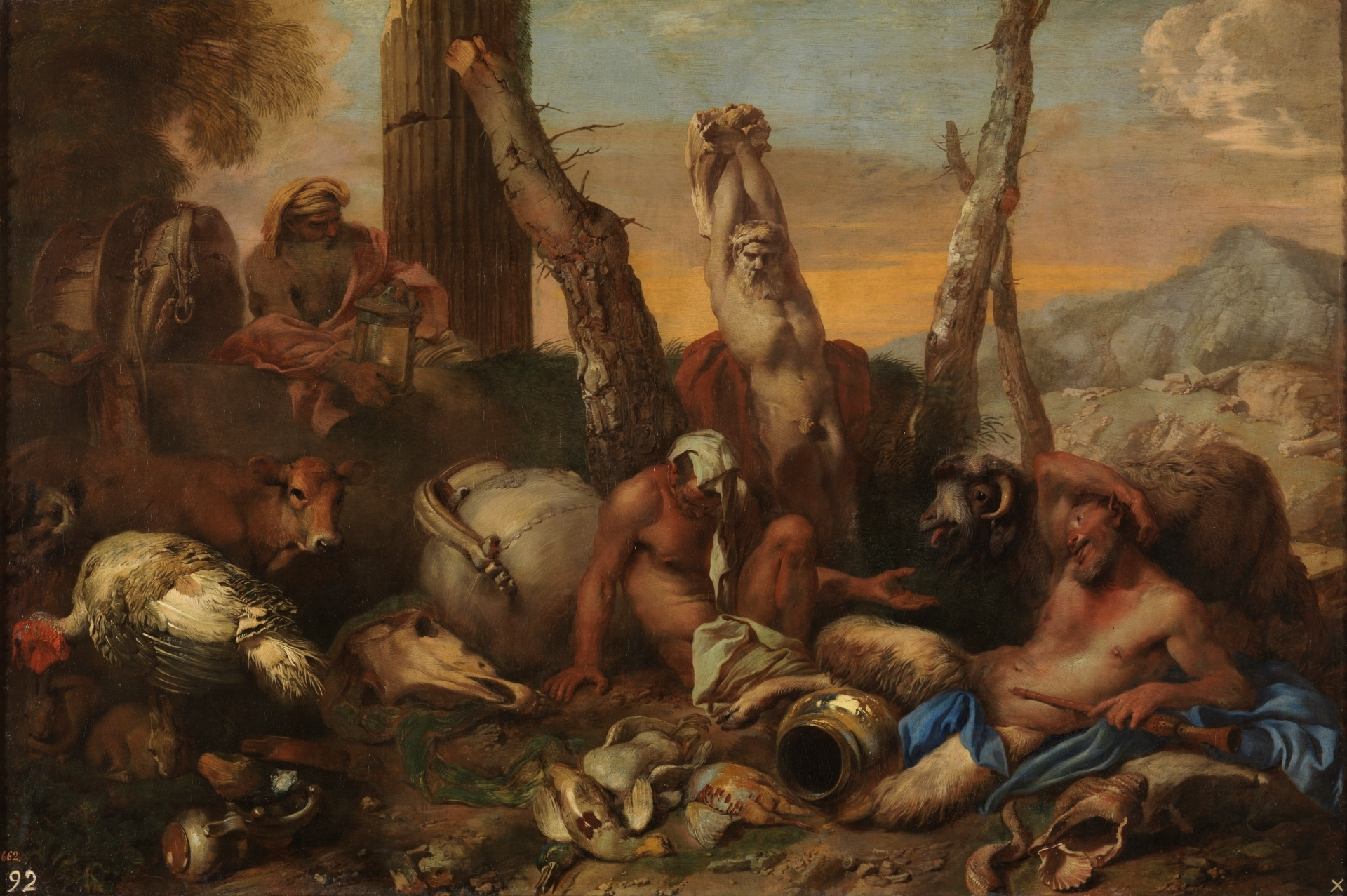
Diogenes, Museo del Prado

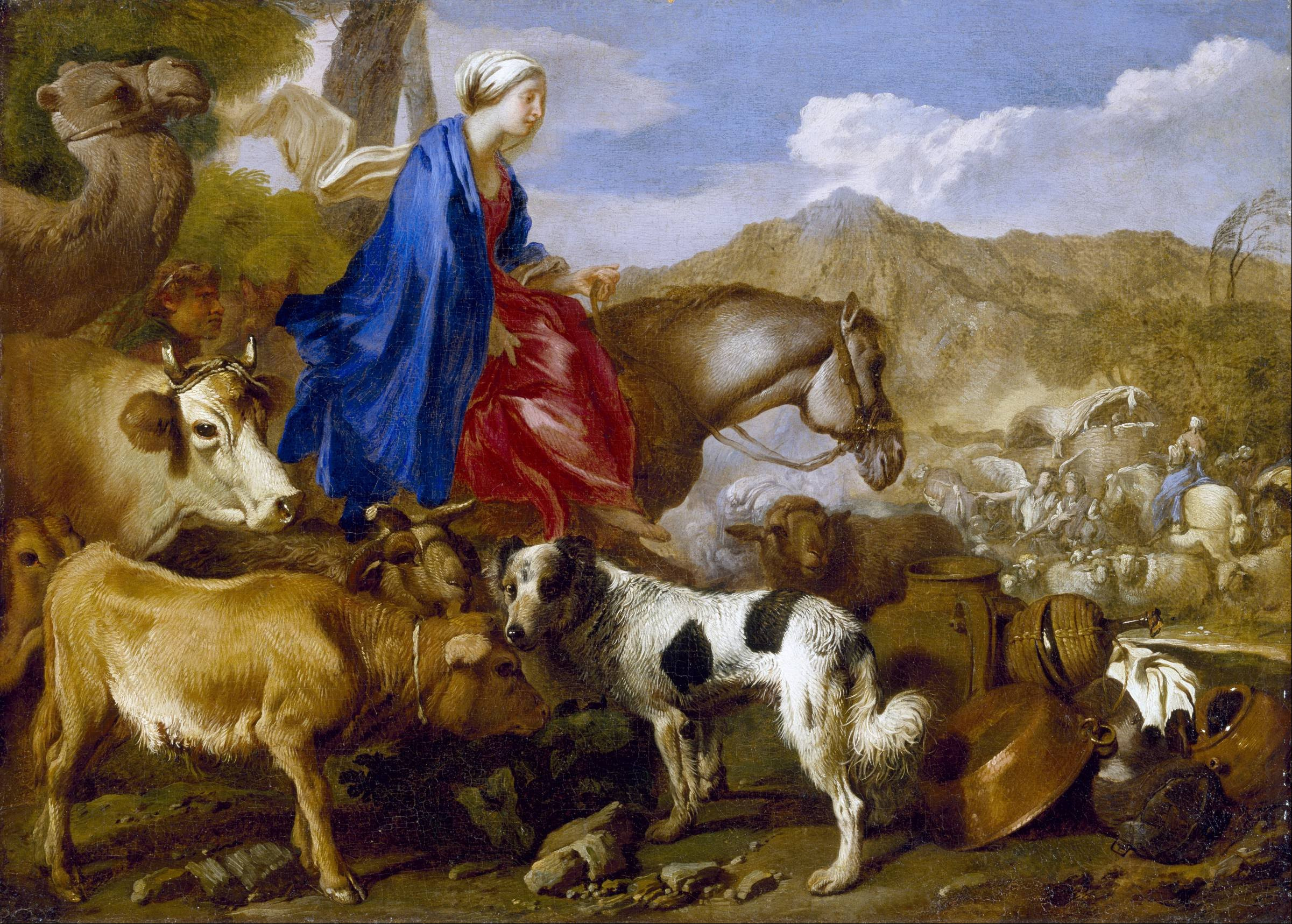
Journey of Rebecca

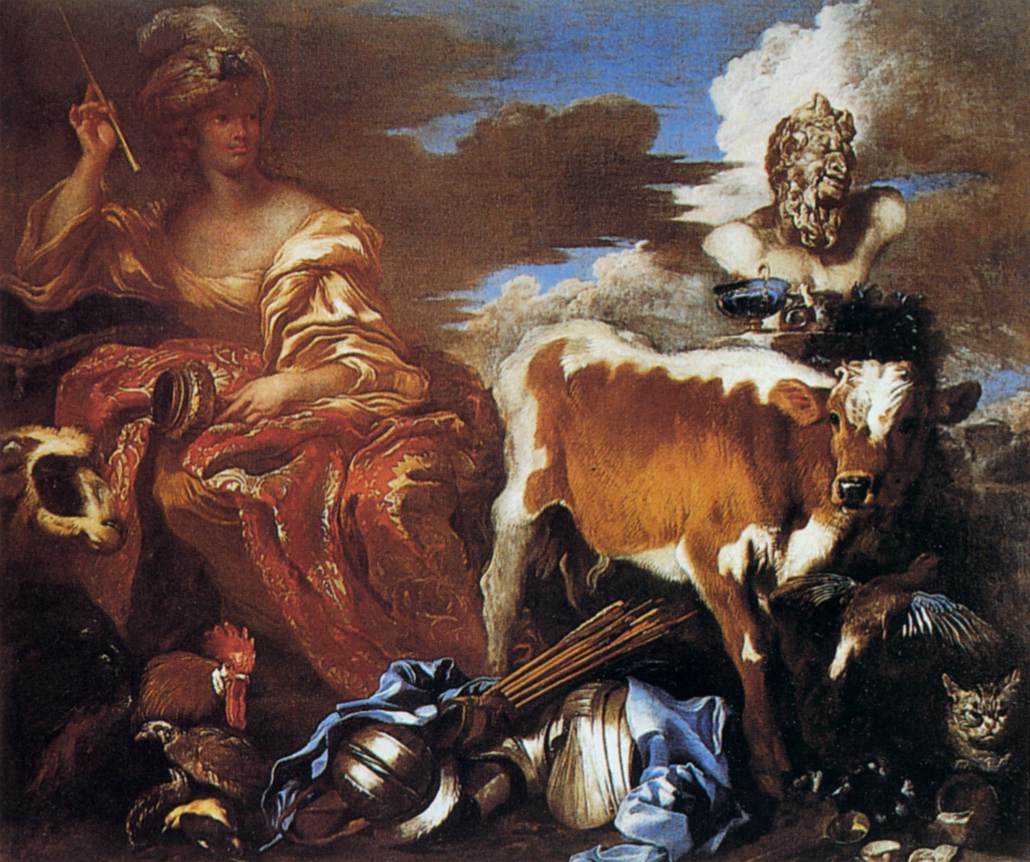
Circe

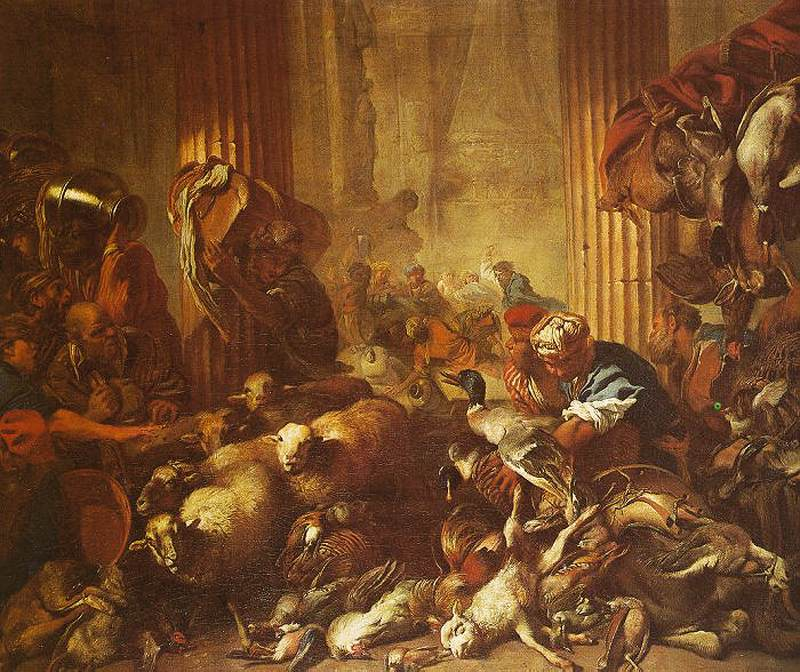
Christ Chasing the Moneylenders from the Temple, Louvre

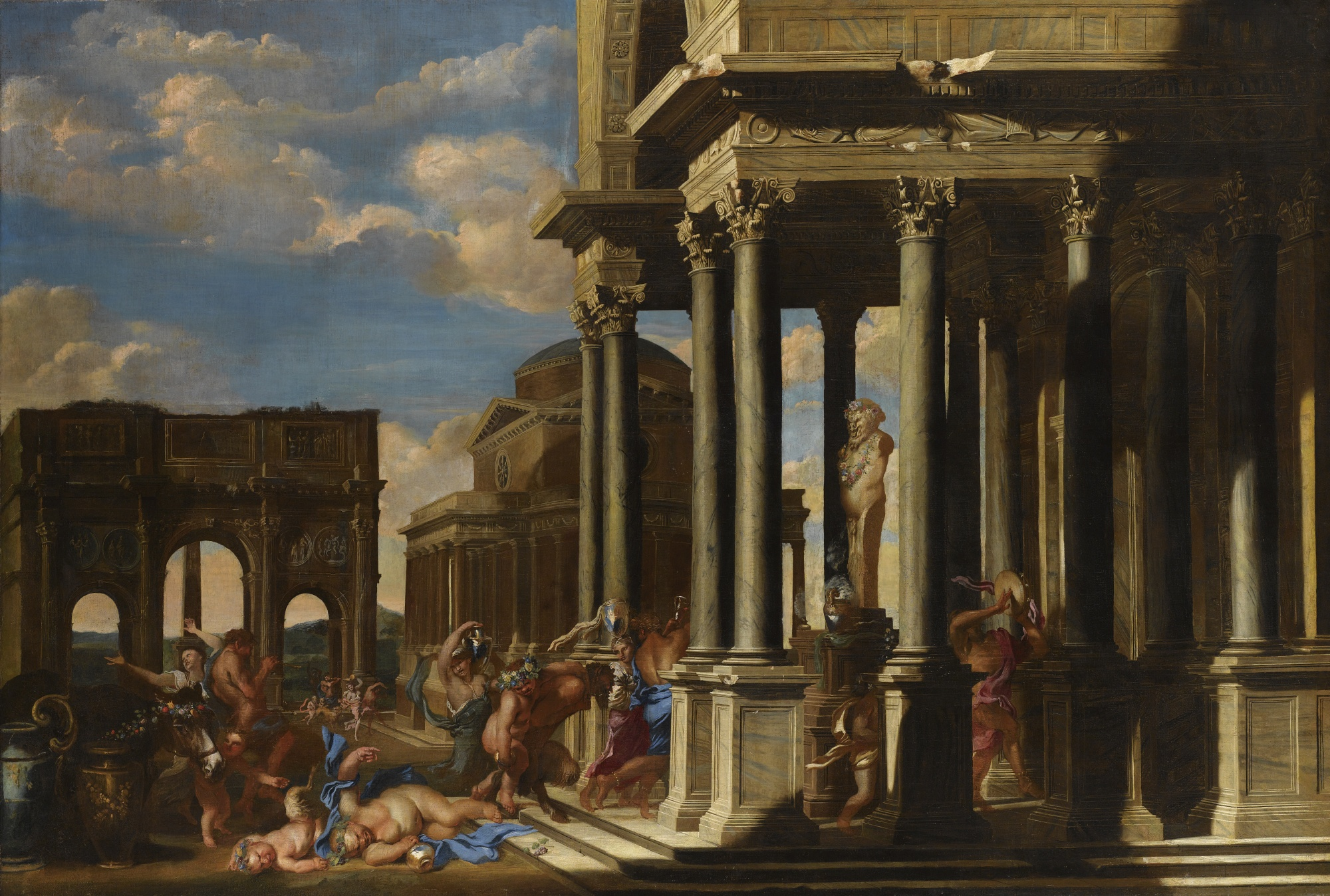
Architectural Capriccio with a Bacchanalian Procession, Filippo Gagliardi (architecture) and GB Castiglione (figures)

== Sources ==
- Standring, Timothy J.; Clayton, Martin (2013). Castiglione: Lost Genius (PDF). London: Royal Collection Trust. ISBN 978-1-905686-77-3. Archived from the original (PDF) on 2023-07-24.
- Wittkower, Rudolf (1993). Pelican History of Art, Art and Architecture Italy, 1600-1750. Penguin Books. pp. 353–355.
- Jeutter, E. (2004). Zur Problematik der Rembrandt-Rezeption im Werk des Genuesen Giovanni Benedetto Castiglione (Genua 1609-1664 Mantua): eine Untersuchung zu seinem Stil und seinen Nachwirkungen im 17. und 18. Jahrhundert (in German). VDG. ISBN 978-3-89739-466-7.
- Soprani, Raffaele; Ratti, Carlo Giuseppe (1768). Vite de' pittori, scultori ed architetti genovesi. Italica gens (in Italian). Forni. pp. 308–315.
