= Giovanni Giacomo de Rossi =

Italian printer and publisher of engravings

Giovanni Giacomo de Rossi or Latinized Ioannes Iacobus de Rubeis (1627–1691) was an Italian printer and publisher of engravings, active in Rome from 1648 to 1691.

== Biography ==
Giovanni Giacomo De Rossi was born in Rome in 1627. His father, Giuseppe de Rossi (1570–1639), was the founder of the most important and active printing press of the 17th century in Rome. The business began in 1633, and after Giuseppe, it passed to Giovanni Giacomo and to his brother Giandomenico (1619–1653).

Giovanni Giacomo de Rossi was the most involved of all the various family members who ran the press, and he worked between 1638 and 1691, and took the company to the height of its success. The artists that he printed the etchings for included Giovanni Benedetto Castiglione (1609–1665), Pietro Testa (1612–1650), Giovan Francesco Grimaldi (1606–1680) and Giovanni Battista Falda (1643–1678).

Upon his death, in 1691, the printing house was carried on by his son, Domenico de Rossi, and then by his nephew, Lorenzo Filippo (1682–?). In 1738 Clement XII bought the entire collection of prints, which constituted the initial nucleus of the Calcografia Camerale, today known as the Istituto Nazionale per la Grafica.

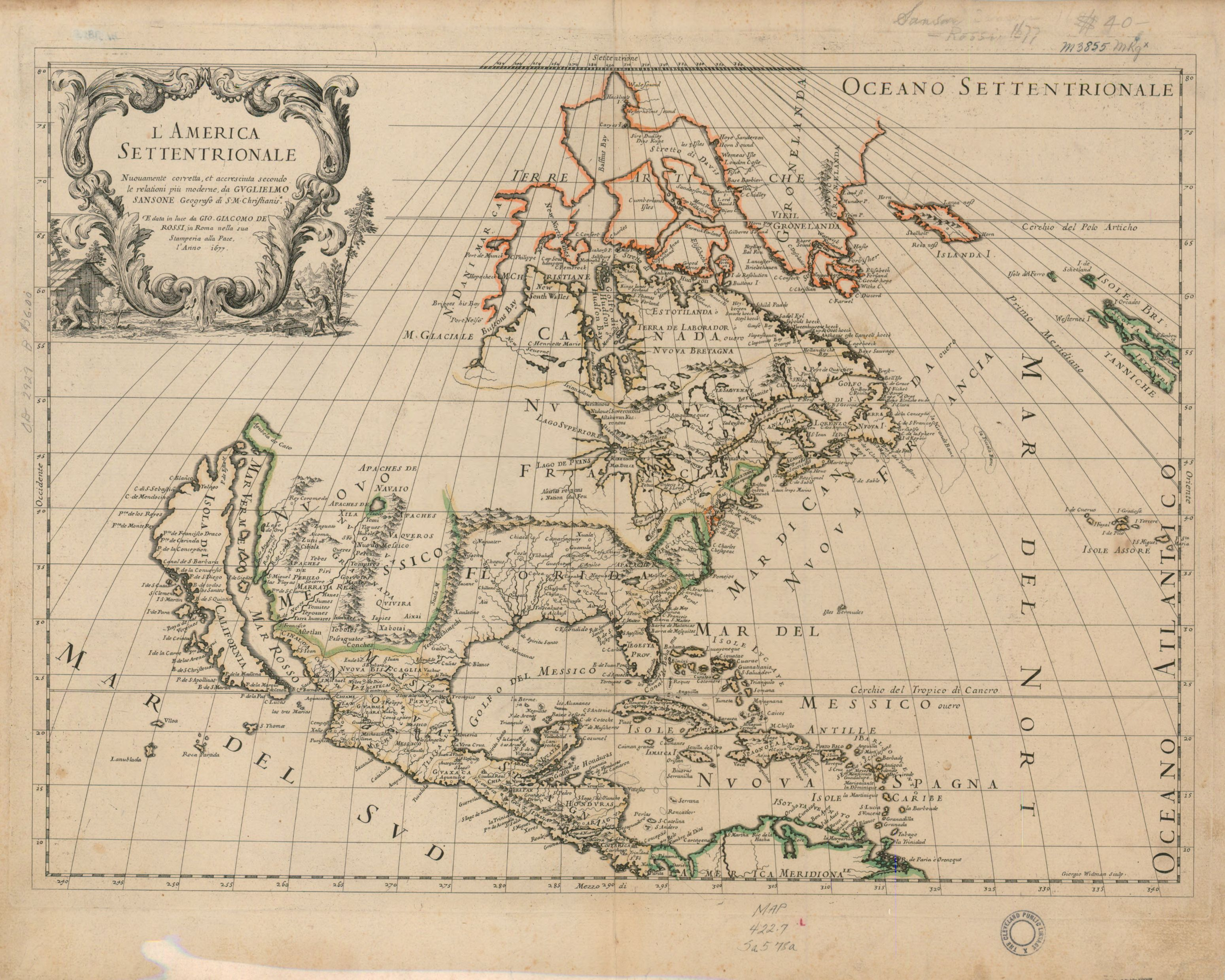
Map of North America, engraved by Giorgio Widman and printed by Gio. Giacomo de Rossi in Rome in 1677

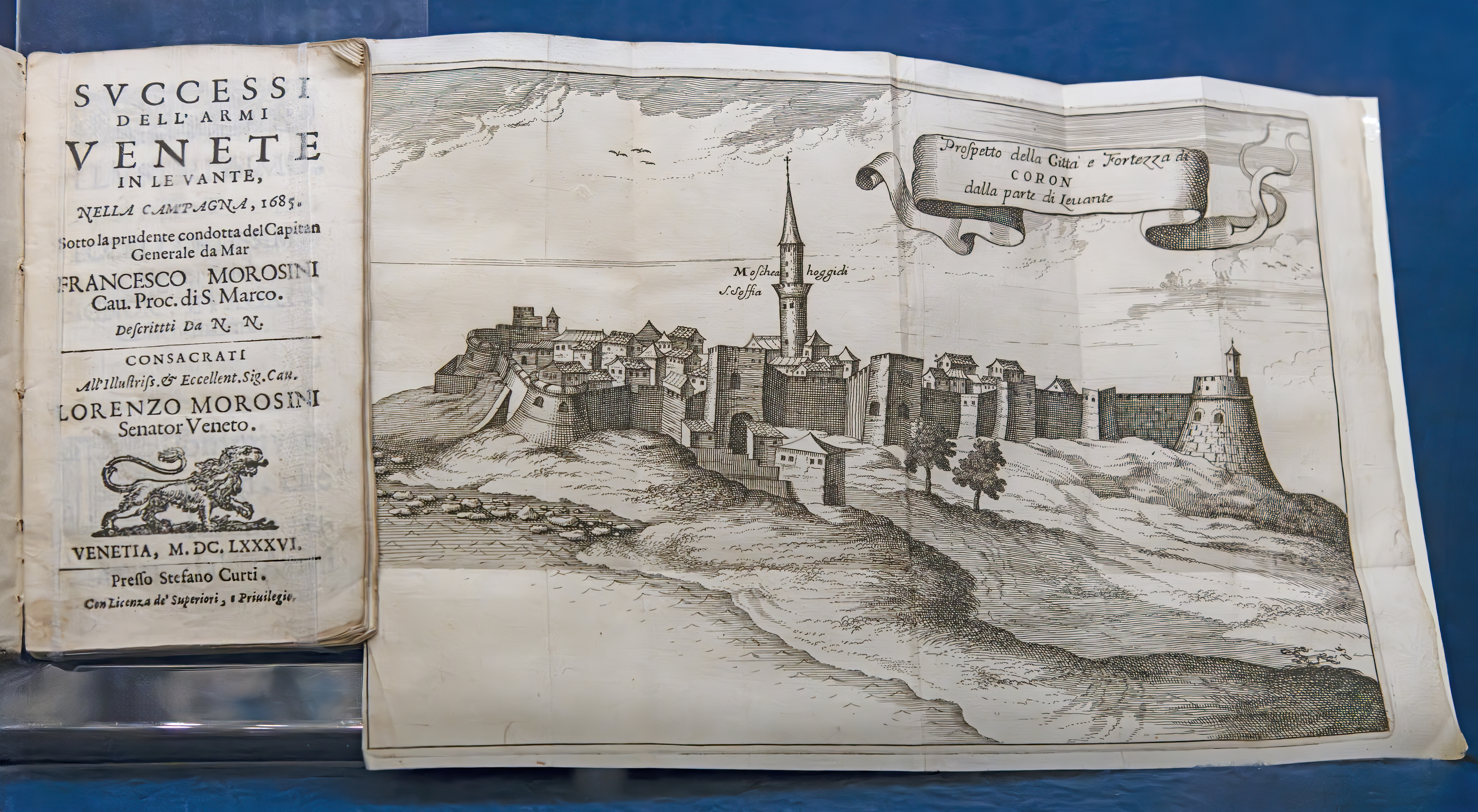
Prospect of the City and Fortress of Coron (Koroni) - Museo Correr
