= Tommaso Riccardi =

Italian Roman Catholic priest

Blessed Tommaso Riccardi O.S.B.

Priest
- Born: 24 June 1844; Trevi, Perugia, Papal States
- Died: 25 March 1915 (aged 70); Rome, Kingdom of Italy
- Venerated in: Roman Catholic Church
- Beatified: 5 December 1954, Saint Peter's Basilica, Vatican City by Pope Pius XII
- Feast: 25 March
- Attributes: Priest's cassock; Crucifix; Bible
- Patronage: Against malaria; Against diseases

Tommaso Riccardi, OSB (24 June 1844 – 25 March 1915) was an Italian Catholic priest and Benedictine monk of the Cassinese Congregation. His monastic name was Placido. He was beatified in 1954.

== Life ==
Tommaso Riccardi was born in Trevi on 24 June 1844 and spent his childhood in Umbria. He moved to Rome in 1865 in order to study for the priesthood.

He studied philosophy at the Angelicum in Rome. A pilgrimage to Loreto motivated him to enter the abbey of St. Paul Outside the Walls on 12 November 1866. He made his final profession in 1868.

As a deacon on 5 November 1870 he was arrested due to the fact that he dodged conscription; he was imprisoned in Florence and then sent as a soldier in Livorno after his release from prison on 24 December 1870. He then returned to Rome to resume his studies. He was ordained to the priesthood on 25 March 1871. He was novice master; among his novices was the future cardinal Alfredo Ildefonso Schuster.

He contracted malaria in 1881 and suffered from that disease for the rest of his life. He served as a spiritual director in Perugia from 1882 and as rector of the Basilica of Santa Maria di Farfa in 1894 and lived in hermitage near San Fiano. He served as a confessor to a convent of Poor Clares. Cardinal Schuster revered him and wrote that he prepared his Sunday sermons for three days and regretted that he could only devote four days a week to deep mental prayer.

He died on 25 March 1915 in Rome in St. Paul's Abbey.

== Beatification ==
Riccardi's spiritual writings were approved by theologians on 9 May 1934. The beatification process commenced in Rome on 27 March 1935; Pope Pius XI, granted him the title of Servant of God. Two local processes ensued, both ratified on 20 November 1940.

The recognition of his life of heroic virtue on 4 June 1944 allowed Pope Pius XII to confer upon him the title of Venerable. Pius XII also approved two miracles attributed to his intercession and beatified him on 5 December 1954 in the Pontifical decree Umbriam Sanctorum.
