= Deaths in September 2009 =

- Name, age, country of citizenship (if applicable), reason for notability, cause of death (if known), and reference.

== September 2009 ==
=== 1 ===
- Dick Berg, 87, American screenwriter and television producer, fall.
- Jake Drake-Brockman, 53, British musician (Echo & the Bunnymen) and sound recordist, motorcycle accident.
- Jock Buchanan, 74, Scottish footballer (Hibernian).
- Aubrey Buxton, Baron Buxton of Alsa, 91, British television executive and conservationist.
- Carlos Alberto Menezes Direito, 66, Brazilian judge (Supreme Federal Court) (2007–2009), pancreatic cancer.
- Gulab Mohanlal Hiranandani, 78, Indian admiral.
- Jang Jin-young, 37, South Korean actress, stomach cancer.
- Wycliffe Johnson, 47, Jamaican Reggae musician and composer, heart failure.
- Erich Kunzel, 74, American conductor (Cincinnati Pops Orchestra), cancer.
- Wayne E. Meyer, 83, American Rear-Admiral, Aegis Combat System manager, heart failure.
- Francis Rogallo, 97, American aeronautical inventor (Rogallo wing).
- John Stephens, 43, American football player (New England Patriots), NFL Offensive Rookie of the Year (1988), traffic collision.
- Alexis Tioseco, 28, Filipino-born Canadian film critic, shot.
- Sir Oliver Wright, 88, British diplomat.

=== 2 ===
- Hylton Ackerman, 62, South African cricketer.
- Guy Babylon, 52, American musician (Elton John band), heart attack.
- Brian Boshier, 77, British cricketer.
- Jon Eydmann, 41, British band manager (Suede), heart attack.
- Donald Hamilton Fraser, 80, British painter.
- Bill Hefner, 79, American politician, member of the House of Representatives for North Carolina (1975–1999), brain aneurysm.
- Virve Kiple, 82, Estonian ballet dancer, actress, and director.
- Tibor Kristóf, 67, Hungarian voice actor, Hungarian voice of Sean Connery, Morgan Freeman and Darth Vader.
- Abdullah Laghmani, 40s, Afghan Secret Service chief, bomb blast.
- Mr Percival, 33, Australian pelican, animal actor (Storm Boy), natural causes.
- John Poole, 82, British sculptor.
- Christian Poveda, 52, French photojournalist and documentary filmmaker, shot.
- Y. S. Rajasekhara Reddy, 60, Indian politician, Chief Minister of Andhra Pradesh (since 2004), helicopter crash.
- Mohamed Alí Seineldín, 75, Argentine military commander and putschist (Carapintadas).
- Robert Spinrad, 77, American computer pioneer, director of the Palo Alto Research Center, amyotrophic lateral sclerosis.
- Ismael Valenzuela, 74, American jockey, after long illness.
- Jeffrey Wernick, 56, American animation executive (DIC Animation City) and sports agent.

=== 3 ===
- Nicky Chapman, Baroness Chapman, 48, British peer, member of the House of Lords, brittle bone disease.
- Hulda Regehr Clark, 80, Canadian alternative medicine practitioner.
- Christine D'haen, 85, Belgian poet.
- Giovanni Melis Fois, 92, Italian Bishop of Nuoro (1970–1992).
- Caro Jones, 86, American casting director (Rocky, The Karate Kid, Green Acres), multiple myeloma.
- Edith Kaplan, 85, American neuropsychologist.
- Alec MacLachlan, 30, British hostage in Iraq (death confirmed on this date).
- Ronald Sarre, 77, Australian cricketer.
- Yukhym Shkolnykov, 70, Ukrainian association football coach.

=== 4 ===
- Buddy Blattner, 89, American sportscaster, baseball and table tennis player, complications from lung cancer.
- Iain Cuthbertson, 79, British actor (Gorillas in the Mist, The Railway Children).
- Allan Ekelund, 91, Swedish film producer, collaborator with Ingmar Bergman.
- Guy Guillabert, 78, French Olympic bronze medal-winning (1956) rower.
- Siegfried Gurschler, 83, Austrian sports shooter.
- Skip Miller, 62, American music industry executive, president of Motown Records, heart attack.
- Franz Olah, 99, Austrian politician, Interior Minister (1963–1964).
- Carl Reindel, 74, American actor (Bullitt, Tora! Tora! Tora!, The Andromeda Strain).
- Keith Waterhouse, 80, British author and playwright (Billy Liar), natural causes.
- Bill Welch, 68, American politician, mayor of State College, Pennsylvania, complications after leg surgery.

=== 5 ===
- Gani Fawehinmi, 71, Nigerian lawyer and human rights activist, lung cancer.
- Carl Hovde, 82, American professor, Dean during the Columbia University protests of 1968, lung cancer.
- Mickie Jones, 56, American bassist (Angel), liver cancer.
- Liang Shoupan, 93, Chinese aerospace engineer.
- Jesse Mahelona, 26, American football player (Tennessee Titans), traffic collision.
- Richard Merkin, 70, American artist.
- Saifur Rahman, 77, Bangladeshi politician, longest-serving Finance Minister, traffic collision.
- Ron Raikes, 61, American politician, Nebraska state senator (1998–2008), farm accident.
- Richard D. Robinson, 88, American educator.
- Charlie Waller, 87, American football coach.

=== 6 ===
- Christopher John Banda, 35, Malawian footballer.
- Harcharan Singh Brar, 90, Indian politician, Chief Minister of Punjab (1995–1996).
- Vanja Drach, 77, Croatian actor.
- Gerhart Friedlander, 93, German-born American nuclear chemist, coronary disease.
- Helgi Hóseasson, 89, Icelandic activist.
- José Francisco Fuentes, 43, Mexican politician, shot.
- Catherine Gaskin, 80, Irish-born Australian novelist, ovarian cancer.
- Nada Iveljić, 79, Croatian writer.
- John Merino, 42, Ecuadorian colonel, head of presidential security for Rafael Correa, swine flu.
- David J. Ritchie, 58, American game designer.
- Sim, 83, French comic actor.
- Tatyana Ustinova, 96, Russian geologist.
- Stephen White, 81, Irish Gaelic footballer, member of Ireland Team of the Century, after short illness.
- Sir David Williams, 78, British academic, Vice-Chancellor of the University of Cambridge (1989–1996), cancer.

=== 7 ===
- Medea Chakhava, 88, Georgian theatre and film actress.
- Junior Coghlan, 93, American silent film actor.
- Norman Curtis, 84, English football player and manager (Sheffield Wednesday, Doncaster Rovers).
- John T. Elson, 78, American religion editor (Time).
- Eddie Locke, 79, American jazz drummer.
- Fred Mills, 74, Canadian musician (Canadian Brass), traffic collision.
- Ra'anan Naim, 73, Israeli politician, Member of Knesset (1981–1984).
- Colin Sharp, 56, British musician and writer, brain haemorrhage.
- Paul Lê Đắc Trọng, 91, Vietnamese Bishop of Hanoi (1994–2006).
- Christos Vartzakis, 98, Greek athlete.

=== 8 ===
- Aleksandr Aksyonov, 85, Belarusian PM of Byelorussian SSR (1978–1983), Soviet Ambassador to Poland (1983–1986).
- Army Archerd, 90, American entertainment columnist (Variety), malignant mesothelioma.
- Ray Barrett, 82, Australian film, television and theatre actor, brain hemorrhage.
- Aage Bohr, 87, Danish physicist, winner of Nobel Prize in Physics (1975).
- Mike Bongiorno, 85, American-born Italian television presenter, heart failure.
- Rica Erickson, 101, Australian naturalist, artist and author.
- Henry S. Fitch, 99, American herpetologist.
- Rogelio Borja Flores, 74, Filipino sports writer, respiratory failure.
- Annie Le, 24, American graduate student, strangled.
- Kyle Woodring, 42, American drummer (Survivor), apparent suicide by hanging.

=== 9 ===
- Kevin Carmody, 84, Australian cricket umpire.
- Eric Davidson, 94, Canadian blind mechanic, survivor of the Halifax Explosion.
- Anthony G. Evans, 66, British scientist.
- Léon Glovacki, 81, French footballer, played in 1954 FIFA World Cup.
- James Krenov, 88, American cabinetmaker.
- Stanley Cornwell Lewis, 103, British painter and illustrator.
- Steve Mann, 66, American songwriter and guitarist.
- Frank Mazzuca, 87, Canadian businessman, mayor of Capreol, Ontario.
- Sultan Munadi, 32, Afghan journalist, translator and correspondent (The New York Times), shot.
- Andrzej Śliwiński, 70, Polish Bishop of Elbląg (1992–2003).

=== 10 ===
- John Asquith, 77, English cricketer.
- Frank Batten, 82, American businessman, founder of The Weather Channel.
- Lou Bender, 99, American basketball pioneer who popularized the sport in New York City, cancer.
- Kerry Brown, 51, Canadian professional wrestler, liver failure.
- Lisle C. Carter, 83, American administrator, complications from pneumonia.
- Lyn Hamilton, 65, Canadian author, cancer.
- Sam Hinton, 92, American folk singer and marine biologist.
- Margaret Holmes, 100, Australian peace activist.
- Robert H. Miller, 90, American jurist, Chief Justice of the Kansas Supreme Court (1988–1990).
- Gertrude Noone, 110, American supercentenarian, oldest person in Connecticut and world's oldest military veteran.
- Patricia Robinson, 79, Trinidadian economist, First Lady (1997–2003), wife of A. N. R. Robinson.
- Yoshifumi Tajima, 91, Japanese actor (Mothra vs. Godzilla), esophageal cancer.
- Tony Thornton, 49, American professional boxer, injuries sustained in a motorcycle accident.

=== 11 ===
- Sarane Alexandrian, 82, French art historian and philosopher.
- Juan Almeida Bosque, 82, Cuban politician, Vice President of the Council of State, cardiac arrest.
- James E. Bromwell, 89, American politician, Representative for Iowa (1961–1965).
- Jim Carroll, 60, American author (The Basketball Diaries), poet and musician, heart attack.
- Mool Chand Chowhan, 82, Indian sports official.
- Pierre Cossette, 85, Canadian television producer, brought the Grammy Awards to television.
- Larry Gelbart, 81, American comedy writer (M*A*S*H) and blogger (The Huffington Post), cancer.
- Bob Greenberg, 75, American record executive, stroke.
- Zakes Mokae, 75, South African-born American actor (Gross Anatomy), complications from a stroke.
- Georgios Papoulias, 82, Greek politician and diplomat, Foreign Minister (1989, 1990), suicide by gunshot.
- John Pattison, 92, New Zealand World War II pilot.
- Henny van Schoonhoven, 39, Dutch footballer, cancer.
- Crystal Lee Sutton, 68, American union organizer, inspiration for Norma Rae, brain cancer.
- Felicia Tang, 31, Singaporean-born American actress and model, suffocated.
- Yoshito Usui, 51, Japanese manga artist (Crayon Shin-chan), mountaineering accident.

=== 12 ===
- Norman Borlaug, 95, American agronomist and humanitarian, Nobel Peace Prize laureate (1970), cancer.
- Dominik Brunner, 50, German businessman and manager, blunt trauma.
- Jeanne Clemson, 87, American theatre director, actress and educator, Parkinson's disease.
- Raj Singh Dungarpur, 73, Indian cricket player and administrator.
- George Eckstein, 81, American television writer and producer (The Fugitive), lung cancer.
- Edward Gelsthorpe, 88, American marketing executive.
- Alfred Gottschalk, 79, German-born American President of Hebrew Union College, Reform Judaism leader, traffic collision.
- William Hoffman, 84, American novelist.
- Shah Abdul Karim, 93, Bangladeshi musician, respiratory problems.
- Jack Kramer, 88, American tennis player, cancer.
- Armando Manhiça, 66, Portuguese international footballer.
- Brian Mier, 74, Australian politician, member of the Victorian Legislative Council for Waverley (1982–1996).
- Antônio Olinto, 90, Brazilian writer, multiple organ failure.
- Danny Pang, 42, Taiwanese-born American hedge fund manager.
- Willy Ronis, 99, French photographer.
- T. R. Satishchandran, 80, Indian Administrative Service officer.
- Fred Sherman, 86, American economist and business commentator.
- Lawrence B. Slobodkin, 81, American ecologist.
- Bill Sparkman, 51, American substitute teacher and census worker, hanged.

=== 13 ===
- Philip Aziz, 86, Canadian artist, cancer.
- Felix Bowness, 87, British actor (Hi-de-Hi!).
- Paul Burke, 83, American actor (Naked City), leukemia.
- Malcolm Casadaban, 60, American molecular genetics professor, plague.
- Lonny Frey, 99, American baseball player, oldest living MLB All-Star.
- Arnold Laven, 87, American film and television director (The Rifleman, The Big Valley), pneumonia.
- Paul Shirtliff, 46, English footballer (Sheffield Wednesday, Northampton Town), cancer.
- Sarah E. Wright, 80, American novelist, complications from cancer.

=== 14 ===
- Keith Floyd, 65, British chef, heart attack.
- Henry Gibson, 73, American actor (Laugh-In, The Blues Brothers, Boston Legal), cancer.
- Bobby Graham, 69, British session drummer, stomach cancer.
- Jing Shuping, 91, Chinese businessman, founder of Minsheng Bank.
- Mike Leyland, 68, Australian travel documentary host (Leyland Brothers), complications of Parkinson's disease.
- Ralph S. Moore, 102, American horticulturist, natural causes.
- Saleh Ali Saleh Nabhan, 30, Kenyan terrorist, airstrike.
- Jody Powell, 65, American White House Press Secretary for President Jimmy Carter, heart attack.
- John Rarick, 85, American politician, Representative for Louisiana (1967–1975), cancer.
- Darren Sutherland, 27, Irish boxer, 2008 Olympic bronze medalist, suicide by hanging.
- Patrick Swayze, 57, American actor (Dirty Dancing, Ghost, Point Break), pancreatic cancer.
- Lily Tembo, 27, Zambian musician, songwriter and journalist, complications from gastritis.
- Titus, 35, African silverback gorilla.
- Bartholomew Yu Chengti, 90, Chinese clandestine Roman Catholic prelate.
- Elio Zagato, 88, Italian car designer.

=== 15 ===
- Nicu Constantin, 70, Romanian actor.
- George Crumbley, 86, American founder of the Peach Bowl.
- Fred Cusick, 90, American sports commentator (Boston Bruins), complications from bladder cancer.
- Leon Eisenberg, 87, American child psychiatrist, prostate cancer.
- Tommy Greenhough, 77, British cricketer.
- Troy Kennedy Martin, 77, British screenwriter (Z-Cars, Edge of Darkness, The Italian Job), liver cancer.
- Michael Knox, 48, American co-founder of Park Place Productions, producer of John Madden Football, colon cancer.
- Espiridion Laxa, 79, Filipino independent film producer, prostate cancer.
- Gerald Lestz, 95, American columnist and author, founder of the Demuth Museum.
- Lincoln Maazel, 106, American singer and actor.
- Vladimír Padrta, 56, Slovak Olympic basketball player.
- Kallie Reyneke, 87, South African Olympic racewalker.
- Trevor Rhone, 69, Jamaican playwright, heart attack.

=== 16 ===
- Brian Barron, 69, British journalist and war correspondent, cancer.
- Timothy Bateson, 83, British actor.
- Myles Brand, 67, American NCAA president, pancreatic cancer.
- W. Horace Carter, 88, American newspaper website, 1953 Pulitzer Prize winner, heart attack.
- Monte Clark, 72, American football player and coach (Detroit Lions), cancer.
- Luciano Emmer, 91, Italian film director (Three Girls from Rome).
- Sotero Laurel, 90, Filipino politician, Senator (1986–1992), President Pro Tempore (1990–1991).
- John Littlewood, 78, British chess player
- Lori Mai, 31, German-American folk rock singer, amyotrophic lateral sclerosis.
- Ernst Märzendorfer, 88, Austrian conductor.
- Julian Niemczyk, 89, American Ambassador to Czechoslovakia (1986–1989), cardiac arrest.
- Filip Nikolic, 35, French singer and actor, drug overdose.
- Steve Romanik, 85, American football player (Chicago Bears).
- Melvin Simon, 82, American shopping mall developer (Simon Property Group), producer (Porky's), Indiana Pacers owner.
- Mary Travers, 72, American singer (Peter, Paul and Mary), leukemia.
- Dorothy Wellman, 95, American dancer and actress, widow of William Wellman.

=== 17 ===
- Tommy Burnett, 67, American politician, Tennessee House of Representatives (1970–1990).
- Virginia Chadwick, 64, Australian politician, cancer.
- Frank Deasy, 49, Irish Emmy Award-winning screenwriter (Prime Suspect: The Final Act), liver cancer.
- Dick Durock, 72, American actor and stuntman (Swamp Thing), pancreatic cancer.
- Sue Eakin, 90, American history professor.
- Bernie Fuchs, 76, American illustrator, esophageal cancer.
- Dick Hoover, 79, American professional bowler.
- Randy Johnson, 65, American football quarterback (Atlanta Falcons).
- Leon Kirchner, 90, American Pulitzer Prize-winning composer, heart failure.
- Bob Kowalkowski, 65, American football player and coach (Detroit Lions).
- Robert Searcy, 88, American member of the Tuskegee Airmen, colorectal cancer.
- Noordin Mohammad Top, 41, Malaysian terrorist, shot.
- Geoff Williamson, 86, Australian Olympic bronze medal-winning (1952) rower.

=== 18 ===
- Peter Denyer, 62, British actor (Please Sir!).
- James Donnewald, 84, American politician, Illinois Treasurer (1983–1987).
- Doug Fisher, 89, Canadian journalist and politician, MP for Port Arthur (1957–1965).
- Pearl Hackney, 92, British actress, widow of Eric Barker.
- Mahlon Hoagland, 87, American biochemist.
- Doreen Jensen, 76, Canadian sculptor.
- Irving Kristol, 89, American neoconservative advocate and editor (The Public Interest), lung cancer.
- Natalia Shvedova, 92, Russian lexicologist.
- John J. Wild, 95, American physician, co-developer of ultrasound use in cancer detection.

=== 19 ===
- Gabriel Beaudry, 82, Canadian Olympic rower.
- Willy Breinholst, 91, Danish author.
- Alan Deyermond, 77, British hispanist.
- Arthur Ferrante, 88, American pianist (Ferrante & Teicher), natural causes.
- Stevie Gray, 42, British footballer (Aberdeen FC).
- Víctor Israel, 80, Spanish actor.
- Monty Kaser, 67, American professional golfer, prostate cancer.
- Milton Meltzer, 94, American historian and author, esophageal cancer.
- Maurizio Montalbini, 56, Italian sociologist and caver, heart failure.
- Elizaveta Mukasei, 97, Russian Soviet-era spy, wife of Mikhail Mukasei.
- Jose Antonio Ortega Bonet, 79, Cuban-born businessman and philanthropist, founder of Sazón Goya Food Company, cancer.
- Roc Raida, 37, American DJ (The X-Ecutioners), cardiac arrest after a spinal cord injury.
- Joseph-Marie Sardou, 86, French archbishop Emeritus of Monaco.
- Eduard Zimmermann, 80, German journalist and television presenter.

=== 20 ===
- Mario Bertolo, 80, French cyclist.
- Freddy Bienstock, 86, American music website (Carlin America).
- Hernan Córdoba, 19, Colombian footballer, traffic collision.
- Bertil Gärtner, 84, Swedish Lutheran bishop of Gothenburg (1970–1991).
- John Hart, 91, American actor (The Lone Ranger).
- Ken Hough, 80, New Zealand cricketer and footballer.
- Yusuf Khan, 79-80, Pakistani actor, cardiac arrest.
- Booker Moore, 50, American football player (Buffalo Bills), heart attack.
- Bayo Ohu, 45, Nigerian journalist and news editor (The Guardian), shot.
- Eddy Prentice, 88, New Zealand cricketer.

=== 21 ===
- Robert Ginty, 60, American actor and director, cancer.
- Michael Lockett, 29, British soldier, improvised explosive device.
- Myroslav Marusyn, 85, Ukrainian archbishop, Secretary Emeritus of the Congregation for the Oriental Churches.
- Piers Merchant, 58, British politician, MP for Newcastle upon Tyne Central (1983–1987) and Beckenham (1992–1997), cancer.
- Parviz Meshkatian, 54, Iranian musician and composer, cardiac arrest.
- Junzo Shono, 88, Japanese author, member of the Japan Art Academy.
- Sula Wolff, 85, British child psychiatrist.

=== 22 ===
- Marco Achilli, 60, Italian footballer.
- Manuel Bermejo Hernández, 73, Spanish politician, MP for Cáceres.
- Kole Čašule, 88, Macedonian writer.
- Edward Delaney, 79, Irish sculptor.
- Olaf Dufseth, 91, Norwegian Olympic Nordic combined and cross-country skier.
- Andréa Maltarolli, 46, Brazilian telenovela screenwriter (Beleza Pura), cancer.
- Bruce McPhee, 82, Australian race car driver, won Hardie Ferodo 500 (1968).
- Dirce Migliaccio, 75, Brazilian actress, pneumonia.
- Summer Squall, 22, American thoroughbred racehorse, 1990 Preakness Stakes winner, euthanized.
- Charlotte Turgeon, 97, American chef and author, influenza.
- S. Varalakshmi, 84, Indian actress and singer, complications from a fall.
- Wess, 64, Italian singer, placed third in Eurovision Song Contest 1975.

=== 23 ===
- Paul B. Fay, 91, American politician, Acting Secretary of the Navy (1963), Alzheimer's disease.
- Gigolo FRH, 26, German-bred dressage horse, four-time Olympic gold medalist, euthanized.
- Ertuğrul Osman, 97, Turkish 43rd Head of the Imperial Ottoman Dynasty, lung and kidney failure.
- Dennis Pacey, 80, British footballer (Leyton Orient, Millwall), aneurysm.
- Stuart Robertson, 65, British-born Canadian journalist and gardener, complications from pneumonia.
- Bill Speirs, 57, British trade union leader, after long illness.
- George M. Sullivan, 87, American politician, Mayor of Anchorage, Alaska (1967–1981), lung cancer.
- Marie Wadley, 102, American co-founder of the Five Civilized Tribes Museum.
- Don Yarborough, 83, American politician, Parkinson's disease.

=== 24 ===
- Nelly Arcan, 36, Canadian novelist, suicide by hanging.
- Susan Atkins, 61, American murderer ('Manson Family' member), brain cancer.
- Pudhota Chinniah Balaswamy, 80, Indian Bishop of Nellore.
- Keith Batchelor, 78, Australian rules footballer (Collingwood, North Melbourne).
- Terry Bly, 73, British footballer (Norwich City, Peterborough United), heart attack.
- Forrest Church, 61, American Unitarian Universalist minister, author and theologian, esophageal cancer.
- Cryptoclearance, 25, American thoroughbred racehorse, complications from colic surgery.
- Joseph Satoshi Fukahori, 84, Japanese Bishop of Takamatsu.
- Joseph Gurwin, 89, Lithuanian-born American textile manufacturer and philanthropist, heart failure.
- Kevork Hovnanian, 86, Iraqi-born American businessman, founder of Hovnanian Enterprises.
- Rogers McVaugh, 100, American botanist.
- Sir Howard Morrison, 74, New Zealand singer, heart attack.
- Emile Norman, 91, American artist, natural causes.
- Robert Sahakyants, 59, Armenian animator, complications from heart surgery.
- Egon Solymossy, 87, Hungarian Olympic athlete (death announced on this date).
- Mimi Weddell, 94, American actress (Student Bodies, The Thomas Crown Affair).
- Margo Wilson, 66, Canadian psychologist.

=== 25 ===
- István Bujtor, 67, Hungarian actor and director, coccidiosis.
- Pierre Falardeau, 62, Canadian film director, cancer.
- Alicia de Larrocha, 86, Spanish pianist.
- Maria Gulovich Liu, 87, Slovak resistance member, cancer.
- Clifton Maloney, 71, American businessman, husband of U.S. Representative Carolyn B. Maloney, mountaineering accident.
- Steeve Nguema Ndong, 37, Gabonese Olympic judoka.
- Francis Noel-Baker, 89, British politician, MP for Brentford and Chiswick (1945–1950) and Swindon (1955–1969).
- Bob Stupak, 67, American casino owner (Vegas World, Stratosphere Las Vegas), leukemia.
- David Will, 72, British vice president of FIFA, former Brechin City F.C. chairman, cancer.

=== 26 ===
- Sir John Dyke Acland, 16th Baronet, 70, British aristocrat, traffic collision.
- Geoff Barrowcliffe, 77, British footballer (Derby County).
- Tony Chua, 43-44, Filipino sports executive, Barako Bulls team manager, drowning during Tropical Storm Ondoy.
- Zygmunt Chychła, 83, Polish boxer, 1952 Olympic gold medalist.
- W. I. B. Crealock, 89, British yacht designer.
- Amy Farris, 40, American fiddler and singer-songwriter, suicide.
- John Hyson, 81, American museum curator and historian.
- Ingvi Sigurður Ingvarsson, 84, Icelandic diplomat.
- Paul Medhurst, 55, British-New Zealand cyclist.
- Nihat Nikerel, 59, Turkish actor, heart attack.
- Alfred Oglesby, 42, American football player (Miami Dolphins).
- Soeprapto, 85, Indonesian politician, Governor of Jakarta (1982–1987).
- David Underdown, 84, British historian, author of definitive work on Pride's Purge.

=== 27 ===
- Alimsultan Alkhamatov, 44, Russian politician and official, head of the Khasavyurt region of Dagestan, shot.
- John Connell, 69, American artist.
- Ivan Dykhovichny, 61, Russian film director, screenwriter, cancer.
- Donald Fisher, 81, American businessman, founder of The Gap, cancer.
- John Holmes, 57, British rugby league player, cancer.
- Charles Snead Houston, 96, American physician, mountaineer, inventor, author and filmmaker.
- Hans-Heinrich Jescheck, 94, German professor.
- Li Hou, 86, Chinese politician.
- Manuel Mandel, 72, Brazilian Olympic rower.
- Donal McLaughlin, 102, American architect, designer of the Flag of the United Nations, esophageal cancer.
- Dewald Roode, 69, South African academic, fall.
- William Safire, 79, American speechwriter and journalist (The New York Times), pancreatic cancer.

=== 28 ===
- Apostolos of Kilkis, 85, Greek bishop of Kilkis.
- René Bliard, 76, French footballer (Stade Reims).
- Guillermo Endara, 73, Panamanian politician, President (1989–1994).
- Imre Katzenbach, 45, Hungarian footballer.
- Ulf Larsson, 53, Swedish actor, stage director and revue artist.
- Best Ogedegbe, 55, Nigerian footballer, complications from surgery.
- Luis Sánchez-Moreno Lira, 83, Peruvian archbishop Emeritus of Arequipa.
- Don Thompson, 85, American baseball player (Brooklyn Dodgers).

=== 29 ===
- Micheline Beauchemin, 79, Canadian tapestry and textile artist.
- Henry Bellmon, 88, American Governor of Oklahoma (1963–1967; 1987–1991), U.S. Senator (1969–1981), Parkinson's disease.
- Ebony Dickinson, 32, American basketball player, breast cancer.
- Gunnar Haugan, 84, Norwegian character actor.
- Julian Hope, 2nd Baron Glendevon, 59, British opera producer, cancer.
- Margo Johns, 90, British actress.
- Greg Ladanyi, 57, American record producer and recording engineer, complications from a fall.
- Jean Ladd, 86, American baseball player (AAGPBL).
- Ray Nettles, 60, American-born Canadian football player (BC Lions), cancer.
- John L. Pollock, 69, American philosopher.
- Pavel Popovich, 78, Ukrainian-born Soviet cosmonaut.
- Ed Sherman, 97, American football coach (Muskingum College).
- Nick Strutt, 62, British country musician.
- Sperantza Vrana, 81, Greek film actress, singer and writer, heart attack.
- Vladimir Yakovlev, 79, Soviet Olympic sailor.

=== 30 ===
- Sir Alastair Aird, 78, British Royal courtier.
- Pentti Airikkala, 64, Finnish rally driver, prostate cancer.
- Rafael Arozarena, 86, Spanish writer and poet.
- Robert S. Baker, 93, British film and television producer (The Saint, The Persuaders!).
- John Couey, 51, American murderer, killer of Jessica Lunsford (the inspiration for Jessica's Law), prostate cancer.
- Robert Haase, 86, American lawyer.
- Roland La Starza, 82, American actor and professional boxer.
- Raúl Magaña, 69, Salvadoran footballer and manager, gastric cancer.
- Byron Palmer, 89, American actor, natural causes.
- Birender Singh, 88, Indian politician, Chief Minister of Haryana (1967), cardiac arrest.
- Victor Van Schil, 69, Belgian cyclist.
