= Joseph Morton =

Joseph Morton may refer to:

- Joseph Morton (governor) (died 1721), early colonist and governor of the Province of Carolina
- Joseph Morton (correspondent) (1911 or 13–1945), American war correspondent
- Joe Morton (born 1947), American actor
