= Wernick =

Wernick is a surname. Notable people with the surname include:

- Jeffrey Wernick (1953–2009), American animation executive and sports agent
- Mickey Wernick (1944–2023), English bookmaker and professional poker player from Birmingham
- Paul Wernick (born 1977), American television and film producer and screenwriter
- Pete Wernick (born 1946), also known by many as "Dr. Banjo", American musician
- Richard Wernick (1934–2025), American composer from Boston, Massachusetts
- Sidney W. Wernick (1913–1995), justice of the Maine Supreme Judicial Court
