= Richard Robinson =

Richard Robinson may refer to:

== Government ==
- Richard Robinson (Municipal Reform politician) (1849–1928), English politician and chemist
- Richard A. Robinson (born 1957), Justice of the Connecticut Supreme Court
- Richard Earl Robinson (1903–1991), U.S. federal judge
- Richard H. Robinson (California politician) (born 1943), California politician
- Richard H. Robinson (New Mexico Attorney General), Attorney General of New Mexico from 1953 to 1956

== Sports ==
- Dicky Robinson (1927–2009), English footballer
- Rich Robinson (Canadian football) (born 1946), Canadian football player
- Richie Robinson (born 1946), Australian cricketer
- Richard Robinson (cricketer) (1950–2002), English cricketer
- Richard Robinson (chess player) (1956-2009), American and Bermudian chess player

== Others ==
- Richard Robinson (actor) (died 1648), English actor
- Richard Robinson, 1st Baron Rokeby (1708–1794), Irish theologist
- Richard Robinson (philosopher) (1902–1996), English secularist
- Richard Robinson (Buddhism scholar) (1926-1970), Buddhism scholar
- Richard Robinson (chief executive) (1937–2021), American chief executive officer of Scholastic Corporation
- Richard Robinson (festival director) (born 1953), puppeteer based in the UK
- Richard D. Robinson (educator) (1921–2009), American educator
- Richard D. Robinson (engineer), American materials scientist
- Richard Robinson (fashion designer), Canadian fashion designer
- Rich Robinson (born 1969), American musician

== See also ==
- Richard Robson (disambiguation)
