= Richard Robson =

Richard Robson may refer to:

- Richard Robson (politician) (1867–1928), Australian politician
- Richard Robson (chemist) (born 1937), Australian Nobel laureate in chemistry
- Richard Robson, producer of "Imagination"

== See also ==
- Richard Bateman-Robson (1753–1827), English MP
- Richard Robinson (disambiguation)
