= Mr. Fox =

Early 1970s British folk rock band

Mr Fox
- Origin: England
- Genres: British folk rock – folk music
- Years active: 1970–72
- Past members: Richie Bull; Alan Eden; Barry Lyons; Andrew Massey; John Myatt; Bob Pegg; Carole Pegg; Nick Strutt

Mr Fox were an early 1970s British folk rock band. They were seen as in the 'second generation' of British folk rock performers and for a time were compared with Steeleye Span and Sandy Denny's Fotheringay. Unlike Steeleye Span they mainly wrote their own material in a traditional style and developed a distinct 'northern' variant of the genre. They demonstrate the impact and diversity of the British folk rock movement and the members went on to pursue significant careers within the folk rock and traditional music genres after they disbanded in 1972 having recorded two highly regarded albums.

== History ==
=== Origins ===
Bob Pegg and Carole Butler (both born in 1944) met, as young folk singers, at the Nottingham Folk Workshop when they were still at school. Performing as a duo they began to establish a reputation in the Midlands, appearing regularly on the local TV news/magazine programme Midlands at Six. In 1963 they married and moved to Leeds, where Bob was studying English Literature. They continued to sing together and, in 1965, they contributed three tracks to the Transatlantic Records LP The Second Wave (other artists on the record were Harvey Andrews, Dave Sless and Spike Woods).

In 1967, at a gig in a Leeds rock venue, Bob and Carole met Ashley Hutchings, the Fairport Convention bass player. Ashley - known in those days as "Tyger" - became a regular guest in the Peggs' Leeds flat, which they shared with their young daughter Clancy. By this time Bob was researching the folk music of the Yorkshire Dales in the university's Institute of Dialect and Folk Life Studies, and Ashley/Tyger was captivated by the tape recordings of hardcore English traditional music that he heard in the Pegg household. The friendship continued in 1969, after the Peggs moved from Leeds to Stevenage, where Bob took up a post as lecturer in English at the College of Further Education. After a devastating road accident in which two people connected with Fairport Convention died, Ashley Hutchings left the band and went to live with the Peggs. By this time the Bob and Carole were well known nationally on the folk music scene as traditional performers, but they were interested in folk rock and had begun to write their own material. They discussed forming a band with Ashley, but, after a couple of unproductive rehearsals, he formed a new group, Steeleye Span, whose initial members included Tim Hart and Maddy Prior, Terry Woods, of the Irish band Sweeney's Men, and his wife Gay. During 1969 the Peggs had been making an LP for record producer Bill Leader, who encouraged them to write and record their own material (these recordings were released in 1971 as He Came From the Mountains). Some of the tracks, including a version of Sydney Carter's Lord of the Dance, used an instrumental line-up of fiddle, melodeon, cello, bass and drums, which was inspired by the old village bands of the Yorkshire Dales. This would become the hallmark of the Mr Fox band. Bill Leader played the tapes for Nat Joseph of Transatlantic Records, who signed the Peggs up, despite his having had a previous contractual disagreement with them in the aftermath of 1965's The Second Wave. For their first album they recruited Alan Eden (drums), Barry Lyons (bass), Andrew Massey (cello) and John Myatt (clarinet, bass clarinet, bassoon) and adopted the name Mr Fox, which was also the title of their signature song, based on a bloody English folk tale - a version of the Bluebeard legend - in which a young woman outwits a serial killer.

=== The albums ===
The group's first eponymous album, released in 1970, was unlike the work of Fairport Convention and Steeleye Span, as it diverged from a conventional rock band format. The material consisted of original compositions written by the Peggs, together with a Dave Mason tune, 'Little Woman,' and the songs 'Salisbury Plain' and 'Mr Trill's Song' which had music by Bob Pegg and lyrics by Ashley Hutchings. The use of classically trained musicians and the wide variety of instruments (including electric organ, melodeon, tin whistle, terrapin, fiddle, cello, flute, clarinet, bassoon, in addition to electric bass and drums) produced a hybrid sound which was predominantly acoustic in character. The album was well received by the music press and was made Melody Maker folk album of the year.

Massey and Myatt left for economic reasons soon after the first album was released. As a result, the second album, The Gipsy (1971), had less complex instrumentation, but was more experimental. A more varied album than the first offering, it was again based around self-penned material, but included two traditional songs 'The House Carpenter' and the final track 'All the Good Times', with new verses by Bob Pegg. The Gridley Tabernacle Choir and Orchestra are credited on 'All the Good Times'. In fact this was an invented name for an ad hoc gathering of musicians and singers - including Rod and Danny Stradling, and members of Swan Arcade - who were overdubbed three times to produce a massive chorus sound.

=== Break-up and after ===
The band had a reputation as an unpredictable live act, sometimes startlingly good and sometimes lacklustre. At the Loughborough Folk Festival in 1971 they were on the same bill as Steeleye Span and, while the latter put in a memorable performance, Mr Fox were on bad form and the band was heavily criticised in the press, an event often seen as a turning point in the band's fortunes. Recordings made by the couple before the group was formed were released as He Came from the Mountain (1971), but by this point the Peggs' marriage was already under strain. In 1972 Eden and Lyons quit to join Trees, and were replaced by guitarist Nick Strutt and Ritchie Bull on bass. When Carole left later that year the band dissolved.

Carole (as Carolanne Pegg) recorded an eponymous solo album in 1973, and briefly formed the band Magus with jazz R & B maestro Graham Bond before moving on to become a respected ethnomusicologist. Recordings of songs by Sydney Carter made by the Peggs before the band were formed were released as And Now it is So Early in 1973. Bob Pegg recorded two albums with Nick Strutt: Bob Pegg and Nick Strutt (1973) and The Shipbuilder (1974). He then made a solo album Ancient Maps (1975), before moving on to become an author, oral historian and entering theatre education. The band's two albums were released as a double album set on vinyl in 1975 and on CD in 2004.

== Style and significance ==
Despite the comparisons with Steeleye Span, Mr Fox had a very distinctive style from contemporaneous British folk rock bands. They did not rely on electric guitars, but did use drums. They also used a very wide range of instruments, prefiguring some of the developments that would be undertaken by The Albion Band and Home Service. Carole Pegg had an unusual fiddle style, quite unlike Fairport's Dave Swarbrick or Steeleye Span's Peter Knight, based partly on what she had learnt from older Yorkshire fiddle players. They also used more complex, perhaps more staid, classical arrangements for their songs, leading one critic to note that their songs sounded, ‘as if they had been penned by Bartok’. The distinctive feature of their music was the dominance of self-penned songs drawing on the atmosphere and folklore of the Yorkshire Dales, often, like 'The Hanged Man' (the story of a lost fell walker coming to grief), sounding like modern day Child Ballads. One thing they lacked was an outstanding singer like Maddy Prior or Sandy Denny, with Carole Pegg's vocals usually being perceived as eerie or atmospheric in their best moments, so much so that they have been described as 'psychedelic'.

== Members ==
- Richie Bull (bass)
- Alan Eden (drums)
- Barry Lyons (electric bass, dulcimer)
- Andrew Massey (cello)
- John Myatt (woodwind)
- Bob Pegg (vocals, penny whistle, ocarina, melodeon, guitar, bass, keyboards)
- Carole Pegg (fiddle, vocals)
- Nick Strutt (guitar, mandolin, bass)

== Discography ==
Albums

- Mr Fox (Transatlantic, 1970)
- The Gipsy (Transatlantic, 1971)
- The Complete Mr Fox (Transatlantic,1975)
- Join Us in our Game (Castle Music, 2004)

Bob and Carole Pegg

- He Came from the Mountain (Trailer, 1971)
- With Sydney Carter And Now It Is So Early: The Songs of Sydney Carter (Galliard, 1973)

Carolanne Pegg

- Carolanne Pegg (Transatlantic, 1973)

Bob Pegg and Nick Strutt

- Bob Pegg and Nick Strutt (Transatlantic, 1973)
- The Shipbuilder (Transatlantic, 1974)

Bob Pegg

- Ancient Maps (Transatlantic, 1975)
- The Last Wolf (Rhiannon, 1996)
- Keeper of the Fire: the Anthology (Sanctuary, 2006)
