= Litmanová =

Village and municipality in Slovakia

- Municipality
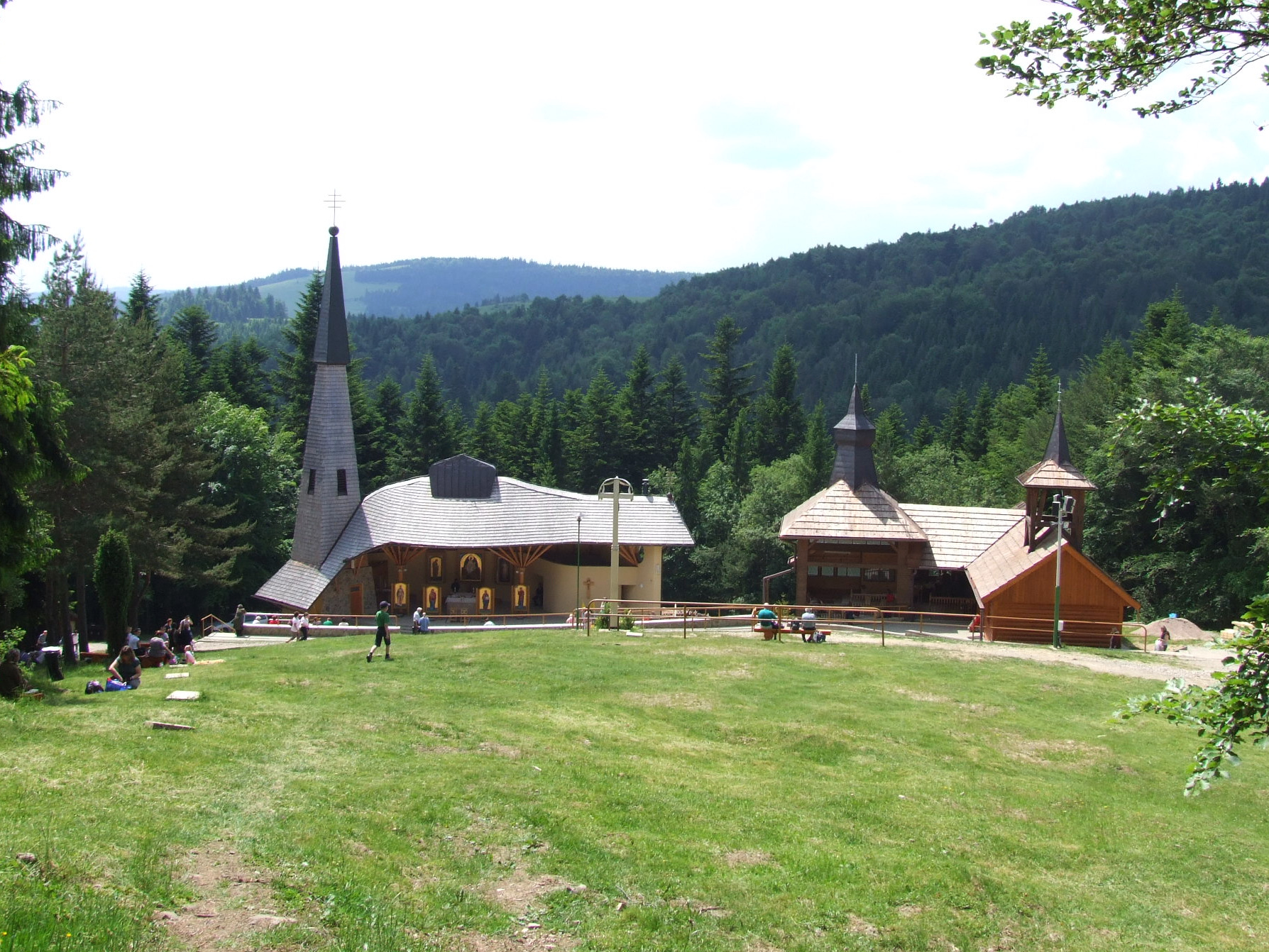

- Flag

- Location of Litmanová in the Prešov Region Location of Litmanová in Slovakia
- Coordinates: 49.37°N 20.63°E
- Country: Slovakia
- Region: Prešov Region
- District: Stará Ľubovňa District
- First mentioned: 1412

Area
  - Total: 17.90 km^{2} (6.91 sq mi)
- Elevation: 656 m (2,152 ft)

Population (2025)
  - Total: 605
- Time zone: UTC+1 (CET)
  - Summer (DST): UTC+2 (CEST)
- Postal code: 653 1
- Area code: +421 52
- Vehicle registration plate (until 2022): SL
- Website: www.litmanova.sk

Litmanová Hungarian: Hársád, until 1902: Littmanova; German: Littmannsau; Rusyn: Літманова; Ukrainian: Литманова) is a village and municipality in Stará Ľubovňa District in the Prešov Region of northern Slovakia. A small ski resort and a Catholic religious site are located in Litmanová.

== History ==
In historical records the village was first mentioned in 1412, when Hungary leased Litmanová to Poland in an effort to raise money for a war. After 360 years of Polish rule, Poland returned Litmanová to Hungary in 1772. Before the establishment of independent Czechoslovakia in 1918, Litmanová was part of Szepes County within the Kingdom of Hungary. From 1939 to 1945, it was part of the Slovak Republic. On 24 January 1945, the Red Army dislodged the Wehrmacht from Litmanová and it was once again part of Czechoslovakia. Finally, in 1993, through a joint decision, Czechoslovakia was partitioned into two independent countries, Czechia and Slovakia. Since this time, Litmanová has been part of independent Slovakia. Many residents emigrated to the United States in the early 20th century.

== Geography ==
The municipality lies at an altitude of 656 metres (2,152 ft) and covers an area of 17.90 km^{2} (6.91 sq mi) (2025). No roads cross the border here, but there are a number of hiking trails with border crossings.

== Population ==
Population statistic (10 years)
Year	1995	2005	2015	2025
Count	652	633	643	605
Difference		−2.91%	+1.57%	−5.90%

Population statistic
Year	2024	2025
Count	617	605
Difference		−1.94%

It has a population of 605 people (31 December 2025).

=== Ethnicity ===
Census 2021 (1+ %)
Ethnicity	Number	Fraction
Slovak	500	78.98%
Rusyn	366	57.81%
Not found out	28	4.42%
Other	8	1.26%
Total	633	

In year 2021 was 633 people by ethnicity 500 as Slovak, 366 as Rusyn, 28 as Not found out, 8 as Other, 3 as Ukrainian and 2 as Polish.

Note on population: The difference values of population numbers in the table "Population statistic" and in the sections "Ethnicity" & "Religion" is caused by the use of various statistical methods.

=== Religion ===
Census 2021 (1+ %)
Religion	Number	Fraction
Greek Catholic Church	519	81.99%
Roman Catholic Church	45	7.11%
None	29	4.58%
Eastern Orthodox Church	19	3%
Not found out	16	2.53%
Total	633	

In year 2021 was 633 people by religion 519 from Greek Catholic Church, 45 from Roman Catholic Church, 29 from None, 19 from Eastern Orthodox Church, 16 from Not found out, 4 from Other and not ascertained christian church and 1 from Paganism and natural spirituality.

== Government ==
Litmanová’s government consists of a head mayor and seven councilmen. Elections are held every four years. Each official is elected by the village people. There are no term limits.

== Education ==
Education in this small village is limited to one tiny schoolhouse. The school holds roughly: 80 pupils, 10 teachers, a principal and a vice-principal. Only grades 1 to 4 are taught here. For further education, pupils must travel to the nearest city, Stará Ľubovňa, approximately 12 km (7 miles) away.

== Marian apparitions ==
Between 1990 and 1995, two young girls - Ivetka Korčáková (born 1978) and Katka Češelková (born 1977) - reported several apparitions of the Blessed Virgin Mary under the title of The Immaculate Purity on Zvir Mountain in Litmanová. During these religious events, the visionaries were accompanied by many priests, and now there is a Marian shrine at the place of the apparitions. Many people, not only Slovaks, make pilgrimages to this location to celebrate the Divine Liturgy and obtain water from a holy stream.

The Vatican issued a nihil obstat declaration regarding the site on 8 July 2025, which does not officially affirm the apparitions as supernatural, but "nevertheless permits the approval of public devotion and informs the faithful that they can safely approach this spiritual offering, if they so wish".

== Notable residents ==
- Maria Gulovich Liu, OSS agent in WWII
