= Gerald Lestz =

American writer

- Born: March 29, 1914; Lancaster, Pennsylvania, U.S.
- Died: September 15, 2009 (aged 95); Lancaster Township, Pennsylvania, U.S.
- Occupations: Columnist, author, publisher
- Spouse(s): Edith Allport Lestz (?-1957; her death); Margaret Gordon Dana (?-2006; her death)

Gerald S. Lestz (March 29, 1914 – September 15, 2009) was an American newspaper columnist, author, activist, philanthropist and publisher. Lestz is credited with leading the efforts to found the Demuth Museum at the childhood home of artist Charles Demuth on East King Street in Lancaster, Pennsylvania.

== Biography ==
=== Early life ===
Lestz, the first child of immigrant parents, Jacob and Fannie Simon Lestz, was born on March 29, 1914, at their home at 511 South Shippen Street in Lancaster, Pennsylvania.

Lestz graduated from the now defunct Lancaster Boys High School in 1931. He earned his bachelor's degree in merchandising from the Wharton School of the University of Pennsylvania in 1935.

His first job after college was at the upstart Lancaster Independent weekly newspaper. Lestz was hired to write the names of subscribers in circulation books for a starting salary of $15 per week. The now-defunct newspaper's editor, Willim N. Yonung, later promoted Lestz to a reporter.

Gerry Lestz enlisted in the United States Army Air Force during World War II. He met his first wife, Edith Allport Lestz, during the war years. The couple moved to Lancaster following World War II and had two children. Edith Allport Lestz died in 1957. Lestz later married his second wife, Margaret Gordon Dana, an artist, who died in 2006.

=== Career ===
Lestz returned to his native Lancaster after World War II, where he began writing for the Lancaster New Era newspaper. Lestz would remain on staff at the Lancaster New Era for more than thirty years, focusing on feature articles, columns and editorials. On December 17, 1957, began writing The Scribbler column, a regular piece on Lancaster's history which had appeared in the Lancaster New Era since 1919 (with the exception of a period during World War II). Lestz continued to write The Scribbler twice a week, every week, until his retirement from the newspaper in 1979. Following Lestz's retirement, The Scribbler was taken over by Jack Brubaker, who continues to write the now weekly column as of 2011.

=== Civic involvement ===
Lestz also headed efforts to establish several cultural and civic institutions in Lancaster. For example, Lestz co-founded the Historic Preservation Trust of Lancaster County.

Most notably, Lestz led the campaign to establish the Demuth Museum at the restored childhood home of Charles Demuth, Lancaster's most famous native artist. The museum was known as the Charles Demuth Foundation at the time of its establishment in 1981. Lestz served as the Demuth Foundation's president for museum's first three years. Under Lestz, the Demuth Foundation acquired the Charles Demuth home on East King Street, which became the museum. Lestz and the Foundation also purchased the property next door to the future Demuth Museum from Dorothea and Christopher Demuth. That second property houses the oldest continually operating tobacco shop in the United States. Both structures were converted into a museum by the Foundation which houses works by Charles Demuth as well as the tobacco shop.

Carol Morgan, who became the director of the Charles Demuth Foundation in 1985, noted Lestz's contributions the museum and foundation after examining Lestz records, "I was absolutely stunned at the amount of personal work, planning and bureaucratic threading he went through to get that thing launched."

Lestz also helped to found the Heritage Center of Lancaster County, and served as the organizations president. He also served as the president of the Lancaster Summer Arts Festival, the Lancaster Public Library, Lancaster Community Concert Association, as well as the state president for the Pennsylvania Guild of Craftsmen.

=== Writings ===
Lestz also published dozens of books and pamphlets on a variety of topics related to history, architecture, the Amish community, folklore and art. He published and edited the Baer's Almanac from 1948 until 2008. The Baer's Almanac is a Lancaster County publication founded in 1825.

From 1986 to 2002, he was publisher of The Strasburg Weekly News, a small newspaper founded in 1898, and continued to contribute a weekly column to the paper until his death.

=== Death ===
Gerry Lestz died at his home on Conestoga Drive in Lancaster Township, Pennsylvania, on September 15, 2009, at the age of 95. He was survived by his son, Michael Elliot Lestz, daughter, Linda Lestz Weidman; stepson, Robert Gordon Dana; eight grandchildren and eight great-grandchildren.
