= Nick Strutt =

- Born: 8 October 1946
- Origin: England
- Died: 29 September 2009 (aged 62) Great Yarmouth, England
- Genre: folk music
- Years active: 1970–2009

Nicholas Charles Strutt (8 October 1946 – 29 September 2009), was a British country and folk musician. He was particularly noted for his mandolin playing, and worked and recorded with a number of well-known musicians of his time.

Strutt first played banjo at the age of 15 and then mastered guitar, autoharp, mandolin and bass. In 1965 he relocated to Leeds and graduated from Leeds University in 1970. Between 1966 and 1969 he played in a duo with Roger Knowles which featured regularly on radio, including the BBC's Country Meets Folk, where they sometimes played with Brian Golbey and Pete Stanley as a four-piece unit. Strutt and Knowles played as support for Hank Snow and Willie Nelson on UK appearances, before their influences saw them turn more to seminal country rock. In 1970 Strutt turned fully professional, and between 1969 and 1971 he and Knowles played with Natchez Trace. In 1972, they parted amicably with Knowles opting for more traditional music and Strutt favouring the contemporary. He had already joined Bob Pegg and Carole Pegg in the folk rock band Mr. Fox, and, after this highly rated but commercially unsuccessful unit's demise, recorded two duo albums with Bob Pegg. When folk rock waned, Strutt returned to country music, playing regularly around the northern country club scene.

In the late 1970s, he worked on production and played as a session musician for the now defunct Look label. Here he worked with many artists, especially with Mel Hague but also produced albums for folk singer Alex Campbell and country star Tommy Collins. In the early 1980s, he turned more to old-time music again and often worked and recorded with Brian Golbey. He commented that "with the advent of New Country, line dancing and blander performances, our picking and grinning style was regarded as a novelty." During the mid-1980s, Strutt played part-time with various units, including a swing quartet, but returned full-time in 1990. He began teaching guitar, mandolin and bass and appeared regularly with Hague's band. He also played old-time music at regular venues with banjoist Tim Howard of the Muldoon Brothers. In 1994, he began working with a trio called Finnegan's Wake.

Strutt acknowledged the influence of Bill Monroe and John Duffey but confessed: "I was never any good at stealing licks accurately, so I made up my own; copying any instrument I liked be it trumpet, dobro, clarinet or trombone." He used to run jam sessions in Leeds, which often featured 20 musicians on numerous different instruments.

In 2003, Strutt made a temporary home for himself in the Shoulder Of Mutton in Castleford. This temporary home lasted three years, where he was much loved for playing his music in the pub. Nick Strutt made many friends within the area and decided to form a band which they called 'Steal Away'. The band consisted of: Nick Strutt on mandolin (backing vocals) Stevie Mac on guitar (lead vocalist) Graham Hall on fiddle Steve Parker on bass guitar (backing vocals)

Three years later, Strutt moved down to Caistor and Hemsby.

Nick Strutt died on 29 September 2009 at his home in Great Yarmouth, from liver failure. He had spent a large portion of his life in Leeds, marrying Sue and having three children as well as attending university. His funeral took place in Leeds on Friday 16 October and was arranged by Sue and his three children Wezley, Bradley and Holly. The funeral service was held at St John's church in Wortley followed by cremation at Lawnswood.

== Recordings ==
- Bob Pegg and Nick Strutt (Transatlantic, 1973)
- The Shipbuilder (with Bob Pegg) (Transatlantic, 1974)
- Brian Golbey & Nick Strutt Last Train South (Waterfront, 19??)
