= Hans-Heinrich Jescheck =

German law professor

Hans-Heinrich Jescheck Prof. Dr. Dr. h. c. mult.
- Born: 10 January 1915; Liegnitz
- Died: 27 September 2009 (aged 94); Freiburg im Breisgau
- Awards: Knight's Cross of the Iron Cross

Academic work
- Institutions: University of Freiburg; Max Planck Institute for Foreign and International Criminal Law
- Main interests: Jurisprudence

Hans-Heinrich Jescheck (10 January 1915 – 27 September 2009) was a German professor of law at the University of Freiburg (1954–1980). He was also director of the Max Planck Institute for Foreign and International Criminal Law in Freiburg (until 1982). He was rector of the University of Freiburg from 1964 to 1965.

In Nazi Germany, he was an officer in the Wehrmacht during World War II and a recipient of the Knight's Cross of the Iron Cross.

== Awards ==
- Knight's Cross of the Iron Cross on 5 March 1945 as Hauptmann of the Reserves and leader of Panzer-Aufklärungs-Abteilung 118
