= Elizaveta Mukasei =

Lt. Col. Elizaveta Ivanovna "Elza" Mukasei (née Emelianov; Russian: Елизаве́та Ива́новна Мукасе́й; 21 March 1912, Ufa – 19 September 2009, Moscow) was a Soviet spy codenamed Elza. Along with her husband Mikhail Mukasei (whose codename was Zephyr), she took part in a number of undercover operations in Western Europe and the United States from the 1940s through to the 1970s.

She was awarded numerous state awards, including the Medal "For Military Merit." She was also awarded the Order of St. Prince Alexander Nevsky, 1st Class, and the Order of Yury Andropov (with a gold medal) for her outstanding contribution to ensuring the security of the Russian Federation.

She died on 19 September 2009, in Moscow at age 97. Her husband died on 19 August 2008, aged 101.
