= Ralph S. Moore =

American rose breeder

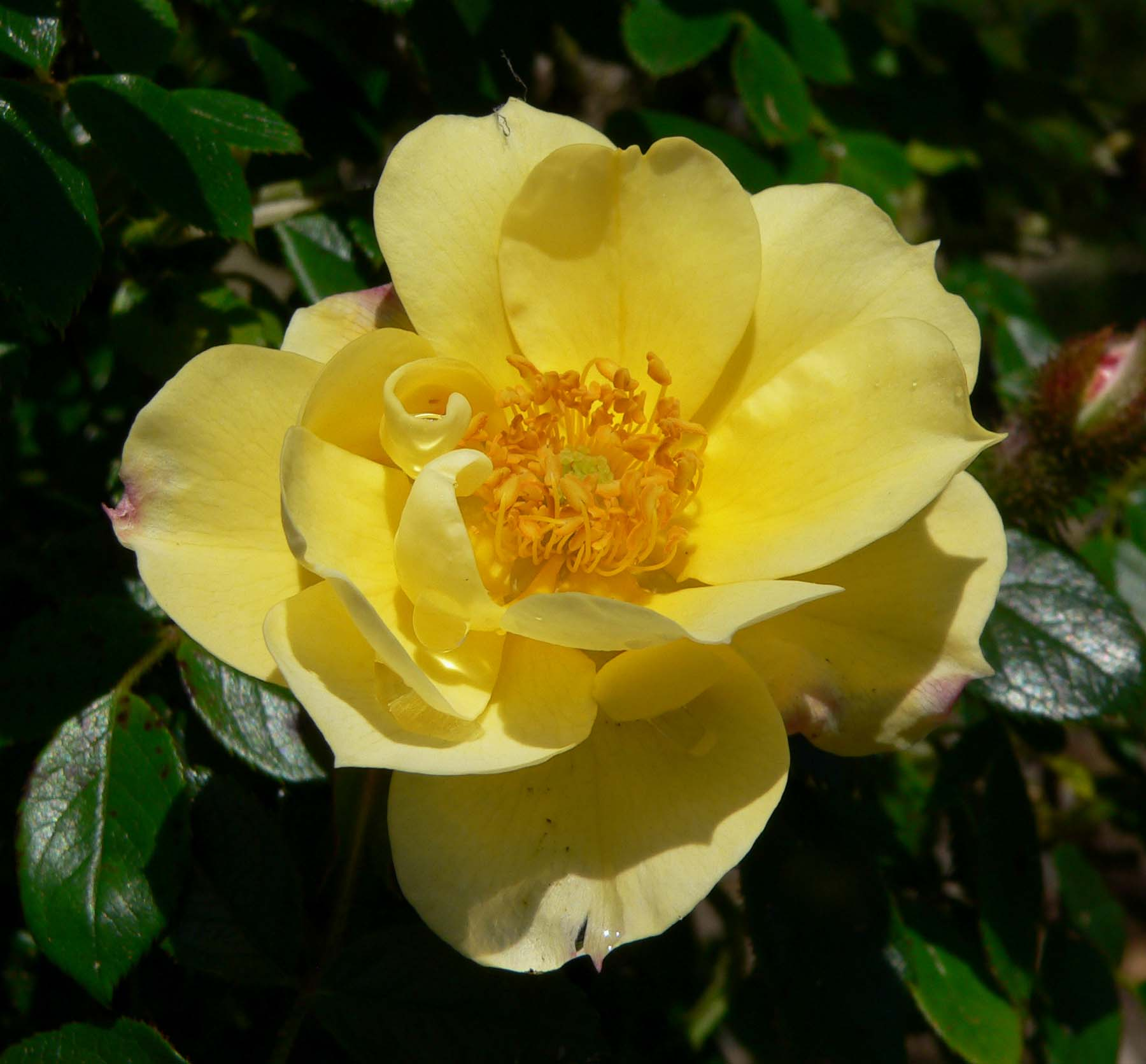
'Lemon Delight', 1978

Ralph S. Moore (January 14, 1907 – September 14, 2009) was an American miniature rose breeder. He is known by many as the “Father of the Modern Miniature Rose”. During his career, Moore developed over 500 new varieties of miniature roses, including the award-winning 'Rise n' Shine' and 'Anne Moore'.

== Early life ==
Moore was born on January 14, 1907, in Visalia, California. He was the oldest child of Orlando and Muriel Witherell Moore. Moore's father was a commercial vegetable grower. Moore was first introduced to roses in his grandparents's garden in Visalia. He graduated from the local high school and enrolled in Visalia Junior College. He later attended the University of California, Davis. Moore began experimenting with breeding roses during his holidays from school. His first successful rose cultivars were developed around 1928: Polyantha 'Baby Mine', Rambler 'Shelby Wallace', and Hybrid Multiflora 'Gypsy Queen'. He later started to breed Hybrid teas.

== Career ==
Moore enjoyed working with small roses. He later decided to develop and sell miniature roses. In 1937 he opened the nursery Sequoia Nursery in Visalia where he bred and sold mostly roses and other plant varieties. He played an important role in the return to popularity of Miniature roses, which had been abandoned by rose breeders and gardeners in the 19th century. By 1957, Moore turned his business into a specialty nursery, Moore Miniature Roses. During his long career, Moore introduced over 500 new miniature rose hybrids, including the award-winning "Ann Moore", named after his wife, Ann. Other cultivars introduced by Moore were the single-petalled Miniature 'Simplex' (1961), the first yellow-flowered modern Moss Rose, 'Goldmoss' (1972) or the orange-red Floribunda 'Playtime' (1989).

Moore is known by many of his peers as the “Father of the Modern Miniature Rose”. On May 29, 2003, in downtown Visalia, the Ralph Moore Rose Garden was dedicated to Ralph to honor his achievements as a rose breeder. The rose garden contains 300 of his roses. On January 14, 2007, Moore celebrated his 100th birthday at the Visalia Convention Center. There he received an award from the Royal National Rose Society of Great Britain and the American Rose Society. He also received a flag that was flown over the United States Capitol on January 8, 2007, in his honor.

On April 30, 2008, his retail rose business, Sequoia Nursery, closed. Moore gave all his plants and breeding stock, 80 rose patents, and a cash donation to Texas A&M University's horticultural sciences department. The university already had an existing rose breeding program, and it maintains the Robert E. Basye Endowed Chair in Rose Breeding. Moore's donation enlarged the rose breeding program to include miniature roses. He died at the age of 102 of natural causes at the Kaweah Health Medical Center, Visalia, California.

== Rose gallery ==
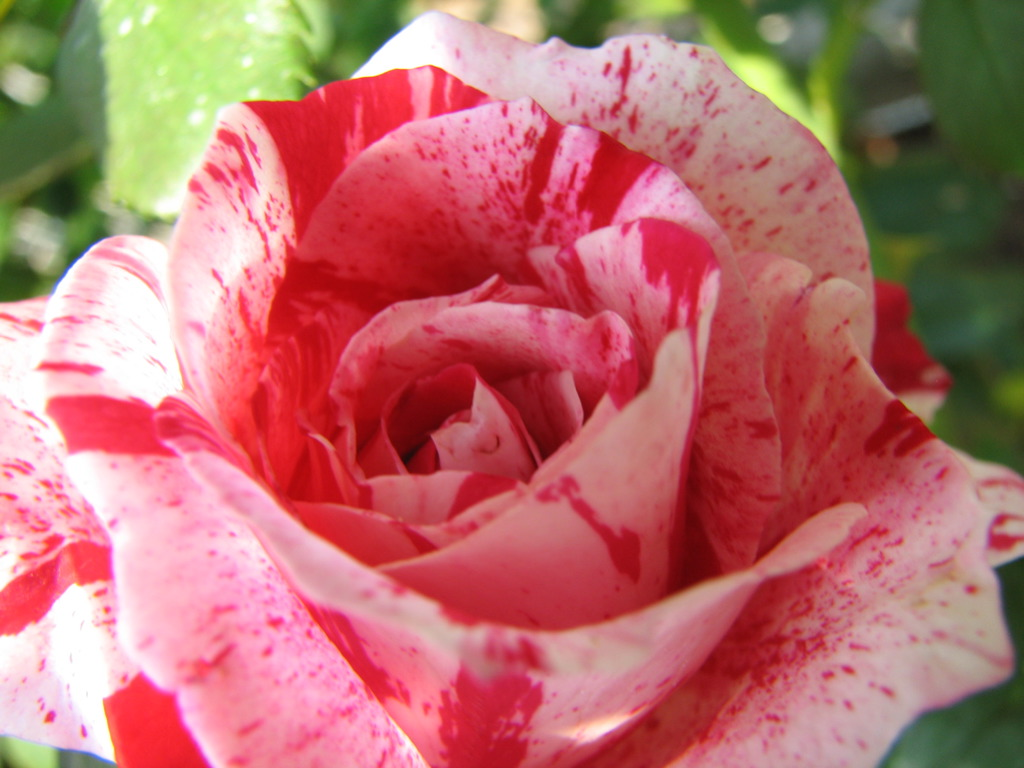
'Stars n' Stripes', (1976)

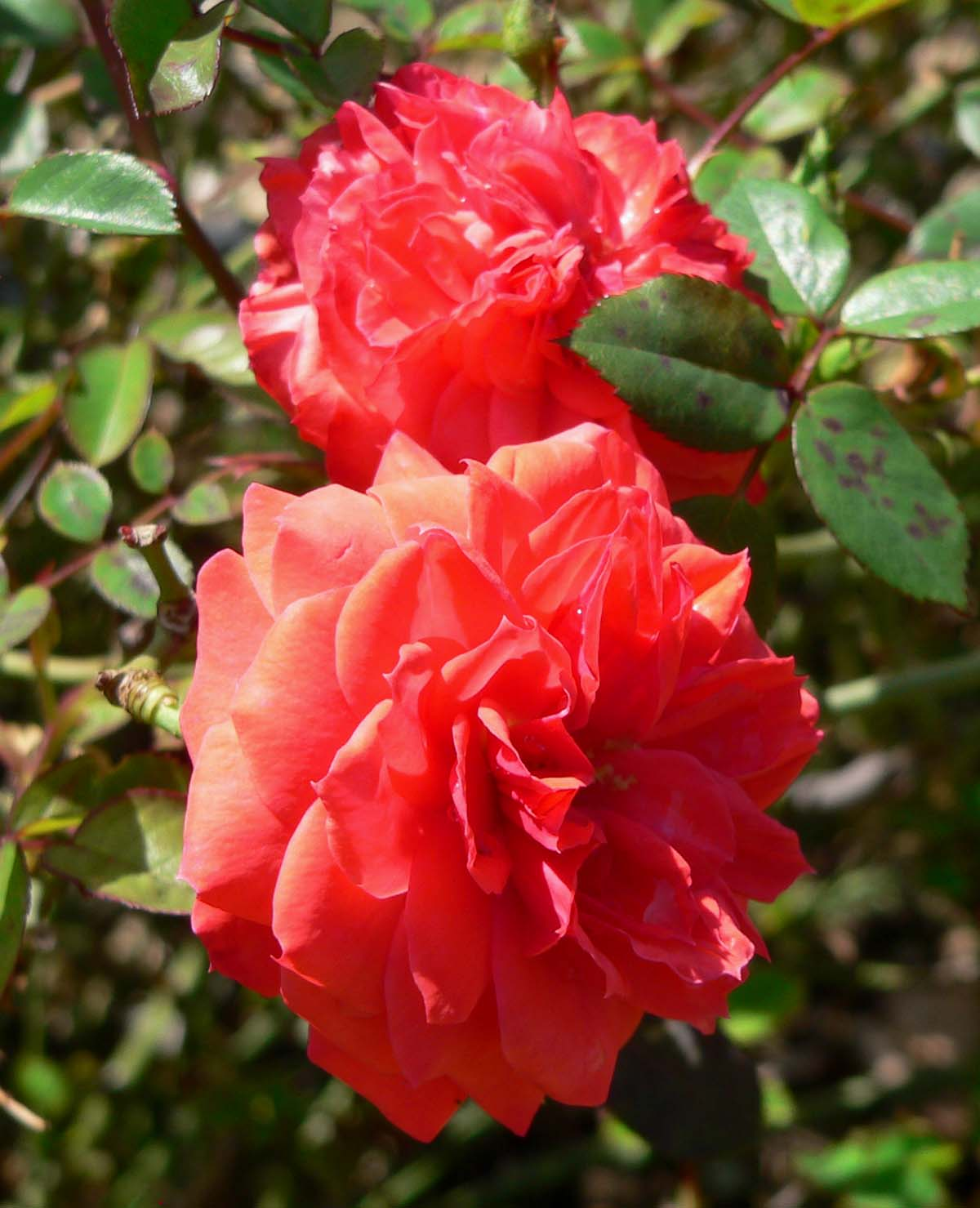
'Millie Walters', (1983)

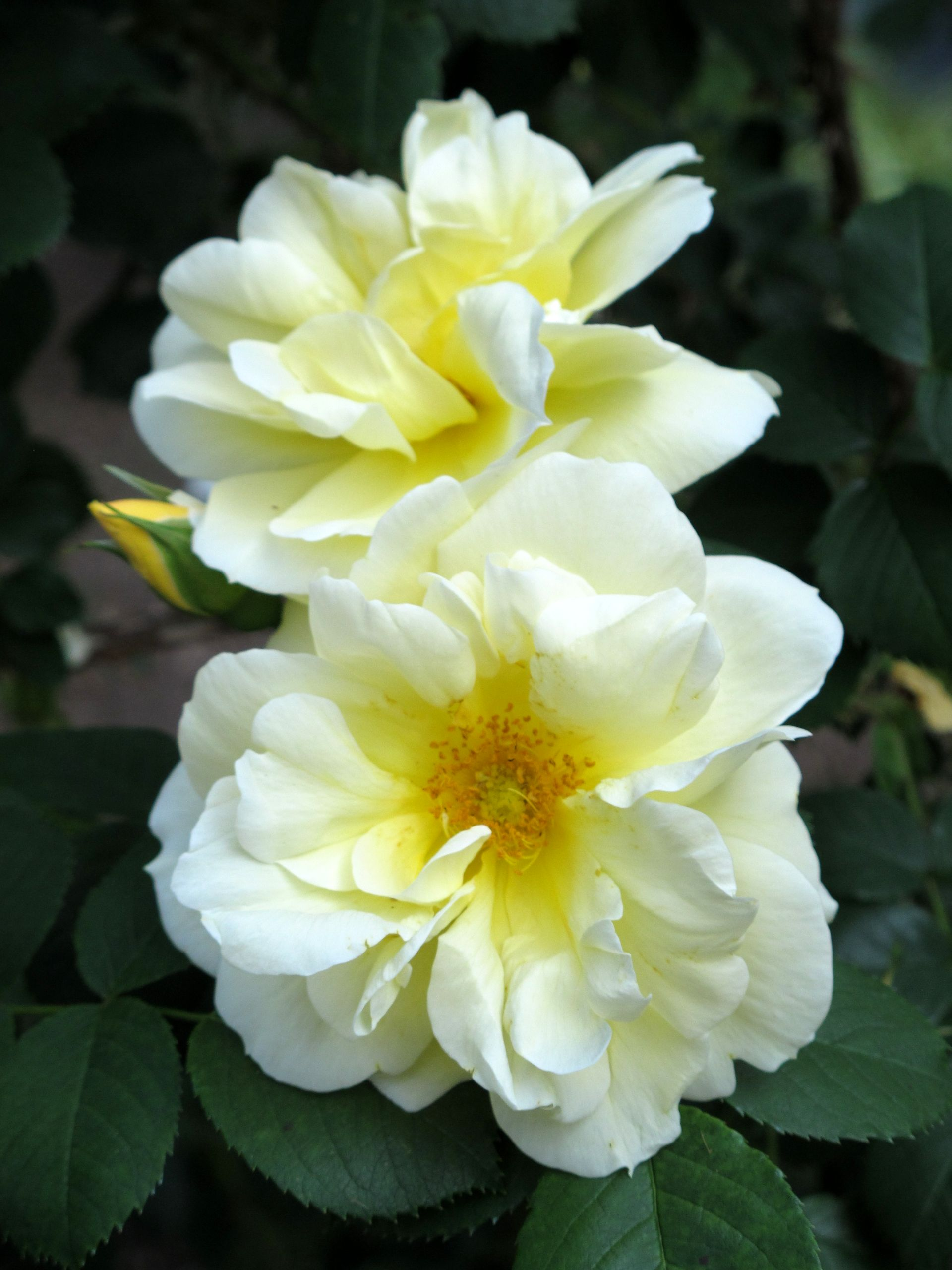
'Yellow Dagmar Hastrup', (1987)

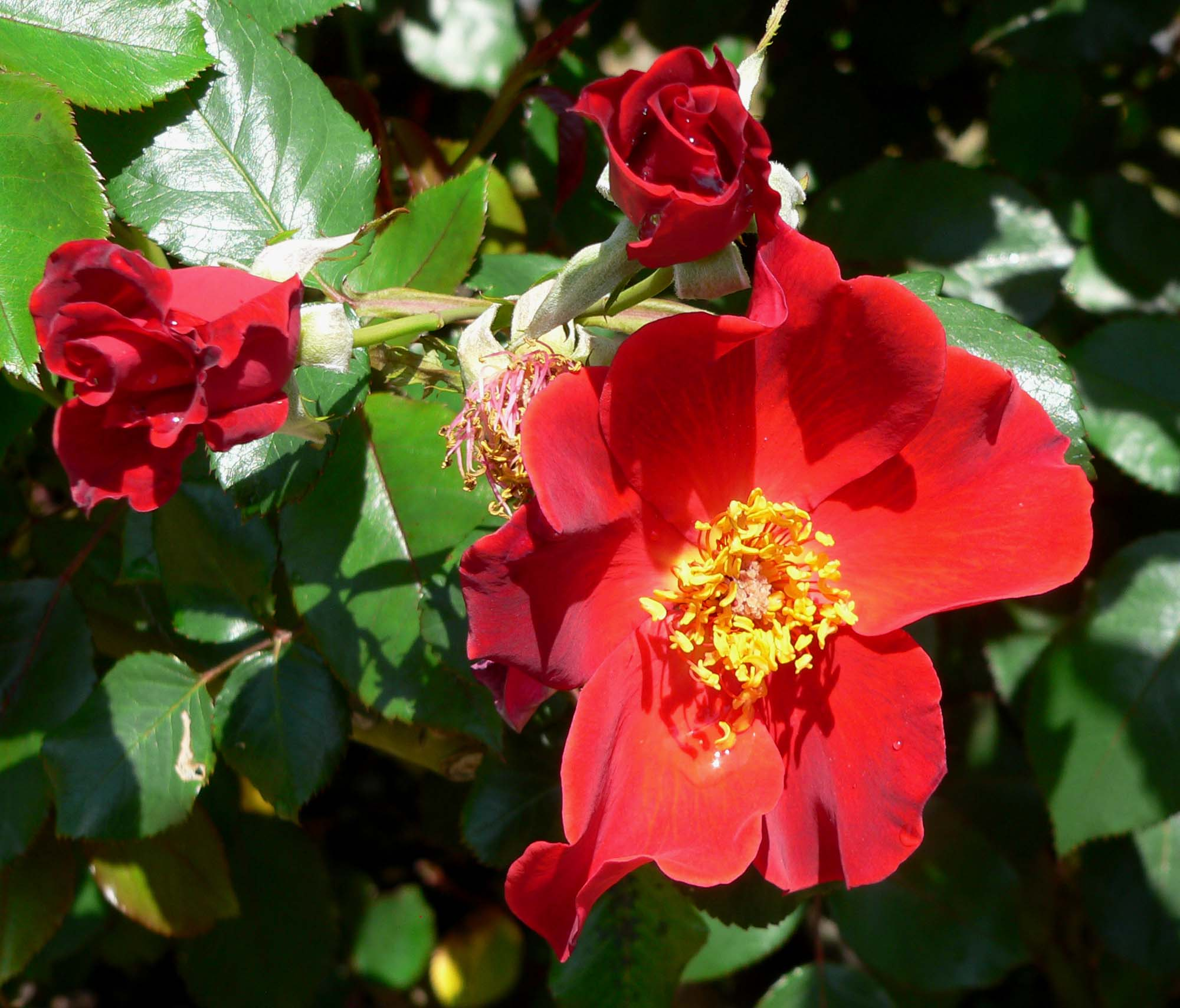
'Playtime', (1989)

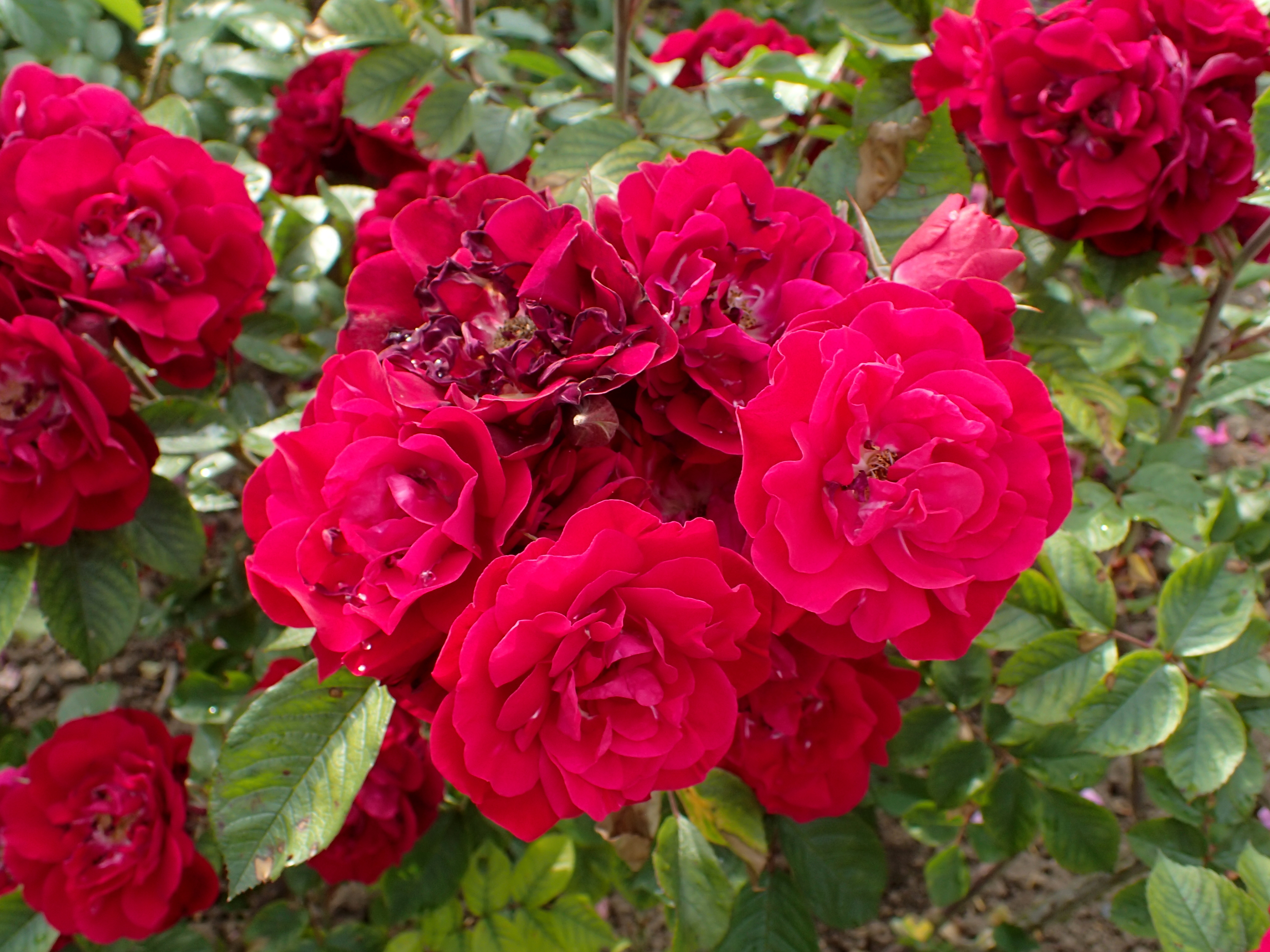
'Linda Campbell', (1990)

== See also ==
- Tom Carruth
- Jack E. Christensen
