= John Hyson =

John Miller Hyson, Jr.
- John Hyson, photograph from Baltimore Sun
- Born: October 17, 1927; Baltimore, Maryland
- Died: September 26, 2009 (aged 81); Towson, Maryland
- Occupations: Dentist, dental historian, writer, museum curator
- Spouse: Elayne (Rhein) Hyson
- Children: John M. Hyson III and Gerald M. Hyson
- Writing career
- Subject: Dental history

John Miller Hyson Jr. (October 17, 1927 – September 26, 2009) was the former curator, director of curatorial services, and director of archives and history at the National Museum of Dentistry, an affiliate of the Smithsonian Institution located in Baltimore, Maryland. He was also the author of many articles and books on the history of dentistry and was a practicing dentist for nearly 50 years.

== Early years ==
Hyson was born in Baltimore, Maryland, the son of a dentist. He graduated from the University of Maryland Dental School in 1950. He also received a master's degree in oral surgery from the school in 1959.

== Dental practice ==
From 1950 to 1953, he served in the U.S. Air Force as a dental officer at Eglin Air Force Base in Okaloosa County, Florida. He attained the rank of captain and was discharged from the military in 1953.

From 1953 to 1999, he conducted a general dental practice in Idlewylde, Maryland and later in Towson, Maryland. He was also a member of the visiting dental staff at the University of Maryland Medical Center and taught oral surgery and operative dentistry at the University of Maryland Dental School during the 1950s.

== Dental historian and writer ==
Hyson wrote numerous articles about the history of dentistry, including articles on the history of the toothbrush, George Washington's dental health and wooden dentures, women dentists, African-American contract dental surgeons in the Spanish–American War, Dr. James Baxter Bean and the establishment of first military maxillofacial hospital and the founding of the West Point Dental Service. Hyson's articles were published in journals, including Journal of the History of Dentistry, Military Medicine, and the Bulletin of the History of Dentistry.

In 1994, he published an article titled "Did You Know A Dentist Embalmed President Lincoln?" in the Bulletin of the History of Dentistry.

Hyson also wrote two books on dental history: "History of the Baltimore College of Dental Surgery: The World's First Dental School," and "A History of Dentistry in the U.S. Army to World War II."

== Dental archivist and collector ==
Hyson was also affiliated with the National Museum of Dentistry as curator (1992–1996), director of curatorial services (1996–2002), and director of archives and history (2002–2003). In 1999, he received a master's degree in museum studies from the University of Delaware.

Hyson was also a collector of historic dental memorabilia, including instruments, dental office furniture, U.S. Army Dental Corps uniforms and a folding dental chair from a World War I field hospital.

== Family and death ==
Hyson was a resident of Timonium, Maryland. In September 2009, Hyson died of a stroke. Hyson was survived by his wife of 59 years, the former Elayne Rhein, and two sons, John M. Hyson III and Gerald M. Hyson.

== Selected publications ==
- "A history of arsenic in dentistry," Journal of the California Dental Association, Feb. 2007
- "Amalgam: Its history and perils," Journal of the California Dental Association, March 2006
- "The dental duel," Journal of History of Dentistry, Spring 2006, p. 24
- "The dental key: a dangerous and barbarous instrument," Journal of History of Dentistry, Nov. 2005, p. 95
- "Robert T. Oliver, DDS: oral surgeon, army dental chief, president ADA," Journal of History of Dentistry, Nov. 2003, p. 121
- "Dental Service Base Hospital No. 18: Johns Hopkins Hospital 1917-19," Journal of History of Dentistry, Nov. 2003, p. 115
- "Dr. Newell Sill Jenkins: progenitor of cosmetic dentistry," Journal of the California Dental Association, Aug. 2003
- "History of the toothbrush," Journal of History of Dentistry, July 2003, Vol 51, Num 2, pp 73–80, 8 p; ref : 41 ref PMID 12846261 ISSN 1089-6287
- "Women dentists: the origins," Journal of the California Dental Association, June 2002
- "George Franklin Grant, DMD: renaissance man," Journal of the California Dental Association, Dec. 2002
- "The air turbine and hearing loss: are dentists at risk?," Journal of the American Dental Association, Dec. 2002
- "Chapin A. Harris' forceps: the Arnold Ruby set," Journal of History of Dentistry, July 2002
- "Man and pain: eternal partners," Journal of History of Dentistry, Nov. 2001
- "The 'Amex' cast aluminum denture of World War I," Journal of History of Dentistry, July 2001
- "George Washington's dental history and relics" (University of Delaware, 1999)
- "The mystery of John Wilkes Booth's dentist," Journal of History of Dentistry, Nov. 1999
- "Basil Manly Wilkerson: dental inventor extraordinaire," Journal of History of Dentistry, July 1999
- "Doctors five: African-American contract surgeons in the Spanish–American War," Military Medicine, June 1999
- "Richard Bayly Winder: Andersonville quartermaster and dental college dean," MSDA, Spring 1998
- "Patient bites dentist: an 1894 case report," Journal of History of Dentistry, July 1998
- "James Baxter Bean: the first military maxillofacial hospital, MSDA, Spring 1997.
- "Mercury poisoning with tooth loss: an 1813 case report," Journal of History of Dentistry, March 1997
- "Portrait of a confederate secret agent: Henry A. Parr, DDS," July 1996
- "African-American dentists in the U.S. Army: the origins," Military Medicine, July 1996
- "The soldier dentist: Colonel John R. Lewis of the 5th Vermont," Journal of History of Dentistry, July 1995
- "Female dentists in the U.S. Army: the origins," Military Medicine, Feb. 1995
- "Did you know--a dentist embalmed President Lincoln?," Bulletin of the History of Dentistry, Nov. 1994
- "Dental forensics: the fate of Lieutenant Harrington at the Little Big Horn," Bulletin of the History of Dentistry, Nov. 1993
- "The suicide of General Emory Upton: a case report, Military Medicine, Oct. 1990
- "The United States Military Academy dental service: a history, 1825-1920," (U.S. Military Academy 1989)
- "William Saunders: the United States Army's first dentist--West Point's forgotten man," Military Medicine, Aug. 1984
