= Maria Gulovich Liu =

- Mária Gulovichová Liuová
- Born: Mária Gulovičová; October 19, 1921; Litmanová, Czechoslovakia
- Died: September 25, 2009 (aged 87); Port Hueneme, California, United States
- Awards: Bronze Star

Maria Gulovich Liu (Slovak: Mária Gulovichová Liuová; October 19, 1921 – September 25, 2009) was a Slovak schoolteacher who joined the overground resistance during World War II. She was awarded the Bronze Star for her "heroic and meritorious" service in aiding agents of the American Office of Strategic Services (OSS) and British intelligence escape Nazi-occupied territory during the winter of 1944-1945.

== Biography ==
Gulovich was born in Litmanová, Czechoslovakia, on October 19, 1921. She was the blue-eyed daughter of Edmund Gulovich who was a Greek Catholic village priest and Anastasia who was an elementary school teacher. She attended the Greek Catholic Institute for Teachers in Prešov. She became a school teacher in Jarabina in 1940 and later in Hriňová.

After Slovakia was occupied by Germany in 1939, Gulovich continued to teach. In early 1944, a Jewish friend asked Gulovich to hide his sister and her five-year-old son. She later recalled, "I never intended to hide anyone. My sister brought the woman's brother and he was crying and I'm a softie. And he said, 'Would you hide her just for a few days until she finds something else?' She never did. I was stuck with them."

From April through June 1944, Gulovich hid the woman and her son in the Hriňová schoolhouse where she taught, allowing them to stay in the living quarters while she slept in the classroom.

Her concealment of the Jews was reported to the Slovak authorities, and a Slovak Army captain was sent to question Gulovich about her actions. Fortunately for Gulovich, the Slovak officer sent to investigate was part of the anti-fascist resistance. Gulovich later recalled, "Lucky for me. Otherwise we wouldn't be here."

The Slovak officer offered to find a new hiding place for the woman and her son if Gulovich would become a courier for the resistance. Gulovich reluctantly agreed and moved to Banská Bystrica, where she was employed as a dressmaker for an underground sympathizer.

Her first mission required her to smuggle a short-wave radio in a suitcase on a train. She had a close call when the Gestapo stopped the train and began methodically checking all the passengers' luggage. In a 1989 interview, she recalled the incident as follows:

There was a bunch of Wehrmacht officers sitting in a compartment and one started flirting with me -- which I gladly returned. They said, 'Fraulein' -- I spoke German at the time -- 'would you sit with us?' They made a seat for me in the compartment and the officer carried my suitcase into the compartment with him. The Gestapo came by, saluted, and went on."

Because of her fluency in five languages (including Russian, Hungarian, Slovak) as well as speaking a little English, Gulovich was assigned to work as a translator for the resistance. When the Slovak National Uprising began at end of August 1944, she worked in the rebel headquarters translating documents from Slovak into Russian for Soviet military intelligence.

During the summer of 1944, Gulovich was introduced to American OSZ agents who had been sent to assist the Slovak uprising and rescue downed American airmen.

In October 1944, the Germans crushed the uprising, and Gulovich fled to the mountains where Soviets, Americans and several thousand rebel troops evaded the German Army. The OSS mission in Slovakia was led by a South Carolina cotton magnate, Holt Green, and included a dozen OSS agents, 18 airmen, and an Associated Press correspondent Joe Morton. The Americans asked Gulovich to join them as their translator and guide as they sought to escape from German-occupied territory. Gulovich agreed and helped the Americans obtain provisions, shelter and intelligence as they moved through the Slovak countryside. Gulovich later recounted how she would concoct a cover story on entering a new village: "I would say I was looking for my brother or we had had to evacuate ... And depending on the answers, I would know whether to keep talking or say, 'thank you,' and move on. Ironically if someone was a communist, I knew I could trust them." On several occasions, Gulovich had confrontations with German soldiers, and one of the OSS agents later recalled that "she got by through wit and guile" and her ability to speak German.

As the Americans sought to evade capture, an elite German intelligence unit was sent to the area to track them down. According to one historical account, "SS units prowled the countryside, executing whole villages of suspected partisan sympathizers and families sheltering Jews while looking for the Allied mission."

As the winter arrived, Gulovich and the Americans were caught in a blizzard on Mt. Ďumbier, the highest mountain in the Low Tatra range in central Slovakia. She later recalled that "the wind blew so hard that it turned people over. Our eyebrows and hair changed into bunches of icicles." They kept moving forward, passing 83 partisans who had been frozen stiff on the mountain.

In late December 1944, Gulovich and the Americans stayed at a hunting lodge for two weeks. The group had planned to leave the lodge on Christmas Day, but stayed an extra day waiting for an overdue airdrop of provisions. On December 26, 1944, Gulovich and four others from the group (two American and two British) left the lodge seeking food and medical supplies. While they were gone, the Germans raided the hunting lodge. The Americans were captured and later executed.

Gulovich and the four others who were away from the lodge avoided capture. It took the five of them nine more weeks to get to the Eastern front lines. She recalled that they never felt safe for a minute. To avoid capture, they often moved each night to new locations, including a mine and a barn, and suffered through lice and frostbite. Gulovich's foot became seriously frostbitten, but she declined to seek medical attention. She later explained her rationale for avoiding hospitals: "It never occurred to me to go, because I knew I would never come out. The Germans had my number. I thought, better to die on my feet than in a concentration camp."

Gulovich arrived in Bucharest on March 1, 1945, and was flown to OSS headquarters in Italy. She was put "on Army status" so that she could be paid for her service. She was later assigned to Prague as an interpreter, where she met Allen Dulles, an OSS officer who later became the director of the Central Intelligence Agency.

To reward her for her service, Dulles and OSS chief William Donovan arranged for Gulovich to immigrate to the United States with a scholarship to Vassar College. She recalled that she felt out of place at Vassar and was astonished by the waste of food she saw there: "My first night there, I broke down and cried when I saw the food they were throwing out. I saw in my mind the millions of hungry, starving people -- my family included."

In 1946, Donovan personally awarded Gulovich with the Bronze Star at a ceremony held at the U.S. Military Academy at West Point, New York.

In September 1946, the Los Angeles Times published an article about Gulovich's work with the OSS. The Times wrote: "Vivacious Maria Gulovich, 25, Czechoslovak schoolteacher who arrived here yesterday, is the essence of what fictionalized women spies should look like."

Gulovich became an American citizen in 1952 and moved to Oxnard, California and worked for many years as a real estate agent in Ventura County, California. She was married twice and had two children, Edmund E. Peck and Lynn S. Peck, with her first husband, attorney Eugene C. Peck. She later married Hans P. Liu. She had one granddaughter, Elisabeth Maria Peck.

In 1989, Gulovich and other women who had served the OSS were honored with a black-tie dinner for "The Ladies of the OSS" in Washington, D.C. Gulovich was interviewed by a reporter for The Washington Post at the time of the event and was the subject of a feature that drew attention to her story.
