= Charlotte Turgeon =

American chef and author (1912–2009)

Charlotte Snyder Turgeon (21 June 1912 – 22 September 2009) was an American chef and author. She translated and edited the first English-language version of the Larousse Gastronomique.

Turgeon was a graduate of Smith College and classmate of fellow French chef Julia Child.

Her notable works include:

- Creative International Cookbook ISBN 0-517-34921-3
- Creative Cooking Course ISBN 0-517-17250-X
- The Encyclopedia of Creative Cooking ISBN 0-517-30972-6
- The Tante Marie's Cooking School Cookbook ISBN 0-7432-1491-9
