= Joseph Morton (correspondent) =

American journalist and war correspondent (1911–1945)

- Born: June 30, 1911; St. Joseph, Missouri, United States
- Died: January 24, 1945; Mauthausen-Gusen concentration camp, Upper Austria
- Cause of death: Execution by shooting
- Occupation: War correspondent
- Employer: Associated Press
- Children: One (5 month old girl by the time of Joseph's death)

Joseph Morton (June 30, 1911 – January 24, 1945) was an American war correspondent for the Associated Press (AP) in the European Theater during World War II. On December 26, 1944, a Nazi counter-partisan unit named "Edelweiss" stormed a log cabin high on Homolka Mountain in today's Slovakia which housed 15 Allied intelligence officers, a Slovak officer, a Slovak-American interpreter, two Slovak civilian resistance fighters, and Morton himself, covering an OSS operation in the country for a story. Although the Allied officers were duly uniformed and Morton had a war correspondent ID in order to be treated as prisoners of war according to the Geneva Convention (1929), the SS headquarters, in compliance with the Commando Order—which stated that all Allied commandos should be killed immediately without trial, even those in proper uniforms—ordered the summary execution of Allied officers and others caught in the act. On January 24, 1945, Joseph Morton, along with 13 Allied officers, was executed at the Mauthausen-Gusen concentration camp. He was the only Allied correspondent to be executed by the Axis during World War II.

== Career ==
Joseph Morton joined the Associated Press (AP) at Lincoln, Nebraska, in 1937. He worked in AP bureaus in Lincoln, Omaha, Cleveland, and New York then was assigned to be a war correspondent in May 1942 overseas. He covered French West Africa, Algeria, and the Allied Air Forces in North Africa during the North African Campaign and eventually the invasion of Sicily. In April 1944, Joseph Morton conducted a written interview with Josip Broz Tito who wrote a 1,600 letter response to Morton's initial inquiries. However, this interview was initially censored by the Allied Force Headquarters in Algiers. Eventually, the Tito interview was published on May 21. Following the fall of Rome on June 1, 1944, Morton was encouraged by the AP to expand his coverage in the Balkans. He became the first American correspondent to report the entry of Soviet troops into Bucharest and obtained an exclusive interview with King Mihai on September 7, 1944. He also followed the OSS and the 15th USAAF in three secret missions in the Balkans to cover the rescue of American aircrews and the support of anti-Nazi partisans. Morton was remembered by some officers as "gentle, ever smiling Joe" although his charm and friendly character disguised an aggressive reporter who would go anywhere and do anything for a story.

== Joining the mission ==
In the summer of 1944, the OSS, British SOE, and the 15th USAAF in Bari teamed up to land agents in Slovakia to expedite the rescue of Allied aircrew shot down in Slovakia. These were to be the first OSS units to operate in central Europe. In July 1944, Moscow reluctantly approved a U.S. military mission to fly into German-occupied Czechoslovakia to evacuate a number of downed Allied aviators being harbored by British intelligence units and Slovak partisans. The mission became the OSS cover story to support a Slovak partisan uprising against Nazi rule with guns, ammunition, and sabotage, while gathering military intelligence deep inside Hitler's occupied Europe. Planning for operations into Slovakia was soon underway. A team of OSS agents, led by Navy Lt. Holt Green, formed the Dawes mission in response to the Slovak National Uprising, a Slovak resistance movement launched against the Nazis in August 1944. They also recruited 23-year-old Maria Gulovich as a translator since she was a Slovak schoolteacher that worked with the underground Slovak resistance and had spoken five languages including Russian, Hungarian, Slovak, German, and a little English. After rescuing 14 American and two Australian aviators on September 17, 1944, in Slovakia, and due to the bad weather, the next rescue and supply mission for the Dawes team was delayed until October 7, 1944, that continued on rescuing downed Allied aviators in the country and assisting the Slovak resistance against the Nazis. Green, while stationing in a rebel capital of Banská Bystrica, Slovakia, reported to the OSS headquarters in Bari that the German Army offensive was closing in and "would probably be successful. Situation here is considered hopeless." Green advised against sending in more agents to the rebel capital which was ignored by Bari.

Joe Morton had heard of an intelligence mission slated to begin on October 7 and persuaded the Dawes team to let him join them. Since Morton was a popular reporter and had earlier flown with the 15th USAAF and also accompanied the OSS team into Bucharest in August led by his friend, Major Walter Ross, OSS Chief of Special Operations, who was also going with the Dawes team on the morning of October 7, the OSS agents agreed to let them join the secret mission. This time, six B-17s would fly the mission with OSS and SOE agents bringing in tons of arms and ammunition for the partisans. Before leaving Bari, Morton sent a message to the AP, saying that he was leaving to cover the "greatest story of his life." After landing on an airport in Banská Bystrica where the areas was occupied by partisans and 28 American and two New Zealand fliers were brought aboard the planes that morning, Joe Morton asked Ross to take his story of the airmen's rescue story back to Italy which Ross agreed. Unfortunately, the censors snatched his story for being too revealing and never passed on to the AP. The outside world never heard from him directly again.

=== Retreating from the Nazis ===
As the Germans advanced on the rebel capital, Green requested to send most of the Dawes team, including journalist Morton, back to Italy but bad weather prevented the 15th USAAF from taking them back, although every night the Russians were flying dozens of C-47s out of Tri Duby. The Russians promised to fly the Americans out as well but the Russian flights stopped suddenly. The uprising against the Nazis in Slovakia faltered and on October 27, the Nazis entered Banská Bystrica. Realizing that escaping into the hills was the only option left, Joe Morton, Lt. Holt Green, and the Dawes team, joined long columns of soldiers, partisans, and civilians fleeing into the mountains while encountering German planes strafing and bombing, artillery fire, as well as German units with dogs in hot pursuit. Many partisans died in the grueling march due to the bad weather. While enduring the march, Joe became friends with Maria Gulovich. Maria said that Joe shared his sulfa powder with her. "Many times others could walk much better than we did, so we kind of stayed together," Gulovich said. "That powder helped....our wounds started healing after application."

On December 14, Morton, the Dawes men, and Maria reached and hid in the Homolka cabin above the village of Polomka in the mountains as the blizzard closed in. Eleven days on, the officers celebrated Christmas by singing carols and enjoying a ham that young Slovak partisan Rudolf Hruska had carried up from the village.

=== Capture ===
On the early morning of December 25, Gulovich made a decision that saved her life. She, along with two American and two British fugitives, took off for a mountain hotel, another partisan hideout some two hours away, seeking food and shelter and medical supplies at a resort hotel farther up the mountain. Gulovich said that the Associated Press reporter Joe Morton "walked with us half an hour or longer, and then he said, "Well, I have to go back" and we hugged. She also recalled that, "Joe wore a hat, a green knitted cap. I turned back after he left me. I can see it even now. He was walking alone with that green hat on top of his head."

The next morning, a 300-man strong Nazi counter-partisan named "Edelweiss", under Commander Ladislav Niznansky, stormed and surrounded the cabin. Morton, who was wearing an American uniform, and the others were captured in the act. Morton's translator Josef Piontek, wrote in his diary that he watched the Nazis burn down the cabin and the flames swallowing a thick stack of notes belonging to Morton who he noted "fed on the news more than on food."

=== Death ===
On January 7, 1945, Morton, 12 American OSS agents, including Lt. Holt Green, leader of the Dawes team, and four British SOE agents were taken to the Mauthausen concentration camps run by Standartenführer commandant Franz Ziereis, in Austria 15 miles (24 kilometers) from Linz. At the time, Mauthausen was the fifth largest of the Nazi extermination camps. Two Gestapo officers, Werner Mueller (one of Berlin's best linguists) and Dr. Hans Thost (an interceptor for the Reich Security Main Office) were ordered to go to Mauthausen to interrogate a group of English and American officers who had been taken prisoner in the sector held by Slovak rebels.

Thost testified after the war that Ziereis got an intense pleasure of torturing the prisoners of war for information. A civilian translator at the camp later reported that Morton was questioned but not tortured. Morton made clear that he was not a soldier or officially part of the intelligence group, even showing the Germans his war correspondent insignia or ID to prove that he was a journalist. Along with the duly uniformed Allied officers, he and others should have been treated as prisoners of war according to the Geneva Convention (1929). However, the Germans saw little to no difference between spies and journalists and following a telegram from SS General Ernst Kaltenbrunner ordering the execution in implementation of Hitler's secret Commando Order of 1942, Morton and 13 Allied intelligence agents were led separately into the execution bunker to face a fake camera and told they would be photographed. An SS guard then stepped forward and shot each man in the nape of the neck. All were executed at Mauthausen in the presence of Franz Ziereis and camp chief Adolf Zutter on orders from SS General Ernst Kaltenbrunner.

After the war, Kaltenbrunner was tried in Nuremberg and executed as a war criminal. Ziereis and Zutter were both arrested by U.S. soldiers after the liberation of Mauthausen. Ziereis was fatally shot during an escape attempt, whereas Zutter was tried in Mauthausen trial, sentenced to death, and executed in 1947.

Morton was the only American and Allied correspondent to be executed by the Axis during World War II. Morton left behind his wife, Letty Morton, and a 5-month-old daughter, Melinda Ann (now renamed Mimi Gosney), at the time of his death.

== Morton's fate ==
Morton's colleagues from AP and his family had no clue to his whereabouts. The AP maintained strict silence about his disappearance in order to not jeopardize his safety if he had survived. However, London received an alarming news from a German radio that said 17 Anglo-American agents who had been captured in Slovakia had been tried by a military tribunal and executed by shooting on January 24, 1945, that same day. In April 1945, the first information leading to Morton's fate when a German interpreter was captured and interrogated by the OSS. Finally, in June 1945, a month after the liberation of Mauthausen camp by Patton's Third U.S. Army, AP's correspondent and Morton's friend Lynne Hientzerling was allowed to fly to Mauthausen to investigate, including the interview of a Polish prisoner, Wilhelm Ornstein. On July 9, 1945, the investigation by the AP stated that Morton was indeed executed by the Germans on January 24, 1945, and also found that there were no evidence of any trials for Morton and the Dawes men before their execution.

== Legacy ==
Years later, declassified U.S. government files claimed that the OSS had no idea Morton would be aboard the aircraft flying the rescue mission to Slovakia for downed airmen. The file noted that Morton had no clandestine training and that he was actually a guest of the 15th USAAF, not the OSS, and also mentioned that he intended to leave Slovakia when the aircraft returned to Italy, but on the arrival at Banská Bystrica, he changed his mind. However, the OSS files stated that Morton told OSS agents he had elected to wait for the next incoming aircraft. Both the OSS and 15th USAAF denied approving Morton's trip and continued to point fingers at each other.

On July 17, 1945, Morton's wife Letty wrote a letter to AP General Manager Kent Cooper in response to a letter of condolence:

That it was intended to be an assignment into eternity was unknown to Joe when he messaged the AP to cover the 'greatest story of his life.' He was eager to go and the recent reports state that his enthusiasm did not wane throughout the bleak moments. Joe always championed the underprivileged—the little man who was not getting his due in the world. From early days when he had a pop stand on the curb and gave away the pop to thirsty children who had no nickels, to his last days when he joined the partisans to right the grievous wrong inflicted upon Slovakia. He was living his credo to help the man who was battling against odds.

I cannot end this letter without writing of Joe's deep love for the Associated Press. Its name was synonymous with the best reporting and it was always with pride that Joe said, 'I am with the AP.' I am proud that Joe contributed to the history of AP. I do not profess to understand why he had to be taken from us. My heart will always ask and always long for him. Some day I hope that we may read the stories which Lynn had heard Joe buried when the Germans were near at hand.
