= Christos Vartzakis =

Greek marathon runner

Christos Vartzakis (1911 – 7 September 2009) was a Greek marathon runner. He won the Greek Championship in 1948 and 1953.

Between the ages of 36 and 79, Vartzakis participated in a university study on the effects of ageing on performance. The study showed that his average speed decreased by 30% over a period of 43 years.
