= Alimsultan Alkhamatov =

Russian politician (1965–2009)

- Born: c. 1965
- Died: 27 September 2009 (aged 44); Moscow

Alimsultan Alkhamatov (c. 1965 – 27 September 2009) was a Russian politician and official from Dagestan. He was an ethnic Kumyk.

== Career ==
Alkhamatov was named acting Khasavyurt district head in 2005. His term lasted until 27 September 2009 when he was killed in Moscow.

== Assassination ==
Alkhamatov went to Moscow to be with his 19-year-old son, who was undergoing another operation for injuries due to a car accident. He was shot and killed in southwest Moscow on 27 September 2009. The attack also left his driver seriously wounded. His assassination follows a string of high-profile killings in Dagestan, Chechnya and Ingushetia in 2009.

Alkhamatov, who was 44 years old, was reportedly the target of three prior assassination attempts. Because of these, he had three armed bodyguards and armored Mercedes while in Moscow, but the security measures to protect him ultimately failed. The first assassination attempt against him occurred at the beginning of 2005, shortly after the then Dagestani President Magomedali Magomedov appointed him acting Khasavyurt district head.
