= Mikhail Mukasei =

Soviet spy

- Михаил Мукасей
- Born: 13 August 1907; Zamostsye, Minsk Governorate, Russian Empire (now Slutsk Raion, Minsk Oblast, Belarus)
- Died: 19 August 2008 (aged 101); Moscow, Russia
- Known for: Espionage
- Spouse: Elizaveta Ivanovna Mukasei
- Children: 2

Mikhail Isaakovich Mukasei (Russian: Михаил Исаакович Мукасей; 13 August 1907 – 19 August 2008) was a Soviet spy codenamed Zephyr.

== Biography ==
The son of a Jewish blacksmith, when Mukasei was 18 he started studying at the Institute of Oriental Languages in Leningrad, specializing in Bengali and English. In 1937 he was ordered by the Communist Party of the Soviet Union to study at the Intelligence School of the Workers' and Peasants' Red Army.

In 1939, he and his wife Elizaveta (née Emelianov, 1912–2009) and their two children, moved to Los Angeles and began gathering military intelligence. Mukasei's parents and other members of his family were killed by the Germans. In 1943, Mukasei, his wife and children returned to Moscow and he was appointed deputy head of the Intelligence School.

From the 1940s through the 1970s, Mukasei, along with his wife Elizaveta (codenamed Elza), took part in a number of undercover operations in Western Europe and the United States.

Assigned to the Soviet diplomatic staff in the United States during the Second World War as vice consul in Los Angeles, Mukasei made use of his position to gather information on any threats to the Soviet Union posed by Imperial Japan. He continued his work in an undisclosed country in Western Europe from the 1950s to the late 1970s.

In 1977, Mukasei and his family returned to Moscow and began training spies. He wrote training manuals for reconnaissance work and was a professor at the Russian Academy of Security, Defense and Law Enforcement. In December 2004, Mukasei published a book of their memoirs called Zephyr and Elsa in which they wrote about their thirty years of work and life abroad. In the post-Soviet period, he was honored for his "outstanding contribution to ensuring the security of the Russian Federation".
