= Suicide of Bill Sparkman =

Suicide of an American teacher

Bill Sparkman
- Sparkman graduating from Western Governors University
- Born: August 12, 1958; Mulberry, Florida
- Died: September 12, 2009 (aged 51); Clay County, Kentucky
- Known for: United States Census worker discovered dead under initially mysterious circumstances.
- Children: 1

William Edwin "Bill" Sparkman Jr. (August 12, 1958 – September 12, 2009) was an American schoolteacher and Field Representative for the United States Census Bureau found dead in September 2009 under suspicious circumstances. After more than two months of investigation, police concluded that his death was a suicide, staged by him to look like a homicide, so that his family could collect life insurance.

== Biographical details ==
Sparkman was raised in Mulberry, Florida, the oldest of three sons of a high school principal and a furniture company executive. Sparkman was an altar boy as a child. In high school, he wrote for the local weekly newspaper, The Mulberry Press, and was the football team manager. An Eagle Scout, he worked for the Boy Scouts of America as an adult, overseeing the programs in Polk and Hillsborough counties. This work later took him to Atlanta, Georgia, then London, Kentucky in 1993.

Once in Kentucky, he raised his adopted son alone, joined a local Methodist Church, and worked for nine years at an elementary school as a volunteer and instructional assistant. In 2005, Sparkman began part-time work with the United States Census Bureau, and studied education with Western Governors University, an online college. In 2007, after receiving medical treatment for an ingrown toe nail, Sparkman's doctor identified a cyst, which led to his diagnosis of Stage-3 non-Hodgkin's lymphoma cancer. He continued teaching while receiving chemotherapy treatments from November 2007 to March 2008, during which time he completed his academic coursework, and was invited to speak at the commencement ceremony at Western Governors University in Salt Lake City, Utah. After graduation, he pursued a position as a middle school math teacher.

== Discovery of the body ==
On September 12, 2009, Sparkman's body was discovered by attendees of a family reunion who had been paying a visit to Hoskins Cemetery in rural Clay County, Kentucky, within Daniel Boone National Forest. He had been reported missing from work three days earlier while working on the American Community Survey for the U.S. Census, which covered a local five-county area. Sparkman was reportedly found with a rope around his neck, tied to a tree while in contact with the ground, wearing only socks, and with the word "fed" written on his chest in felt-tip marker. It was reported in the media that the word had been written upside-down, or from an upside-down point of view. The orientation of how the text was written led the police to the eventual conclusion that Sparkman had written “fed” himself. Additionally, his census ID was taped to the side of his neck. He was gagged, with duct tape around his hands and feet, and over his mouth and eyes. Kentucky State Police criticized many media reports of the death, such as ones that asserted that he was hanging from a tree, when he was actually tied to a tree with a rope around his neck.

== Cause of death ==
Authorities eventually determined that Sparkman's death was a suicide, staged to look like a homicide. Initially, police said that Sparkman's death was not natural, but hadn't ruled whether it was a homicide, a suicide, or an accident. After an investigation by the Kentucky State Police that lasted more than two weeks, Sparkman's 19-year-old son, Josh Sparkman, expressed frustration, and called it “disrespectful” that the possibilities of a suicide or accident were still being considered. In the ensuing days, Sparkman's son further asserted that he was certain the death was a homicide, noting his father's truck had been “ransacked” with items stolen, which included Sparkman's census laptop and a family wedding ring—items not discovered by investigators.

Preliminary findings of the local coroner indicated Sparkman died from asphyxiation, and the Census Bureau's regional office in Charlotte, North Carolina said law enforcement called it “an apparent homicide.” On October 6, Sparkman's body was released to his family, but the State Medical Examiner's Office stated it had not yet resolved the case. It had only established the cause of death—not the manner of death—and investigators were still learning “bits and pieces of information.” The Kentucky State Police agreed that the case was “perplexing.” The Los Angeles Times reported that “the case so far is notable for the lack of details divulged by law enforcement officials.” In late October, officials reported that the case was close to being resolved, and that they had been careful in “not rushing a decision.” John Berry, director of the Office of Personnel Management, proclaimed his resolve to “come down on these perpetrators as hell hath no fury.”

On November 23, investigators declared the death as officially a suicide. According to reports, Sparkman, who had previously battled non-Hodgkin's lymphoma, was suspected to have believed his cancer had returned, and had taken out life insurance policies totalling $600,000 just prior to his death. The insurance policies would have been paid to his financially struggling son in the event of death, but would not pay out in the circumstances of suicide or death from cancer.

== Census impact ==
On October 11, Regional Director Wayne Hatcher of the Census Bureau's Charlotte, N.C. regional office, which has jurisdiction over a five-state area that includes Kentucky, held a small memorial service at the cemetery in Clay County. He said other employees had reacted to the death by requesting to work in teams during census gathering. While law enforcement conducted its investigation of the death, the United States Census Bureau suspended its work in Clay County.

== Media reaction ==
Because of Sparkman's status as a Federal Census Bureau worker, in addition to the word “fed” written on his body, the incident drew national attention. On MSNBC's The Rachel Maddow Show, Maddow speculated that a dislike among area residents of the U.S. federal government may have contributed to Sparkman's death. Some scholars disagreed, saying there wasn't “an outpouring of anti-government sentiment in the region,” and that “distrust of government” in the area is comparable to the rest of the country. However, an Associated Press report stated the area “[had] a reputation for mistrusting government, dating back to the days of moonshiners and 'revenuers,'” and that it is a top marijuana producer, where federal agents have held drug and corruption raids numerous times. Among those locally convicted for drug and corruption charges were: a former mayor, former city councilmen, an assistant police chief, a county clerk, a magistrate, and an election commissioner. Other city officials, such as the county's school superintendent and the circuit court judge, were indicted for voter fraud in March 2009. The Christian Science Monitor also reported on possible connections to nearby drug activities and anti-government motives. Clay County is one of the poorest counties in the United States, and residents feared the incident would add to its negative stereotype, despite progress in education and efforts against crime.

Some suggested Sparkman's death may have been related to controversies over the upcoming 2010 federal census. Earlier in 2009, several leading conservatives and Republican political figures spoke out against ACORN's involvement in census surveys, and boycotted it over concerns that the census could be used against citizens. Some libertarians faulted the census for contributing to the expanding government, and Latino activists boycotted it to push for immigration reform. The Los Angeles Times reported that in the absence of public findings by investigators, some writers in the liberal blogosphere concluded that the death was the result of anti-government rhetoric during the presidency of Barack Obama.

The Kentucky State Police, who conducted the investigation, noted that there had been widespread misinformation and speculation from the media coverage of the incident. Robert Stivers, the Republican state senator from Clay County, said Sparkman's death had been “sensationalized” because of his status as a federal census worker. In late October, the KSP commander in charge of the case said baseless media speculation “[had] been a detriment to the investigation,” since investigators were required to examine those claims.

On December 11, an episode of the TV show Law & Order titled “FED” featured a murder victim based on Sparkman, found shirtless with the word “FED” written on his chest. However, this victim was a conservative campaign employee who was plotting against an ACORN-like organization.

== Family reaction ==
Sparkman's son, Josh, was adamant that his father did not die by suicide. He said a man who fought cancer for as long as Sparkman had would not take his own life, after showing the resolve to live every day.
