= Lori Mai =

American singer

Lori Ann Duque Mai
- Born: Lori Ann Duque; November 16, 1977; Dallas, Texas United States
- Died: September 16, 2009 (aged 31) Mission, Texas, United States
- Genres: Folk, rock, jazz
- Occupations: Singer, composer
- Instrument: Vocals
- Years active: 2007–09
- Label: Music 2 Gold
- Website: www.Music 2 Gold.com/Lori Mai

Lori Ann Duque Mai (November 16, 1977 – September 16, 2009) was a German–American folk rock singer and musician.

== Early life ==
Mai was born in Dallas, Texas to American parents. She grew up in Cooper City, Florida, a suburb of Fort Lauderdale with her mother, Carolyn Cooper Stoner, her sister, Lisa Zilinski Mounteer and stepfather, Marvin E Stoner, Jr. a Broward County Sheriff Deputy Chief. In 1990, she moved to Mission, Texas to live with her father Joe Duque for a couple of years, moved back to Florida and then in 1999 moved to Berlin.

== Music career ==
In February 2008, Mai was a candidate of the casting television show, Deutschland sucht den Superstar. She performed from a motorized wheelchair because she was diagnosed with amyotrophic lateral sclerosis (ALS). Later, she acquired a record deal with Music 2 Gold and produced her first and only album, Be What I Am, released on May 9, 2008.

== Personal life ==
Mai was married and had two children, Alenka and Anuschka, whom she had lived with during her residence in both Estenfeld and Berlin.

== Discography ==
Albums

- Be What I Am (2008)

Singles

- Killing Me Softly (2008)
- My Promise (2008)

== Death ==
Mai died on September 16, 2009, in Mission, Texas, from complications due to amyotrophic lateral sclerosis.
