= Carole Pegg =

British folksinger, fiddle player and ethnomusicologist

Carole Pegg, sometimes Carolanne Pegg, is a British folksinger and fiddle player, and an anthropologist of music (ethnomusicologist).

In 1970 Pegg and her husband Bob formed British folk rock band Mr. Fox. Writing their own songs that drew on traditional English themes, it was the first folk-rock band to use traditional English instrumental sounds. Carole learned from traditional fiddlers and her fiddle-singing technique has now become standard among folk performers. After divorcing Bob Pegg, in 1973 she released a solo album with Transatlantic Records, and briefly performed with Graham Bond and Pete Macbeth as Magus.

Having trained as a social anthropologist at Cambridge University, Carole Pegg was awarded a doctorate there for her work on the music of East Suffolk. This was followed by postdoctoral research in Mongolia that inspired the first book written in English on Mongolian music. Becoming a classic, it established her as an international expert on that subject. She spent a further 20 years doing fieldwork in the republics of Altai, Khakassia and Tyva in southern Siberia. Her second book: Drones, Tones, & Timbres: Sounding Place among Nomads of the Inner Asian Mountain-Steppes, is in press (University of Illinois Press, with web companion, 9 Jan 2024). She served as Chairperson of the International Council for Traditional Music (UK Branch) and was a founding co-editor of its journal, the 'British Journal of Ethnomusicology', now 'Ethnomusicology Forum'. In reciprocity for help during fieldwork in Mongolia and the Altai-Sayan region, she formed the agency Inner Asian Music, toured musicians from those places, and published CDs of the Khakas musician and instrument maker Sergei Charkov and his daughter Yulia, and Tuvan master musician, wild fiddler and throat-singer, Radik Tülüsh (Ru. Tyulyush). In 2014, she raised money from the British Council to record in England with Radik and released their collaborative album "Goshawk".

== Discography ==
Albums

- Carolanne Pegg (Transatlantic, 1973)

== Publications ==
- Mongolian Music, Dance, and Oral Narrative: Performing Diverse Identities (Seattle and London: University of Washington Press, 2001).
- Drones, Tones, and Timbres: Sounding Place among Nomads of the Inner Asian Mountain-Steppes (Urbana, Chicago and Springfield, University of Illinois Press, 2024).
