= Jon Eydmann =

British music manager

- Born: 1968
- Died: 2 September 2009 (aged 40–41); Italy
- Occupations: Band manager and music executive

Jon Eydmann (1968 – 2 September 2009) was a British band manager and music executive.

During his career Eydmann managed several bands and musicians. In 1991 while managing the British garage band Spitfire until he met Brett Anderson, the lead singer of Suede. Eydmann remained their manager until Charlie Charlton took over. After he managed several other bands and was involved with several musicians through his Messy Lives Music.

Eydmann died on 2 September 2009 at the age of 41 while on holiday in Italy. Eydmann had hired a boat on Lake Como and suffered a suspected heart attack after he dived. Edymann died in hospital after spending two days on life support.
