= Richard D. Robinson (educator) =

American educator and author

Richard D. Robinson (1921 – September 5, 2009) was an American educator, author, journalist, and specialist in international management. He was a professor at the MIT Sloan School of Management, where he helped establish international business management as a field of study and later became professor emeritus.

== Early life and education ==
Robinson was born in Yakima, Washington, in 1921. He studied at the University of Washington, the Harvard Graduate School of Business, and the Massachusetts Institute of Technology, where he received a Ph.D. He also spent a year at the School of Oriental and African Studies in London, focusing on Turkish history, literature, language, and Islamic law.

== Korea and Turkey ==
At the close of World War II, Robinson was assigned to military intelligence in southern Korea. In November 1945, he arrived in Korea and served as officer-in-charge of the Office of Public Opinion in the United States Army Military Government in Korea (USAMGIK). In 1946, after leaving military service, he worked as a civilian historian on the official history of the U.S. occupation of southern Korea.

Robinson became critical of USAMGIK policy, especially its support for right-wing Korean political forces and its handling of the occupation. He published criticism of the occupation in the American press and began writing a book-length account, Betrayal of a Nation, based on his experiences and documentary sources. Facing investigation in 1947, he left Korea for Turkey, where he lived for nearly a decade and became a specialist on Turkish affairs.

== Academic career ==
After returning to the United States, Robinson worked in business education and joined the Massachusetts Institute of Technology. At MIT Sloan, he helped develop the study of international business management and wrote early textbooks in the field, including International Business Policy. He was also one of the founders of the Academy of International Business and is regarded by that organization as an early pioneer in international management teaching and research.

Robinson wrote sixteen books, edited or contributed to five others, and published numerous articles. His work addressed international business, management, culture, values, and relations between the United States and other regions, including Turkey and China.

== Later publication of Betrayal of a Nation ==
Robinson's manuscript Betrayal of a Nation, written after his experience in Korea, remained unpublished during his lifetime. In 2026 it was published in Witness to Korea 1945–47: The Unfolding of an Authoritarian Regime, edited by Frank Hoffmann and Mark E. Caprio. The volume also includes Mark Gayn's writings on Korea from Japan Diary and essays by the editors on the U.S. occupation of southern Korea, right-wing politics, and the early Cold War.

== Death ==
Robinson died on September 5, 2009, in Gig Harbor, Washington, at the age of 88.

== Selected works ==
- International Business Policy
- International Business Management: A Guide to Decision Making
- Betrayal of a Nation, published in Witness to Korea 1945–47: The Unfolding of an Authoritarian Regime (2026)
