= Jeffrey Wernick =

Jeffrey Wernick (1953 – September 2, 2009) was an American animation executive and sports agent.

Born in Brooklyn, Wernick studied at NYU law school after attending the State University at Buffalo. He worked for Donovan, Leisure and Irvine law firm until he joined DIC Animation City. Wernick oversaw the growth of DIC as COO of the company. He also represented the company in legal affairs and development in China.

Wernick also served as Vice President of basketball at Wasserman Media Group in 2006. He previously worked for Arn Tellem until he sold his business. During his time as a sports agent he represented basketball players such as Joe Johnson of the Atlanta Hawks and Mike Miller of the Washington Wizards.

Wernick died at the age of 56 on September 2, 2009.
