= Demuth Museum =

Art museum in Lancaster, Pennsylvania

Coordinates: 40.0381°N 76.3029°W

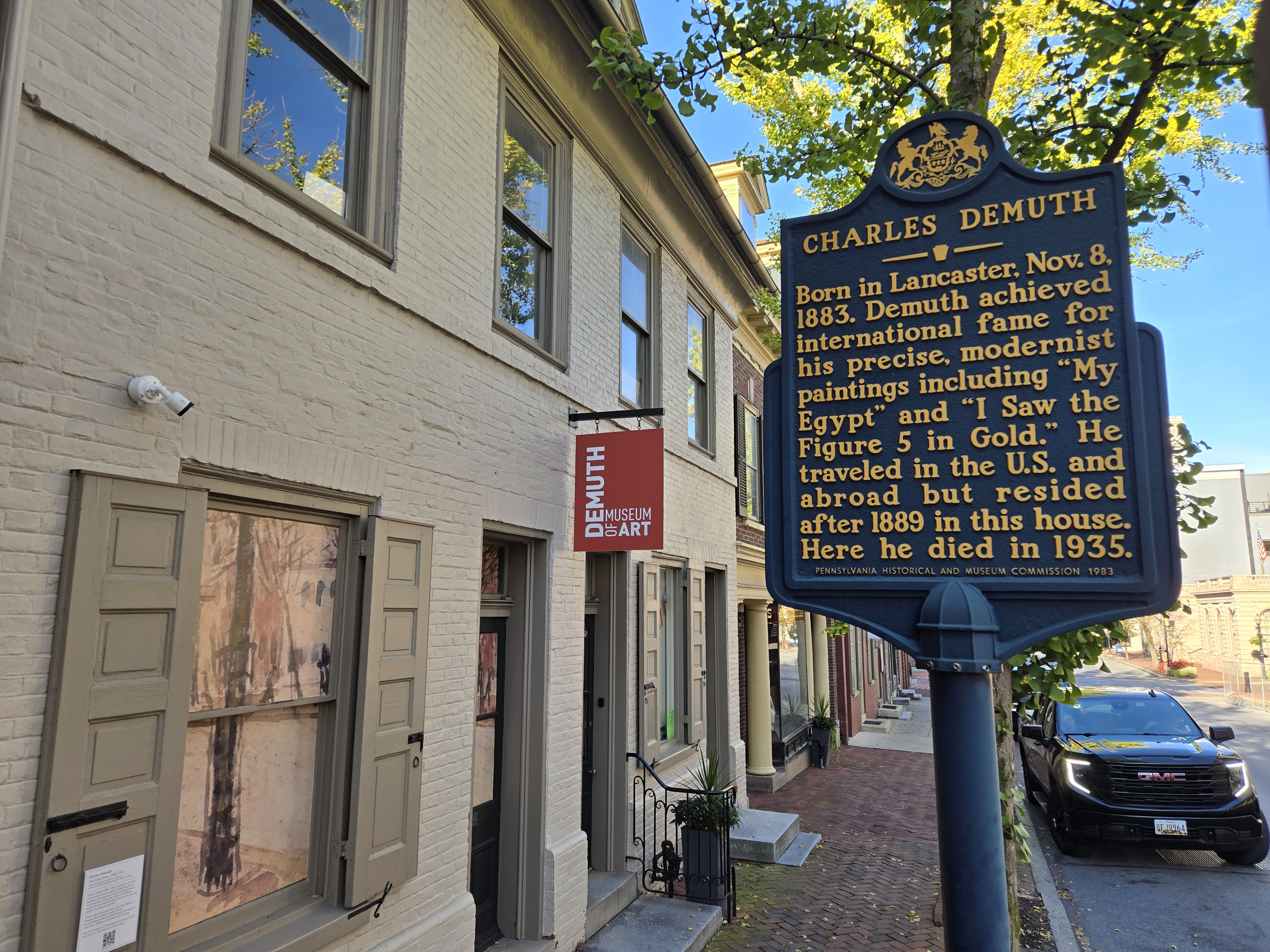
Charles Demuth's home and studio on King Street in Lancaster, PA, which is now the Demuth Museum of Art

Demuth Museum of Art in Lancaster, Pennsylvania, United States, is a museum dedicated to noted American Modernist painter Charles Demuth (1883–1935) located in his former studio and home at 120 East King Street. It is operated by the Demuth Foundation, which also has a building on Lime Street in the Grubb Mansion at Musser Part (formerly the Lancaster Museum of Art), which focuses on contemporary regional art. The Museum offers a rotating view of a permanent collection which includes about 60 Charles Demuth originals - the largest Demuth collection in the world - and 800 historical objects, including letters, documents, photographs, and family ephemera. The Museum grounds also include the family tobacco shop and snuff mill as well as a portion of the garden maintained by Demuth's mother, Augusta.

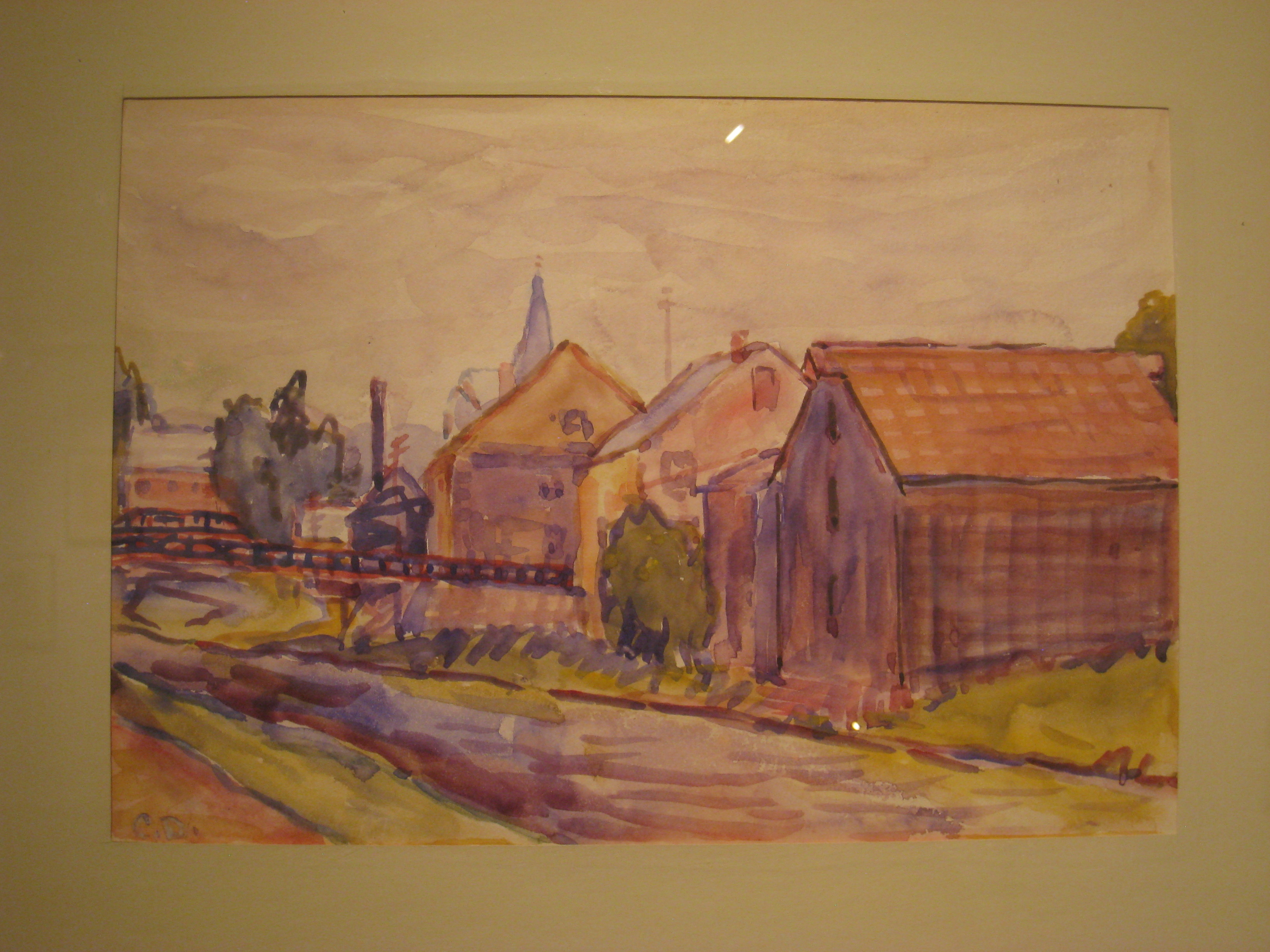
The Canal, New Hope, Pennsylvania on display at the museum

The double-width properties that include Demuth's home and the tobacco shop were built in 1750. They are a contributing property to the Lancaster Historic District. The Museum is a member of Historic Artists' Homes & Studios, a program of the National Trust for Historic Preservation.

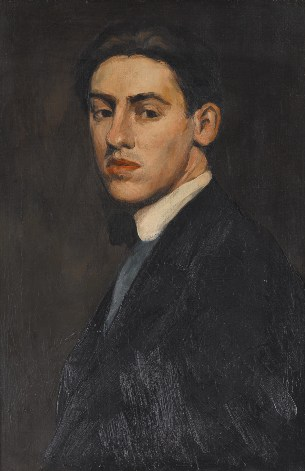
Self-Portrait, 1907, on display at the museum

In addition to 10,000 annual visitors, the museum is regarded as an education center for students, with programming and exhibition opportunities from primary through postsecondary, a research site for scholars, who access the archives and library for research purposes, and an enrichment location for adults, with workshops and classes, bus tours, and artist talks.

Admission is by donation.

== Rebranding ==
In June 2026, the Demuth Foundation announced a new name and logo for its museums. The Demuth Museum and the Lancaster Museum of Art, which were both operated by the Demuth Foundation since 2014, are now joined under one name: The Demuth Museum of Art.

== See also ==
- List of single-artist museums
