= Vijayawada =

Metropolis in Andhra Pradesh, India

Vijayawada Vijayawāḍa (Telugu) Bezawada
- Metropolis
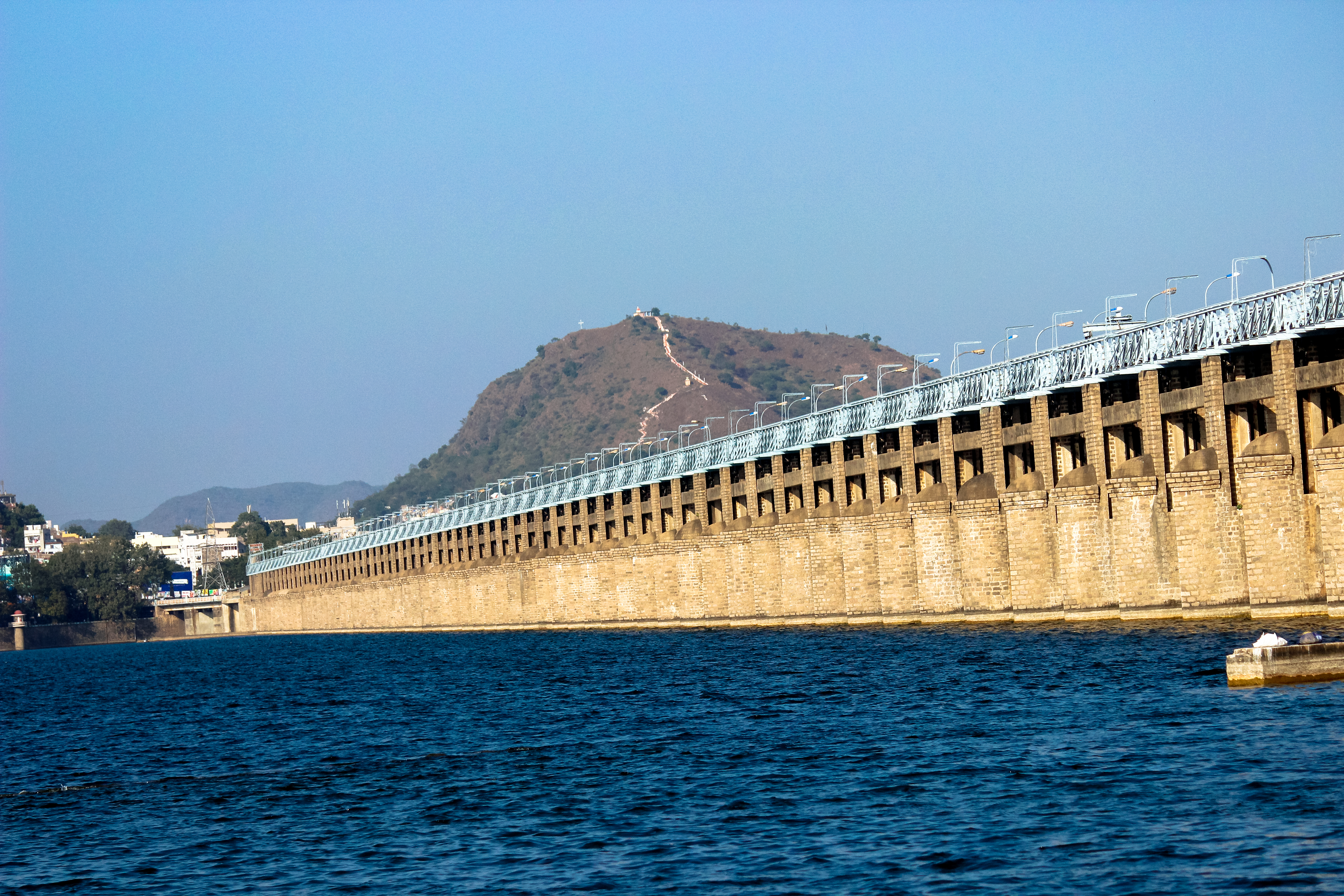
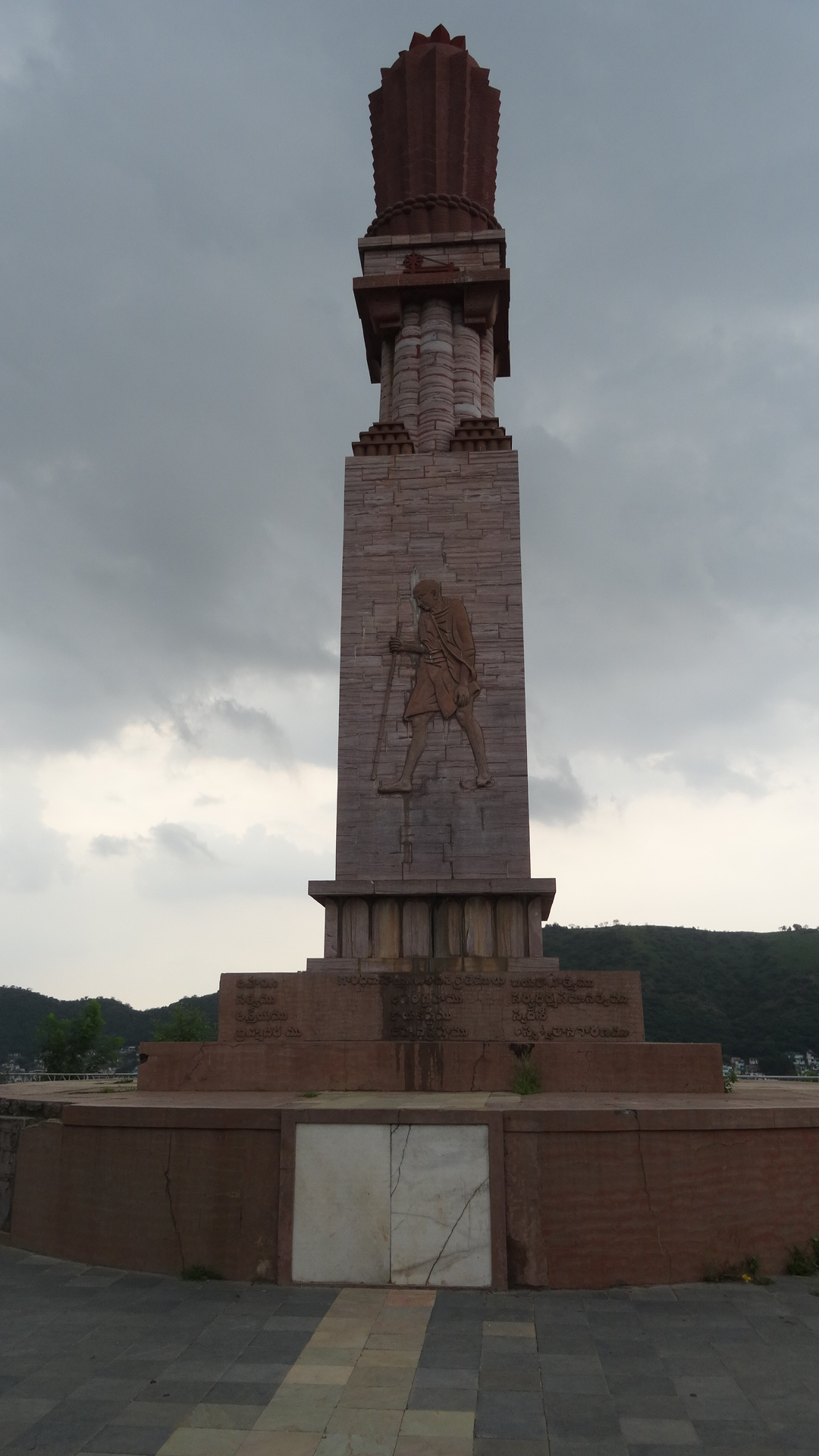
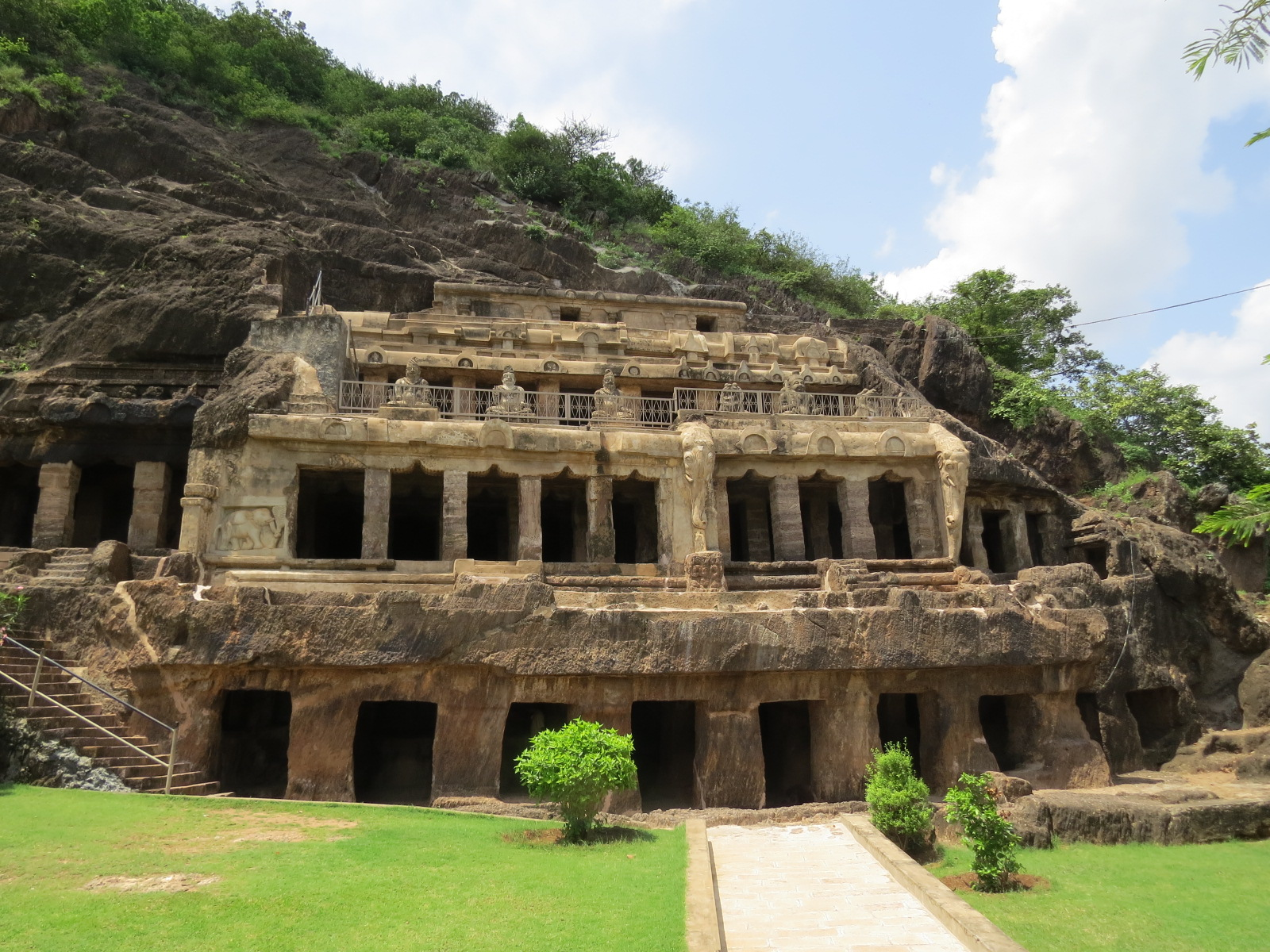
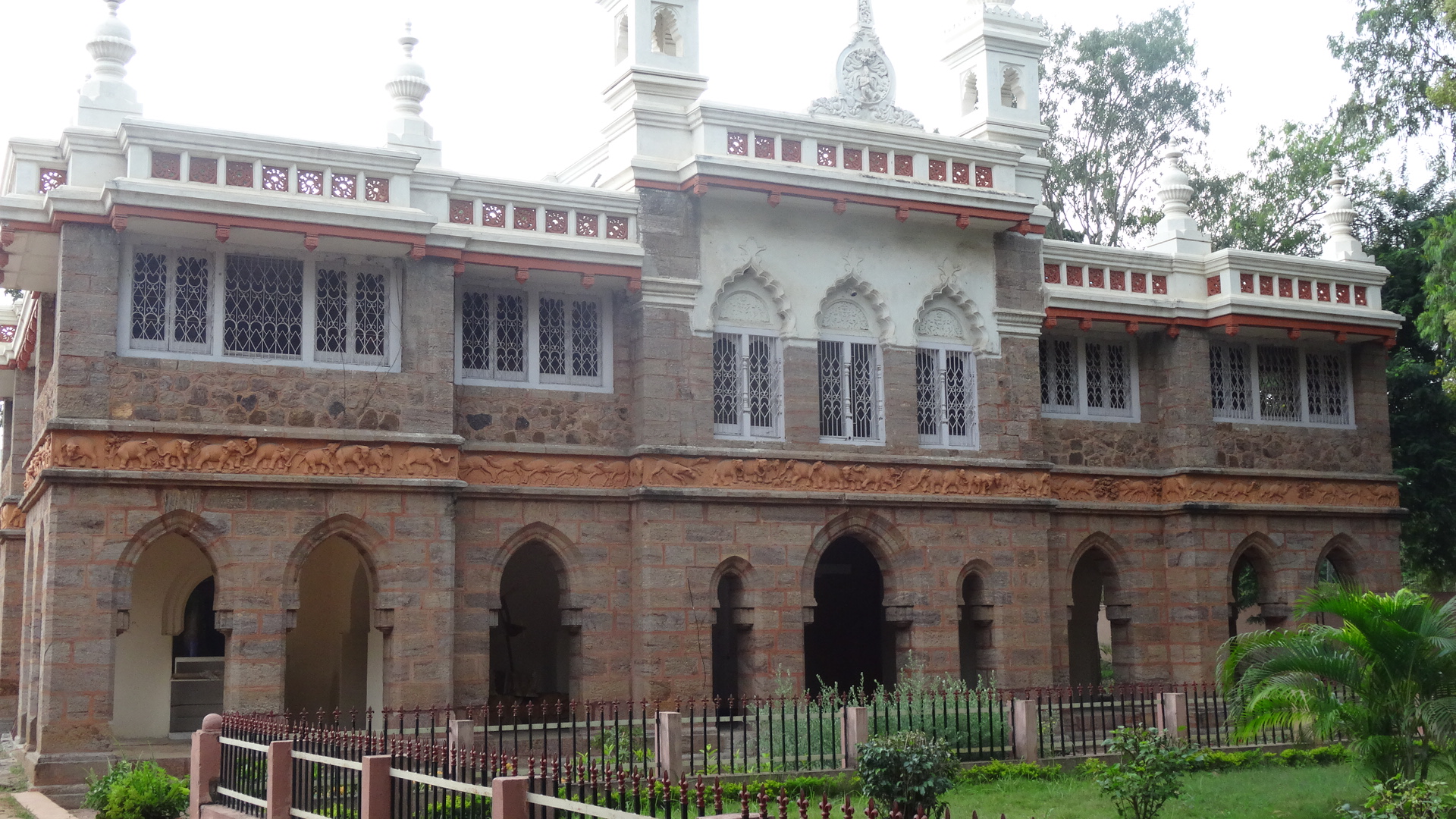
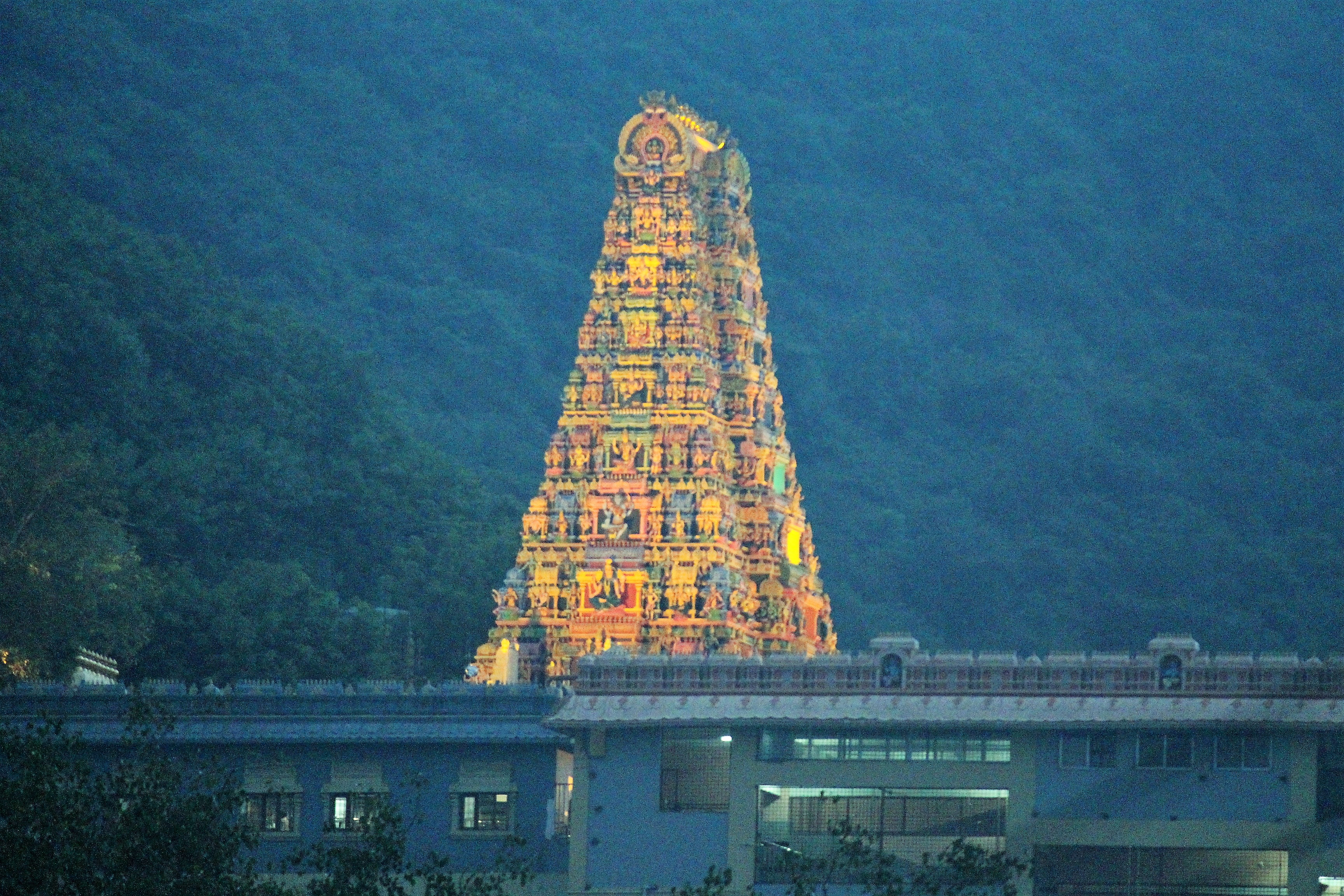
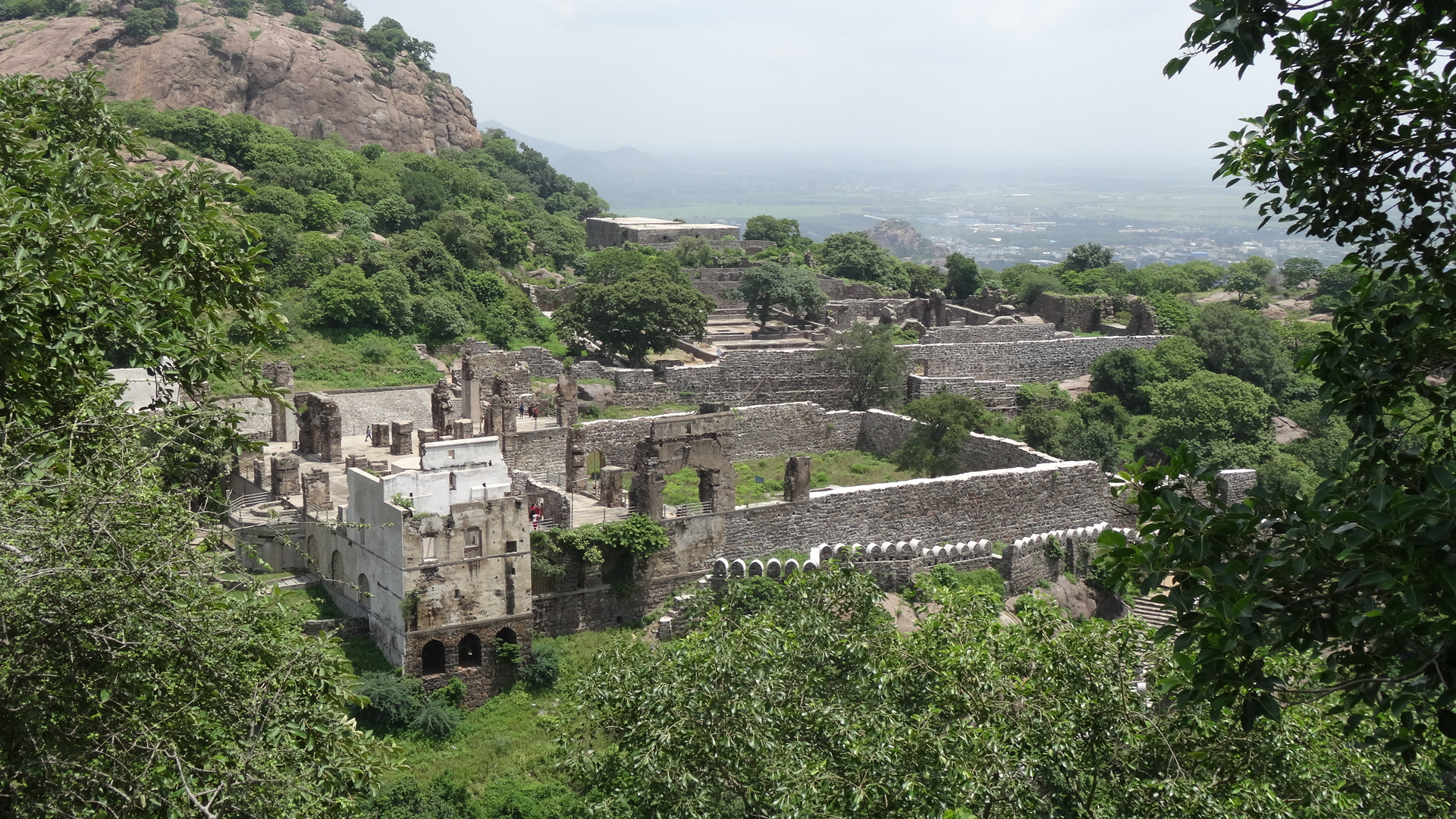
- Prakasam Barrage Gandhi Smaraka Stupam Undavalli Caves Bapu Museum Kanaka Durga Temple Kondapalli Fort
- Etymology: The Place of Victory
- Nickname: City of Victory
- Interactive map of Vijayawada
- Location in Andhra Pradesh Location in India Location in Asia Location on Earth
- Coordinates: 16.5144°N 80.6192°E
- Country: India
- State: Andhra Pradesh
- Region: Coastal Andhra
- District: NTR, Krishna,Guntur
- Incorporated (Municipality): 1 April 1888
- Incorporated (Corporation): 6 June 1981

Government
  - Type: Municipal Corporation
  - Body: Vijayawada Municipal Corporation (VMC); Andhra Pradesh Capital Region
  - Mayor: Vacant (since 18 March 2026)
  - Municipal Commissioner: Dhyanachandra H M, I.A.S
  - Member of Parliament: Kesineni Sivanath ((TDP))
  - Member of the Legislative Assembly: Bonda Umamaheswara Rao (TDP) – Vijayawada Central Assembly constituency; Gadde Ramamohan (TDP) – Vijayawada East Assembly constituency; Sujana Chowdary (BJP) – Vijayawada West Assembly constituency

Area
  - Urban: 283.58 km^{2} (109.49 sq mi)
  - Metro: 8,603.32 km^{2} (3,321.76 sq mi)
  - City: 61.88 km^{2} (23.89 sq mi)
- Elevation: 11 m (36 ft)

Population
  - Rank: 2nd (in Andhra Pradesh) and 27th in India
  - Urban: 1,230,000
  - Urban density: 4,340/km^{2} (11,200/sq mi)
  - Metro: 6,800,000
  - City: 1,230,000

Literacy
  - Literates: 980,000
  - Literacy rate: 84.5%

Languages
  - Official: Telugu
- Time zone: UTC+05:30 (IST)
- PIN: 520001-22
- Area code: +91–866
- Vehicle registration: AP 39, AP 40
- Nominal GDP (2023–24): ₹48,000 crore (equivalent to ₹510 billion or US$5.3 billion in 2026)
- International Airport: Vijayawada Airport
- National Highways: NH 16, NH 65, NH 30

Vijayawada (/ˈvɪdʒəjəˈwɑːdə/ Vijay-uh-waw-duh), also called as Bezawada, is the second largest city and a major commercial hub in the Indian state of Andhra Pradesh. The city forms an integral part of the Andhra Pradesh Capital Region and is situated on the banks of the Krishna River, flanked by the Eastern Ghats and the Indrakeeladri Hills.

Vijayawada is an important agricultural trade hub in the state of Andhra Pradesh, particularly for mango commerce. The city's surrounding regions, including Nunna and Nuzvid, are well known for extensive mango cultivation and wholesale trading. The mango-growing belt around Vijayawada produces popular varieties such as Banganapalle, Totapuri, Cheruku Rasalu, and Suvarnarekha, which are distributed to several Indian states and export markets.Vijayawada is known for mango trade due to the Nunna mango market.

It is renowned for its iconic Kanaka Durga Temple, an important Hindu shrine that attracts millions of devotees each year. Geographically positioned near the centre of the state, Vijayawada is popularly described as the commercial, political, cultural, and educational capital of Andhra Pradesh. It also serves as the administrative headquarters of the newly formed NTR district. The Prakasam Barrage across the Krishna River is a pivotal infrastructure asset that connects NTR and Guntur districts.

Vijayawada is recognised as one of India's fastest growing urban areas. The 2023 Oxford Economics report ranked it among the top 10 fastest growing cities in the world.

Vijayawada is considered to be a sacred place due to it being home to one of the most visited and famous temples in Andhra Pradesh and India, the Kanaka Durga Temple of the Hindu Goddess Durga residing on the Indrakeeladri hill. It also serves as the ritual host of Pushkaram (a river worshipping ritual in India) of the River Krishna. There is a legend which says that Arjuna, one of the heroes of the Indian epic Mahabharata, prayed on top of the Indrakeeladri Hill in the city and won the blessings of the Lord Shiva to get the Pashupatastra to win the Kurukshetra War. It was called Vijayavatika (meaning Land of Victory in Telugu) when Goddess Durga killed the demon Mahishasura and rested on the Indrakeeladri Hill by the River Krishna establishing the victory over evil hence the place got its name Vijayavatika, "Vijaya" meaning victory, and "Vatika" meaning place or land in Telugu.

The city is the third most densely populated urban built-up area in the world. and is classified as a Y-grade city by the Sixth Central Pay Commission. The city is the second most populous in the state with a population of more than one million. It was recognised as a "Global City of the Future" by McKinsey Quarterly, which expected an increase to GDP of $17 billion by 2025. In October 2018, it was awarded with ISO 37120 platinum level certification and has been added to the "Global Cities Registry".

Due to the presence of several well-known educational institutions, the city has emerged as a major educational hub in recent times, with many of the nation's students studying in the city. It is predicted to be the world's, and India's, tenth fastest growing city economy through 2035 by an Oxford Economics report. Due to its high ratings in entertainment, construction, food, education, health care, and transport, it is ranked as India's ninth most liveable city as per Ease of Living Index 2018, and the Ministry of Housing and Urban Affairs and the second most liveable city in the state of Andhra Pradesh.

The Vijayawada Junction railway station is one of the busiest in the country. It is the tenth busiest railway junction in the country.

== Toponymy ==
There are many legends behind the origin of the name Vijayawada. It is said that Goddess Durga killed Mahishasura and relaxed at this place. As she was victorious, the place came to be known as Vijayawada (vijaya translates to victory and wada as place, literally meaning The Place of Victory). The hill was called as Indrekeeladri since it was frequently visited by Indra and his affiliates. The epic Mahabharata refers to the Indrakiladri hills as the place where Arjuna secured Pashupatastra from Lord Shiva. One of the names of Arjuna is "Vijaya" (invincible). Thus city thereafter came to be known as Vijayavatika ('Vatika' translates to place in Telugu) and later as Vijayawada.

A tale behind its acquiring the name Bezawada is that Goddess Krishnaveni (River Krishna) requested Arjuna to make a passage for her to merge into the Bay of Bengal. Hence, Arjuna made a bejjam (hole) through the mountains and the place came to be known as Bejjamwada which later changed to Bezawada. Other names of Vijayawada were being Vijayavata, Beejapuram, Kanakaprabha, Kanakapuram, Kanakawada, Jayapuri, Vijayapuri, Phalguna Kshetram and Jananathpura in the twelfth century CE.

== History ==
Bezawada (as Vijayawada was known then) was founded around 626 A.D. by Paricchedi Kings. Vijayawada history reveals that Bezawada (Vijayawada) was ruled by King Madhava Varma (one of the kings of Vishnukundina dynasty). Chinese Buddhist scholar Xuanzang stayed a few years in Bezawada (Vijayawada) in around 640 A.D. to copy and study the Abhidhamma Pitaka, the last of the three pitakas (Pali for baskets) constituting the Pali canon, the scriptures of Theravada Buddhism.

Mogalrajapuram hills have five rock-cut temples, built during the fourth–ninth centuries. Some of the caves can be attributed to Vishnukundina dynasty. Akkana Madanna Caves, at the foot of Indrakeeladri Hill, is a monument of national importance.

At the foot of Indrakeeladri hills is the temple of Malleswara. The temple has inscriptions dating back to ninth century AD to 16th century AD by various kings. There are ten pillars and a mutilated slab (recognised as monuments by Archaeological Survey of India) with inscriptions in the Telugu language. Of them, the inscriptions issued by Yudhamalla I and II of Eastern Chalukyas are important.

In the early 16th century, during the reign of Qutb Shahi dynasty (also known as Golconda Sultanate), diamond mines were found near Vijayawada on the banks of Krishna River.

== Geography ==
Vijayawada lies on the banks of Krishna river, covered by hills and canals. and at an altitude of 11 m (36 ft) above sea level. Three canals originating from the north side of the Prakasam Barrage reservoir — Eluru, Bandar, and Ryves — flow through the city.

=== Climate ===
Vijayawada has a tropical wet and dry climate (Köppen Aw). The annual mean temperatures range between 23.4–34 °C (74–93 °F); with maximum temperatures often crossing 40 °C (104 °F) in the month of May and the minimum in December and January. The highest maximum temperature ever recorded was 48.8 °C (119.8 °F) in May 2002. May is the hottest and January is the coldest month of the year. It receives rainfall from the South-west and North-east monsoons and the average annual rainfall recorded is 977.9 mm (38.50 in).

Climate data for Vijayawada (Vijayawada Airport, located in Gannavaram) 1991–2020, extremes 1950–present
Month	Jan	Feb	Mar	Apr	May	Jun	Jul	Aug	Sep	Oct	Nov	Dec	Year
Record high °C (°F)	35.9 (96.6)	38.2 (100.8)	43.3 (109.9)	44.5 (112.1)	48.8 (119.8)	47.6 (117.7)	41.0 (105.8)	41.1 (106.0)	39.4 (102.9)	38.2 (100.8)	35.8 (96.4)	36.7 (98.1)	48.8 (119.8)
Mean daily maximum °C (°F)	30.4 (86.7)	32.8 (91.0)	35.9 (96.6)	37.9 (100.2)	40.2 (104.4)	37.2 (99.0)	33.9 (93.0)	33.0 (91.4)	33.2 (91.8)	32.4 (90.3)	31.4 (88.5)	30.4 (86.7)	34.0 (93.2)
Mean daily minimum °C (°F)	18.5 (65.3)	20.0 (68.0)	22.7 (72.9)	25.3 (77.5)	27.3 (81.1)	26.7 (80.1)	25.4 (77.7)	25.1 (77.2)	24.9 (76.8)	23.8 (74.8)	21.4 (70.5)	18.9 (66.0)	23.3 (73.9)
Record low °C (°F)	11.1 (52.0)	14.4 (57.9)	17.0 (62.6)	19.4 (66.9)	19.4 (66.9)	20.2 (68.4)	20.2 (68.4)	20.2 (68.4)	18.2 (64.8)	17.6 (63.7)	14.0 (57.2)	13.0 (55.4)	11.1 (52.0)
Average rainfall mm (inches)	5.8 (0.23)	10.4 (0.41)	11.0 (0.43)	17.2 (0.68)	63.0 (2.48)	138.3 (5.44)	207.7 (8.18)	180.5 (7.11)	170.3 (6.70)	150.6 (5.93)	60.5 (2.38)	16.7 (0.66)	1,032 (40.63)
Average rainy days	0.5	0.6	0.5	0.9	2.5	7.4	12.1	10.4	8.7	7.6	2.6	0.6	54.3
Average relative humidity (%) (at 17:30 IST)	58	54	49	48	46	52	66	71	75	77	70	60	60
Source: India Meteorological Department

Vijayawada has been ranked the sixth best "National Clean Air City" (under Category 1 >10L Population cities) in India.

== Demographics ==
The city is the second most populous in the state and the third most densely populated urban built-up areas in the world, with approximately 31,200 people per square km. As of 2011 Census of India, it had a population of 1,021,806, of which males are 524,918 and females are 523,322—for a sex ratio of 997 females per 1000 males—higher than the national average of 940 per 1000. 92,848 children were in the age group of 0–6 years, of which 47,582 were boys and 45,266 were girls: a ratio of 951 per 1000. The average literacy rate stood at 82.59% (male 86.25%; female 78.94%) with 789,038 literates, significantly higher than the national average of 73.00%.

=== Language and religion ===
Religion in Vijayawada City (2011)
Hinduism	85.16%
Islam	9.12%
Christianity	3.64%
Jainism	0.50%
Other or not stated	1.58%

Languages of Vijayawada (2011)
1. Telugu (89.4%)
2. Urdu (7.95%)
3. Others (2.63%)

The predominant language spoken by the city residents is Telugu. In the 2011 census, the total number of language speakers in the city (including the outgrowths) were 1,143,232. Telugu is spoken by 1,022,376 speakers, followed by 90,876 Urdu. A small minority speak Hindi, Tamil, Odia, Gujarati, Marathi and Malayalam. In the same census, the total religious population in the city (including the outgrowths) was 1,143,232. It constituted 973,612 Hindus (85.16%), 104,206 Muslims (9.12%), 41,557 Christians (3.64%), 5,722 Jains (0.50%) and 18,135 (1.59%) did not state any religion.

== Governance ==
Vijayawada Municipal Corporation

=== Civic administration ===
Vijayawada Municipal Corporation is the civic governing body of the city and was the first ISO 9001 certified urban local body in the country.

It was constituted on 1 April 1888 and was upgraded to selection grade municipality in 1960, and, to the corporation in 1981. The jurisdictional area of the corporation is spread over an area of 230 km^{2} (89 sq mi) with 64 wards. The present Municipal Commissioner of the city is Sri Dhyanachandra H M, IAS and the present Mayor is Rayana Bhagya Lakshmi. Vijayawada is the headquarters of Andhra Pradesh Capital Region Development Authority.

As per the G.O. 104 (dated:23-03-2017), the state government had declared Vijayawada Municipal Corporation and its contiguous areas as a metropolitan area of Vijayawada. Its jurisdiction is spread over an area of 230 km^{2} (89 sq mi) and has an estimated population of 18 lakhs. The metropolitan area covers Vijayawada municipal corporation and merged villages of Ambapuram, Buddavaram, Done Atkuru, Enikepadu, Ganguru, Gannavaram, Gollapudi, Gudavalli, Jakkampudi, Kanuru, Kesarapalle, Nidamanuru, Nunna, Pathapadu, Penamaluru, Phiryadi Nainavaram, Poranki, Prasadampadu, Ramavarappadu, Tadigadapa, Kankipadu, Vuyyuru, Katuru, Bollapadu, Mudunuru and Yanamalakuduru. The urban agglomeration spread in Guntur district covers Tadepalle Municipality and its outgrowth of Undavalli; Mangalagiri Municipality and its outgrowths of Navuluru and Atmakur.

=== Municipal finance ===
According to financial data published on the CityFinance Portal of the Ministry of Housing and Urban Affairs, the Vijayawada Municipal Corporation reported total revenue receipts of ₹389 crore (US$47 million) and total expenditure of ₹197 crore (US$24 million) in 2022–23. Tax revenue accounted for about 45.5% of the total revenue, while the corporation received ₹0.001 crore in grants during the financial year.

=== Utility services ===
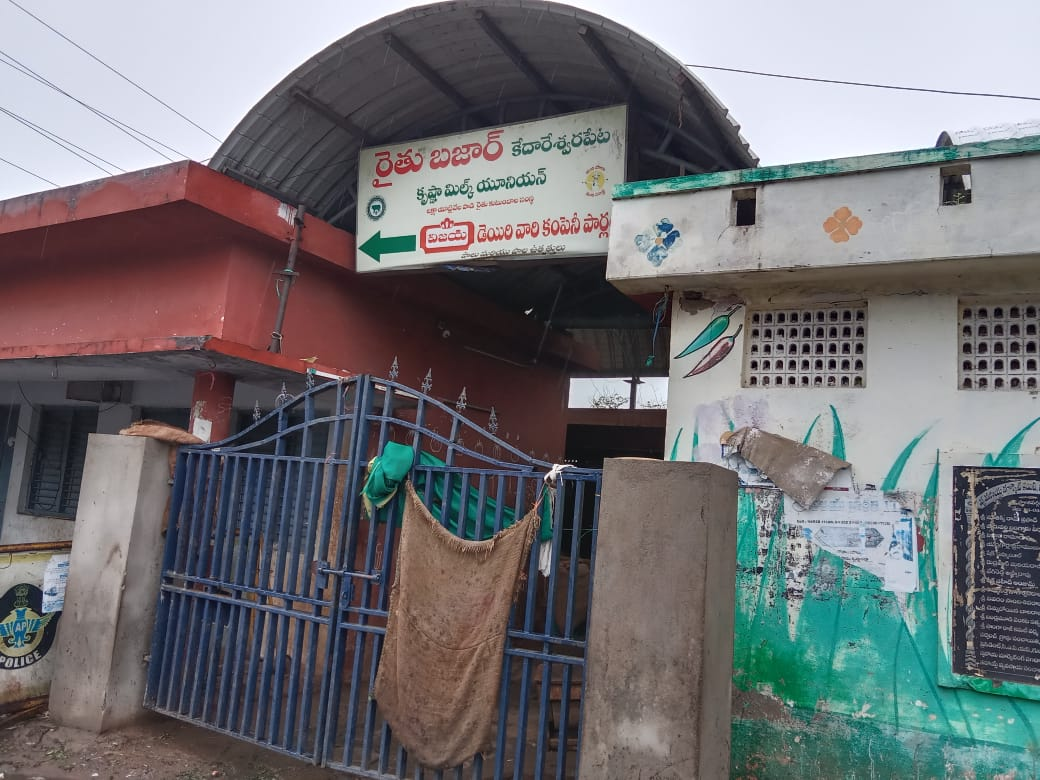
Rythubazar, Kedareshwarpeta

Water supply from the 59 water reservoirs, maintenance of roads, sewerage, underground drainage, environment protection programs, recycling of solid waste and producing power are the services provided by the Vijayawada Municipal Corporation. There has been an underground drainage system in the city since 1967–68. Many green parks are maintained by the corporation to protect the environment such as Raghavaiah park, Rajiv Gandhi Park, Dr. B.R Ambedkar Park, Mahatma Gandhi Park etc. The corporation won many awards and achievements such as National Urban Water Award (2009), Siti e-Governance Project, ISO 9001 certification for Quality Management System.

The Andhra Pradesh State Disaster Response and Fire Services Department with its headquarters in the city is responsible for protecting from fire accidents that occur during summers on the hill slope areas of the city.

=== Pollution control ===
The report on solid waste generation in 46 metro cities for the year 2015–16 shows Vijayawada produces 550 tonnes of solid waste per day. Vijayawada is one of the cities to be covered under the Solar/Green Cities scheme launched by the Ministry of New and Renewable Energy and is one of the 15 cities in the country listed in Pilot Solar Cities.

In 2007, the Andhra Pradesh State Road Transport Corporation (APSRTC) that operates the city's public transport system introduced less-polluting CNG fuelled public transport busses in a drive to reduce the operational cost and protect the environment. In 2019, with the cost of CNG and fleet maintenance on the rise, the APSRTC had begun replacing the CNG run busses with BS4 and BS6 standard diesel-fuelled buses. However, APSRTC continues to be committed to alternative fuels for its fleet. It has since added more electric, and biodiesel fuelled busses.

Likewise, the city has a large number of CNG fuelled auto-rickshaws that support public transportation needs. However, auto-rickshaw operators have frequently suffered disruption in CNG supply and usually endure long queues to refuel. In February 2020, Piaggio Vehicles Private Limited launched the sale of electric auto-rickshaws in the city.

=== Law and order ===
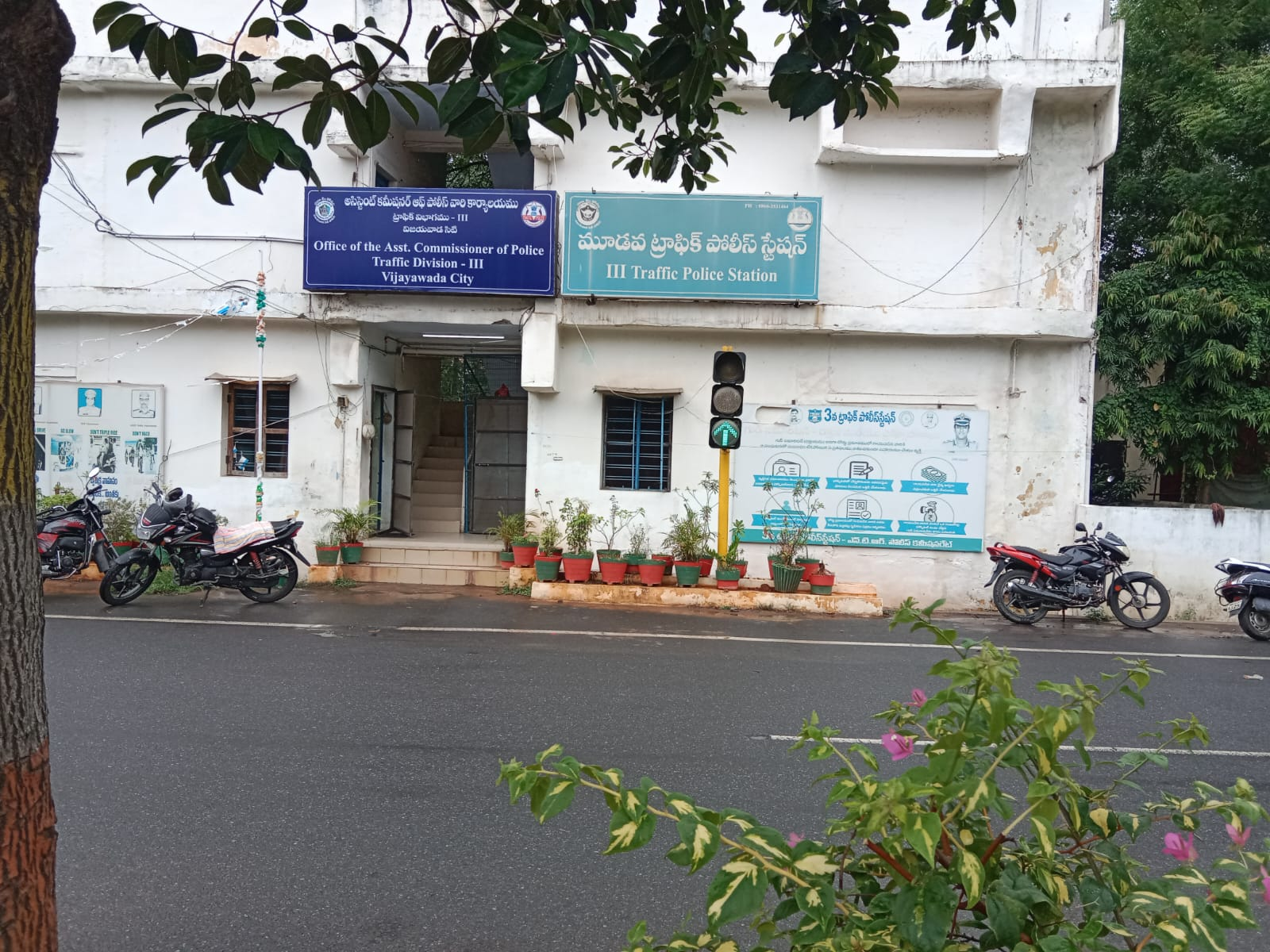
Office of assistant commissioner of police, traffic division - III, Vijayawada city

The Vijayawada City Police has its own Police Commissionerate, which is responsible for an area of 1,211.16 km^{2} (467.63 sq mi), is headed by a Police Commissioner, who is an IPS officer of Additional Director General of Police rank along with one joint commissioner of police and four Deputy Commissioners of Police who are also IPS officers. The present Police commissioner is Bathini Sreenivasulu.

== Economy ==
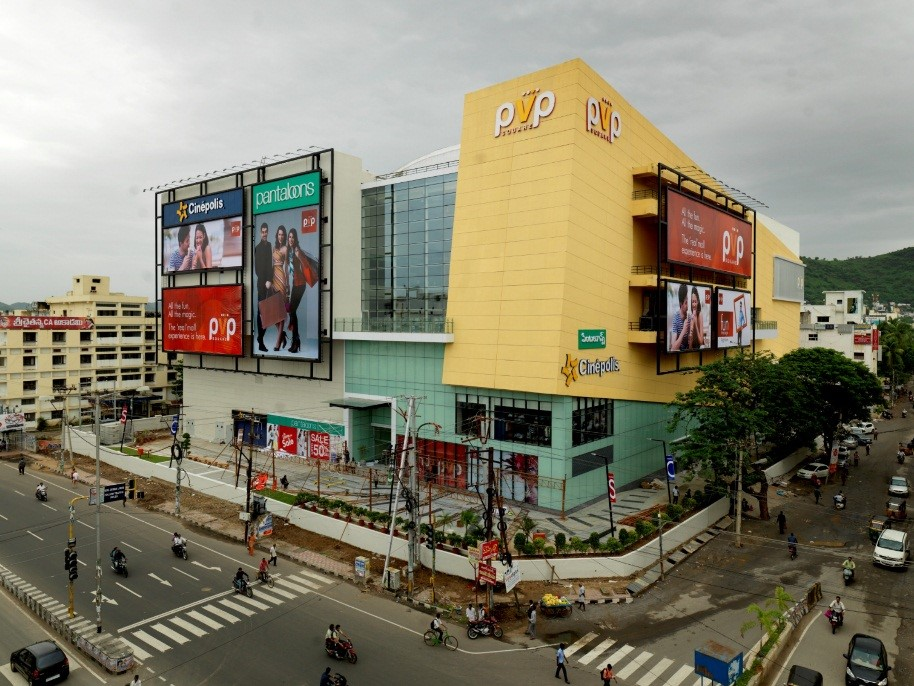
A view of PVP Mall on M.G. Road

Fishing boats near Prakasam Barrage

As of 2020 GDP of Vijayawada city is $11.292 Billion. Vijayawada is one of the rapidly growing urban markets of the country. The sectors that contribute to the city economy are construction, education, entertainment, food processing, hospitality, registrations, transport, etc. Based on the recommendations of the Sixth Central Pay Commission, it is classified as one of the Y-grade cities of India. According to one study, the GDP of the city in 2010 was $3 billion (Rs. 18,000 crore) and is expected to grow up to $17 billion (Rs. 1,02,000 crore) by 2025. According to another by Oxford the GDP of the city in 2018 was $5.8 billion and is expected to grow up to $21 billion by 2035.

Andhra Cements (1937) was the first cement factory in Andhra Pradesh. Siris Pharmaceuticals was the first pharma company in Andhra Pradesh and was established in 1950.

The city has trading and exporting markets for agriculture and industrial goods. The Nunna Mango Market is one of the largest mango markets in Asia, exporting to major cities in the country. It is also a hub for storage, bottling, and transportation of petroleum products of all major companies like BPCL, HPCL, and IOCL.

The city is also attracting many international IT companies. HCL Technologies, Wipro, the Noida-based Indian multinational is constructing its Vijayawada campus in Kesarapalli village, near to Gannavaram. In the first phase, HCL will provide employment to 5,000 students.

There are two major IT parks one at Gannavaram and other in Mangalagiri there are big companies like TechMahindra, HCL, PI Data Center, VSoft, Efftronics, KJ Systems, and EPSoft. The city is also most preferred tier-two city destination for IT/ITES services. There is an APIIC Mega Food Park in Mallavalli near Gannavaram.

The growing population and economy have resulted in rising real estate prices. There is also a cyber security office that is operating by Tech mahindra.And the Wonderla an amusement park is trying to invest around 250 crores rupees to expand its branch in between guntur and vijayawada in 50 acres.

=== Mango trade and horticulture ===
The mango market located at Nunna, part of the Vijayawada metropolitan area, is widely recognized as one of the largest mango markets in Asia. During the peak summer season, thousands of tonnes of mangoes are traded through this market, supporting farmers, traders, transporters, and processing industries. Mango cultivation and trade contribute significantly to the regional economy and reinforce Vijayawada’s role as a major horticultural distribution center in Andhra Pradesh.

Mangoes also hold cultural importance in the Vijayawada region, being extensively used in traditional Telugu cuisine, especially in seasonal preparations such as mango pickle (Avakaya) and raw mango dishes during summer. This agricultural and cultural significance has led to Vijayawada being popularly associated with mango trade in Andhra Pradesh

== Culture ==
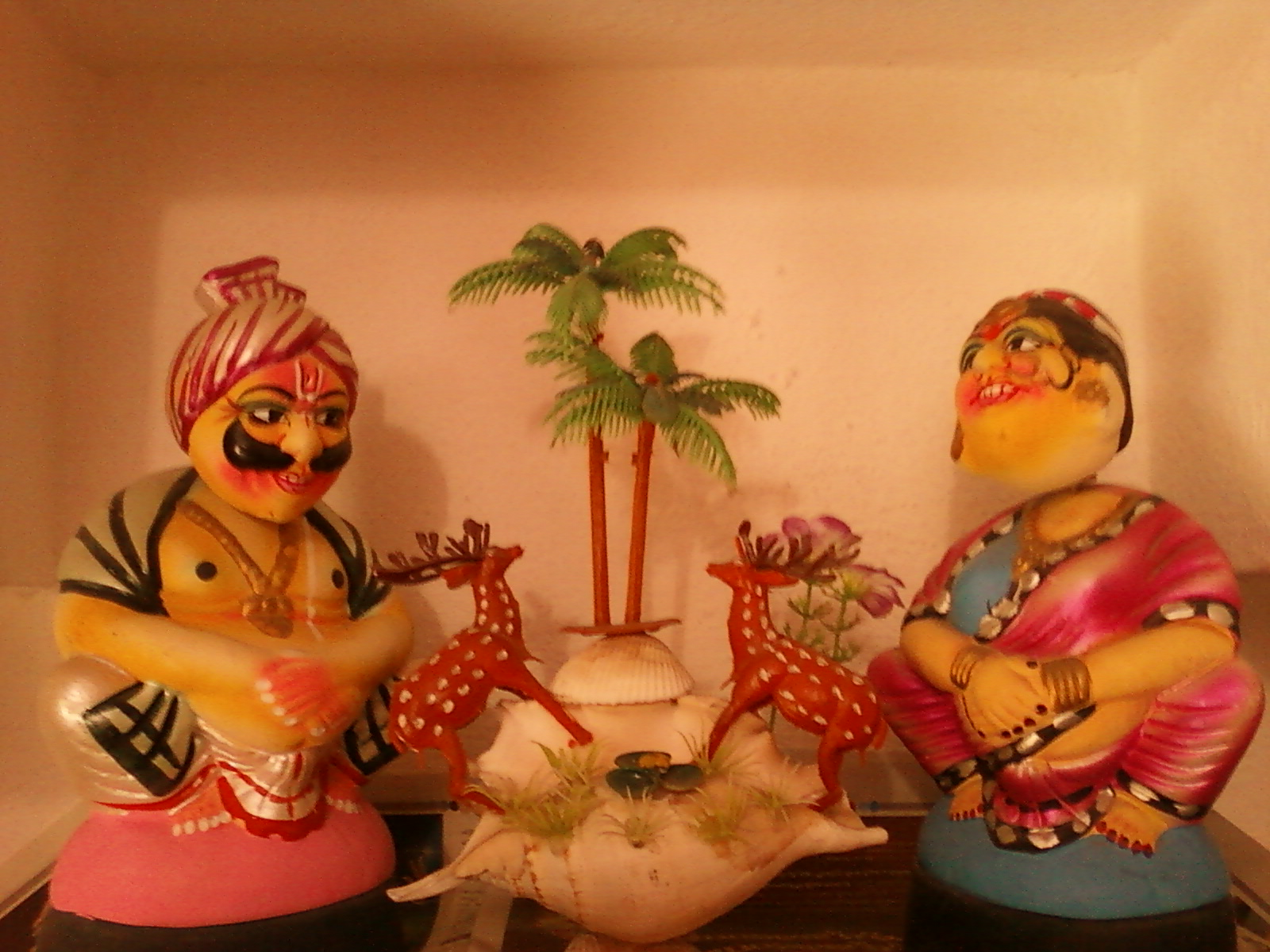
Kondapalli toys, craftwork from a suburb of Vijayawada

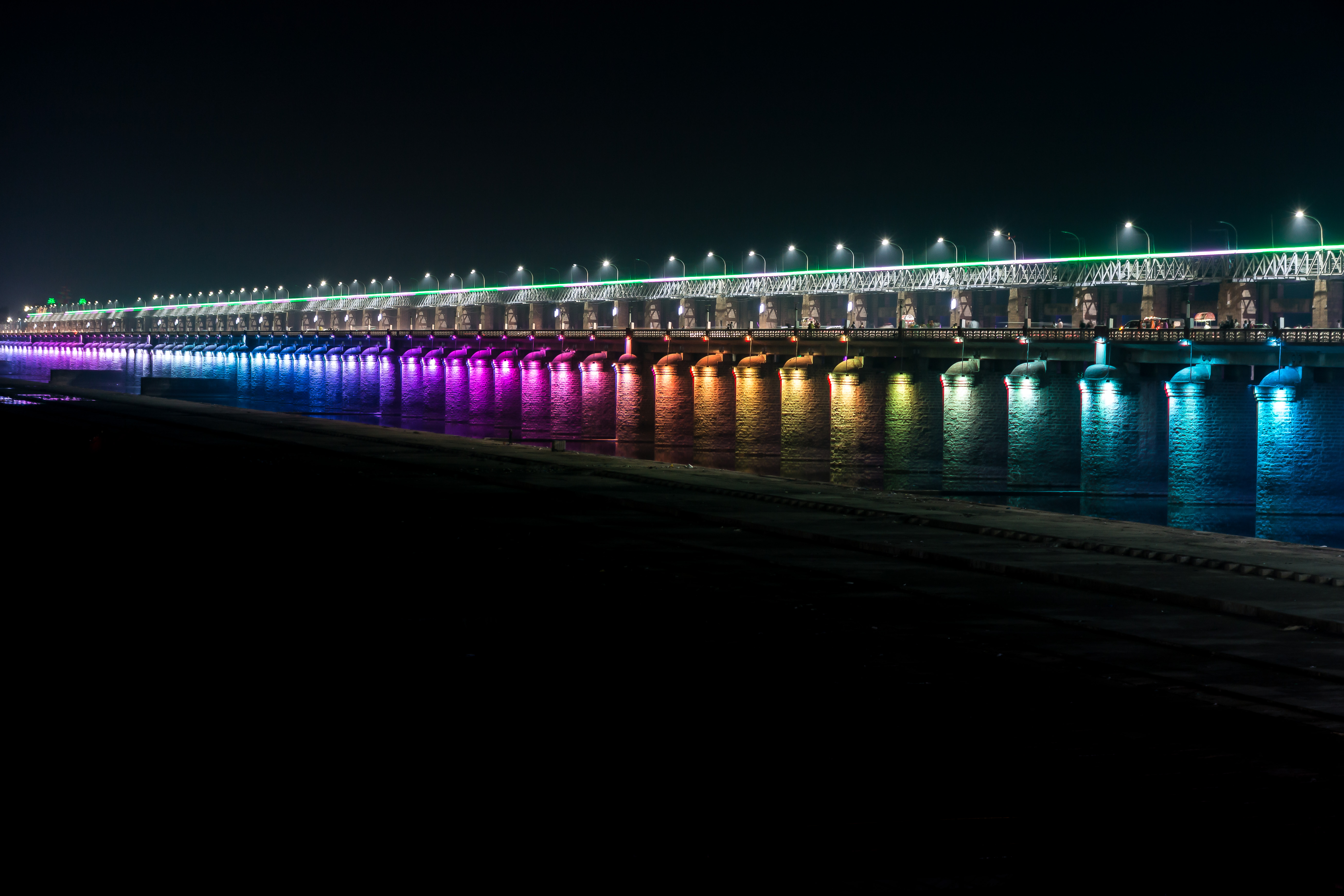
Night view of Prakasam Barrage

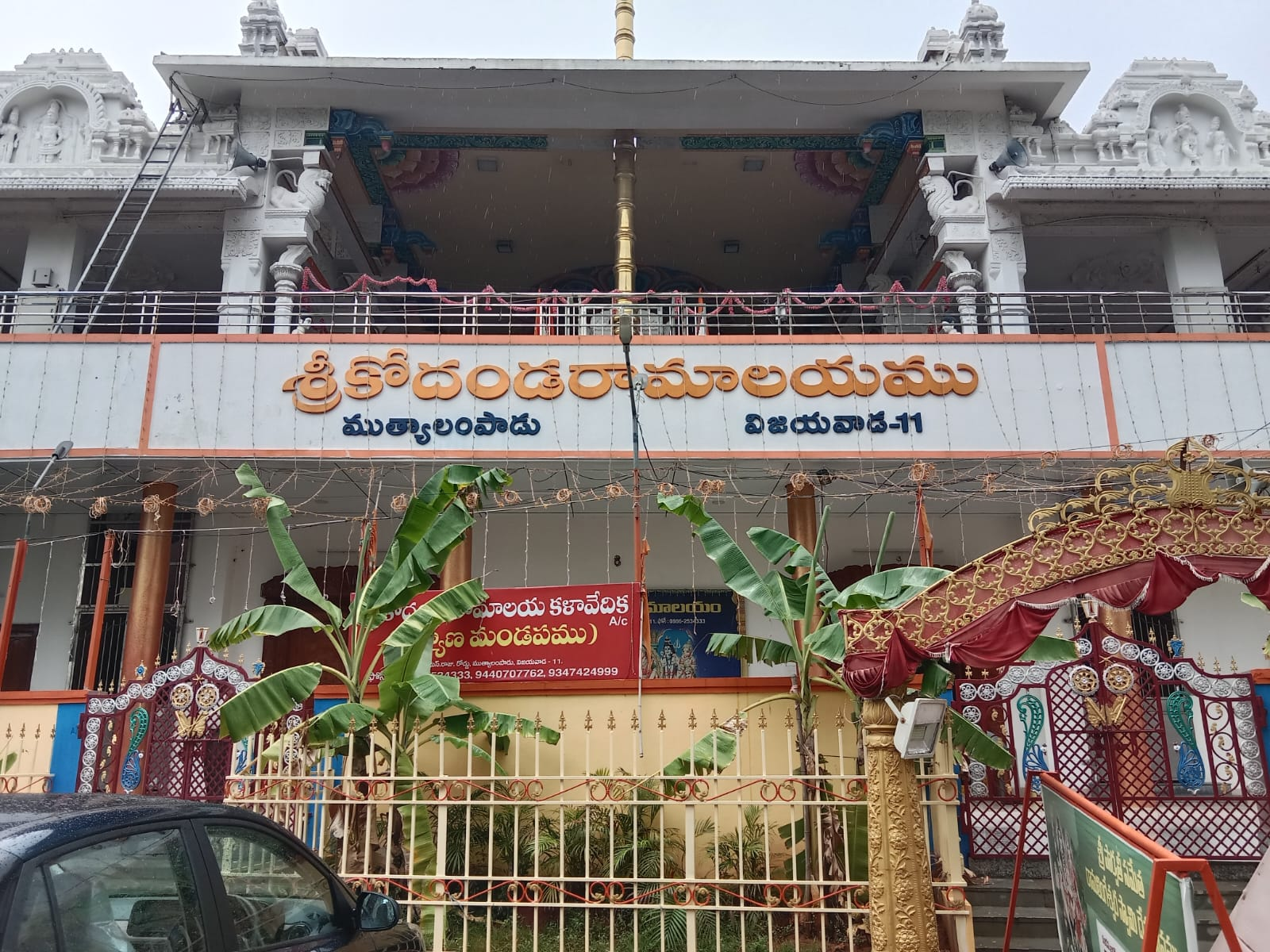
Sri KodandaRamalayam, Near Upendra Chowk, Muthyalampadu

The city is known in the state for its cultural history, whose residents are more often referred to as Vijayawadians. There are many religions, languages, traditions, and festivals. Durga Pooja and a special Theppotsavam in Krishna river are important events of the Hindu festival of Dussera in the city, mainly due to the existence of self-manifested Kanaka Durga Temple. Hazarat Bal Mosque is a Muslim shrine housing the holy relic of the Prophet Mohammed. Gunadala Matha Shrine is an important shrine for Christians and illuminates during Christmas Eve and Gunadala Matha annual festival which takes place on 9, 10 and 11 February each year.

The city corporation organises "Happy Sunday," an event organised on the first Sunday of every month at M.G. Road for promoting activities such as sports, games, cultural events, and yoga. The clothing of the locals includes traditional men wearing dhoti and women wearing saree and salwar kameez. Western clothing is also predominant.

=== Arts, crafts and artefacts ===
The Vijayawada Art Society promotes Telugu arts. The city hosted Poetic Prism 2015, a multilingual poet's meet on 19 September 2015. All these activities are organised in collaboration with the Cultural Centre of Vijayawada.

Kondapalli Toys — which were granted geographical indication in 2007 — are handmade by the artisans of Kondapalli, a suburb of Vijayawada. Kondapalli toys, also known as Kondapalli Bommalu, are traditional wooden toys crafted by skilled artisans in Kondapalli, Andhra Pradesh, India. These toys are known for their intricate designs and vibrant colours, made from soft Tella Poniki wood and painted with natural dyes. They are safe for children to play with due to their non-toxic materials and lack of harmful chemicals. Originating from Rajasthan in the 16th century, Kondapalli artisans are considered 'Aryakhastriyas'.

Victoria Jubilee Museum is an archaeological museum in the city, which houses sculptures, paintings, and artefacts of Buddhist and Hindu relics, dating back to the second and third centuries.

=== Cityscape ===
Vijayawada was paired as a sister city of Modesto, California, in 1993. The city has old and new town areas. The One Town area of the city is known as old city area, comprising areas such as Islampet, Jendachettu Centre, Kamsalipet, Rajarajeswaripet, Kothapet, Ajith Singh Nagar, and Winchipet. The new city areas include areas such as Autonagar, Benz circle, Chuttugunta, Labbipet, Machavaram Down, Mogalrajapuram, NTR circle, Tikkle Road, Governorpeta, Pinnamaneni Polyclinic Road and Suryaraopet.

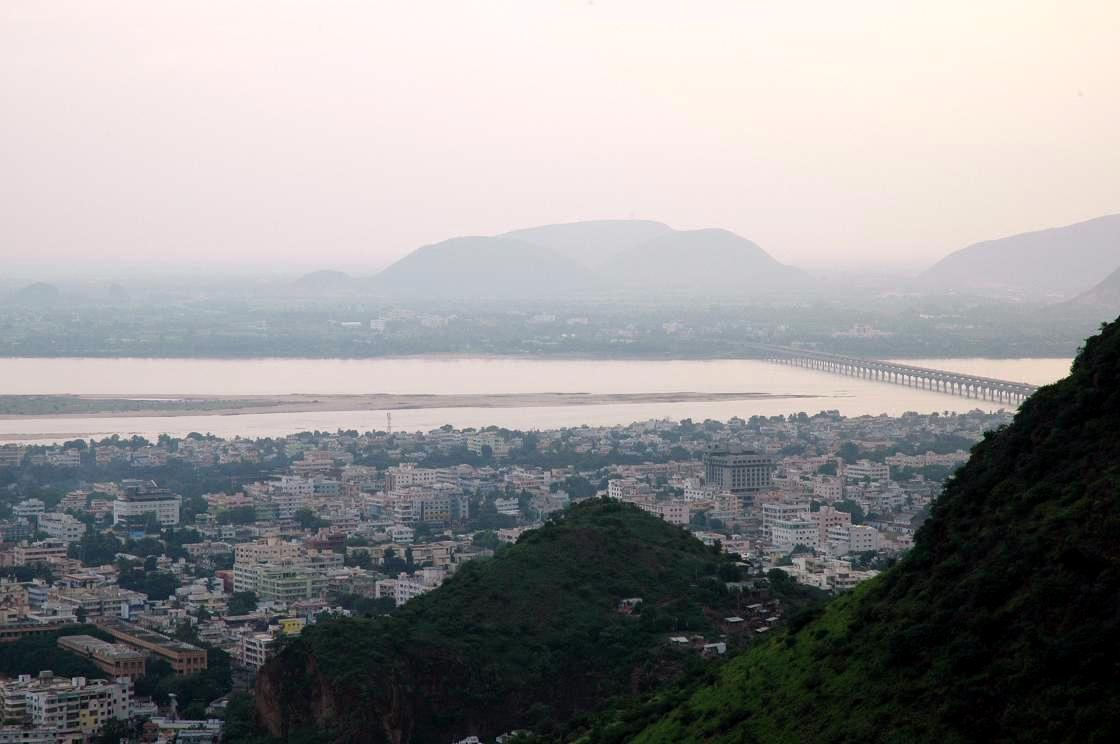
Vijayawada city from Gandhi hill

Brindavan Colony, Commercial Taxes Colony, Gunadala, Veterinary Colony are some of the residential areas. Bank Colony, Bharati Nagar, Gayatri Nagar, Currency Nagar, Satyanarayana Puram, Gurunanak Colony, APIIC Colony, LIC Colony, Patamata and MG Road are the upscale residential areas. The major commercial areas include the stretch of MG Road and from Benz Circle to Ramavarappadu Ring. Other commercial centers are Besant Road, Rajagopalachari street, One Town market area covering Kaleswara Rao Market (KR Market), and Vastralatha.

The city has many landmarks which include, Prakasam Barrage across the Krishna river; Krishnaveni Mandapam (River Museum) depicting the history of Krishna river and a nearby idol of the river known as, Krishnaveni statue; Gandhi Hill, the first Gandhi Memorial in the country, located at an elevation of 500 feet (150 m) on a hill; Bhavani Island, one of the largest river island amidst Krishna river.

== Transport ==
=== Public transport ===
The primary modes of intra-city public transport are city buses and auto rickshaws. Apart from these, other means of transport are motorcycles, cycle rickshaws, and bicycles. The Pandit Nehru Bus Station and the Vijayawada Junction railway station are the major transport infrastructure for road and rail transport. The Pandit Nehru bus station is the administrative headquarters of APSRTC, which is ranked as the fourth largest and busiest bus terminals in the country. The City Division of APSRTC operates close to 450 buses for an average of 300,000 daily commuting passengers. Autonagar bus terminus and city bus port is used for city bus services. The city buses ply in major routes of Besant Road, Eluru Road, MG Road and to the city outskirts of Ibrahimpatnam, Kondapalli, Mangalagiri, Kankipadu, Uyyuru, Gannavaram, Nidamanuru and Nunna. In 2016, APSRTC has discontinued city services on the BRTS corridor due to poor response from the commuters. It was built at a reported cost of ₹150 crore (US$16 million), exclusively to be used by city buses has been.

=== Road ===
The two major National Highways, NH-16 (Kolkata–Bhubaneshwar-Visakhapatnam-Vijayawada-Guntur-Nellore-Chennai) and NH-65 (Pune-Hyderabad-Suryapet-Vijayawada-Machilipatnam), provides road connectivity with other states and major cities. National Highway 30 from Jagdalpur of Chhattisgarh terminates near the city suburb of Ibrahimpatnam. The Inner Ring Road connects NH-16 and NH-65 to serve the main purpose of easing traffic congestion.

The seamless commuting in the city is supported by the presence of 16 bridges across the three canals of Bandar, Eluru, and Ryves. M. G. Road (Bandar Road) and Eluru Road are the major arterial roads of the city, with as many as 90,000 vehicles plying M. G. Road itself. The city has a total road length of 1,264.24 km (785.56 mi), used by 678,004 non-transport and 94,937 transport vehicles. The heavy vehicles like lorries are used for freight transport and hold a share of 18% in the country. Short distance commuting is served by 27,296 auto rickshaws plying the city roads every day, which include the women-driven 'She Autos' as well. The city has a total road length of 1,264.24 km (785.56 mi), covering 1,230.00 km (764.29 mi) of municipal roads, 22.74 km (14.13 mi) of R&B (Roads & Buildings) department roads, 11.50 km (7.15 mi) of National Highways. Benz Circle is one of the busiest road junctions in the city with an average of 57,000 vehicles crossing daily, The junction has the intersection of two national highways of NH 16 and NH 65.

Golden Mile Project

MG Road in Vijayawada is home to the Golden Mile Project, India’s first smart street initiative. Covering a 2.9 km stretch from the Police Control Room to Benz Circle, it was launched as a Proof of Concept for the Smart City initiative by the Government of Andhra Pradesh. Supported by Cisco Systems, the project provides facilities such as free Wi-Fi, intelligent street lighting, smart parking, and digital kiosks. The total cost of ₹7.83 crore was shared between Cisco, the Andhra Pradesh Urban Finance & Infrastructure Development Corporation, and the Vijayawada Municipal Corporation. The project enables real-time monitoring through the City Digital Platform at the municipal office. It includes 101 surveillance cameras, with some capable of calculating traffic density and providing live reports. Additionally, 35 Wi-Fi access points and 240 smart solar-powered lights were installed for public use. Parking sensors help reduce congestion, and motion sensors manage traffic and detect violations. The project also introduced Remote Expert Government Services, allowing citizens to communicate with officials via video calls.

=== Rail ===
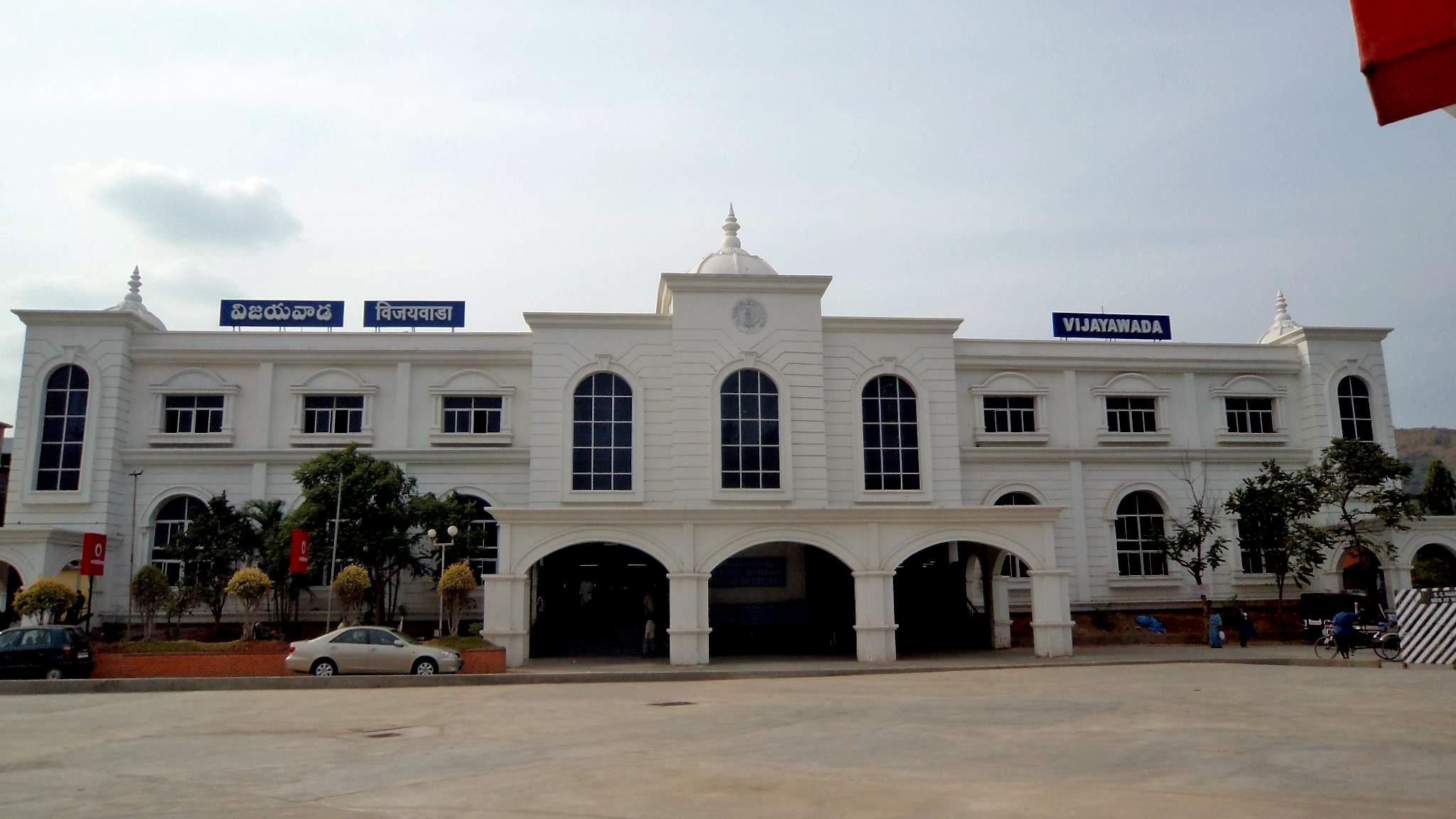
Vijayawada railway station

Vijayawada Junction railway station was established in the year 1888. It is one of the busiest stations of Indian Railways, the busiest railway station in South India, and is classified as a Non-Suburban Grade-2 (NSG-2) station in Vijayawada railway division. The station is a junction station for the trains from Hyderabad, Chennai Central, Machilipatnam and Visakhapatnam Junction. A train route connecting Vijayawada and Hyderabad was laid in 1889. Suburban rail services are operated from the railway station to the nearby cities of Guntur and Tenali. The city houses the headquarters of Vijayawada railway division, one of the three railway divisions of South Coast Railway zone. The station has also a diesel and electric loco sheds which have a capacity of holding 220 locos by both the sheds. The city of Vijayawada has several satellite stations such as Gannavaram, Gunadala, Krishna Canal, Ramavarappadu, Kondapalli, Rayanapadu, Madhura Nagar, and Nidamanuru.

==== Suburban and high speed rail ====
A proposed circular train connectivity would connect Vijayawada with neighbouring cities of Eluru, Guntur, Tenali, Mangalagiri and the state capital, Amaravati.

==== Metro rail System ====
A 66 km light transit system is proposed to connect the city with Amaravati and its surrounding suburbs.The metro project is implemented by a special purpose vehicle named as, Amaravati Metro Rail Corporation. Amaravati Metro Rail Corporation has been renamed as Andhra Pradesh Metro Rail Corporation Ltd after the Managing Director of AMRC suggested that it might be appropriate to change the name AMRC as APMRC so as to implement the Metro Projects in other parts of the State and the ruling government obliged.

=== Air ===
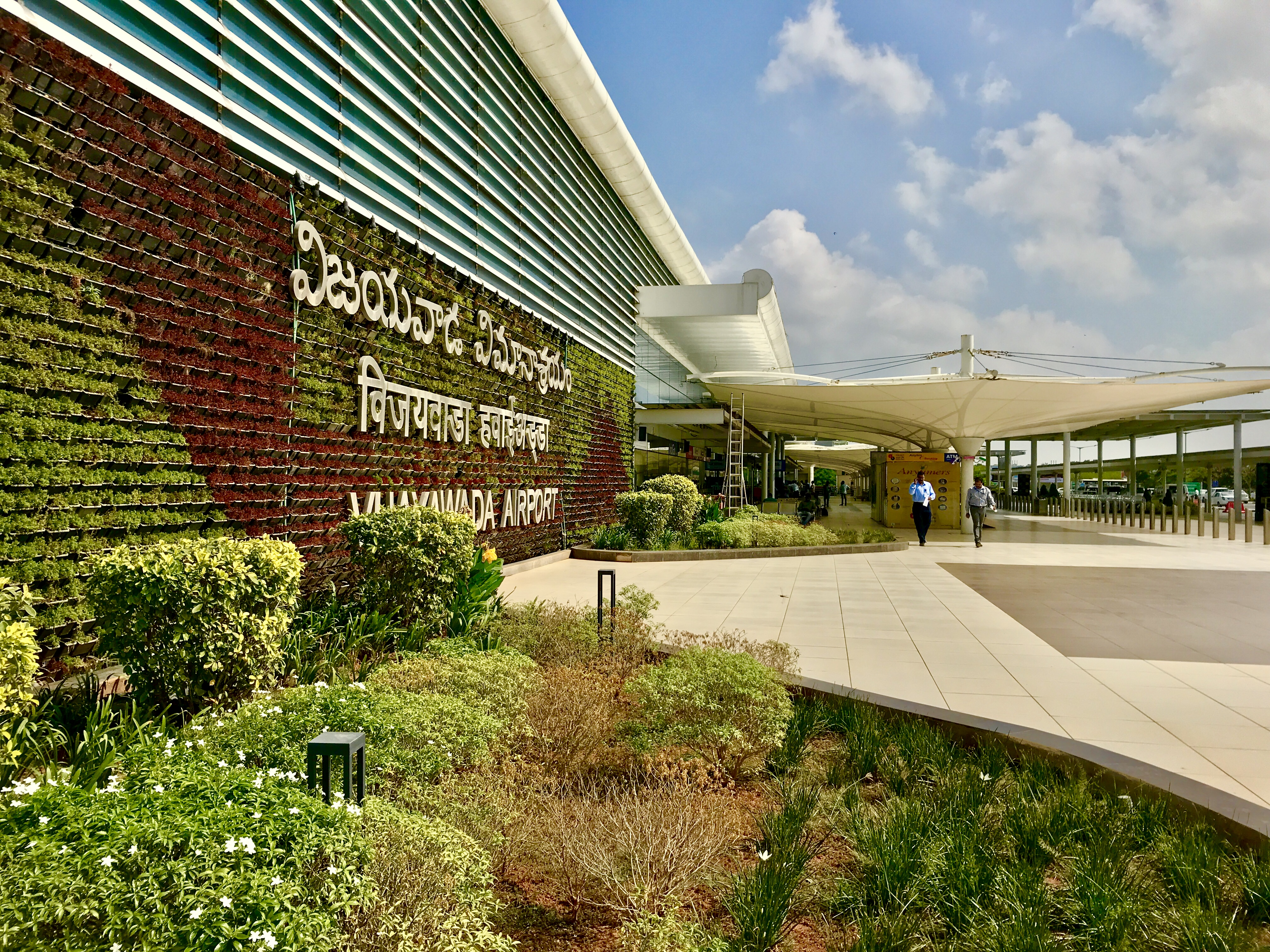
Vijayawada Airport

The Vijayawada Airport at Gannavaram provides air connectivity to major metropolitan cities of the country. On 3 May 2017, the airport was upgraded from domestic to international. Currently, Air India, Jet Airways and SpiceJet are operating in the Vijayawada Airport. International flights started from 4 December 2018 by Indigo Airlines to Singapore. The international flights to Singapore stopped after 27 June 2019 because the State Government stopped viability gap funding in June 2019. As of June 2019, it registered a domestic passenger movement growth rate of 70.0% with a total of 1,192,000 passengers in 2019. Aircraft movement recorded a growth of 65.0%.

== Education ==
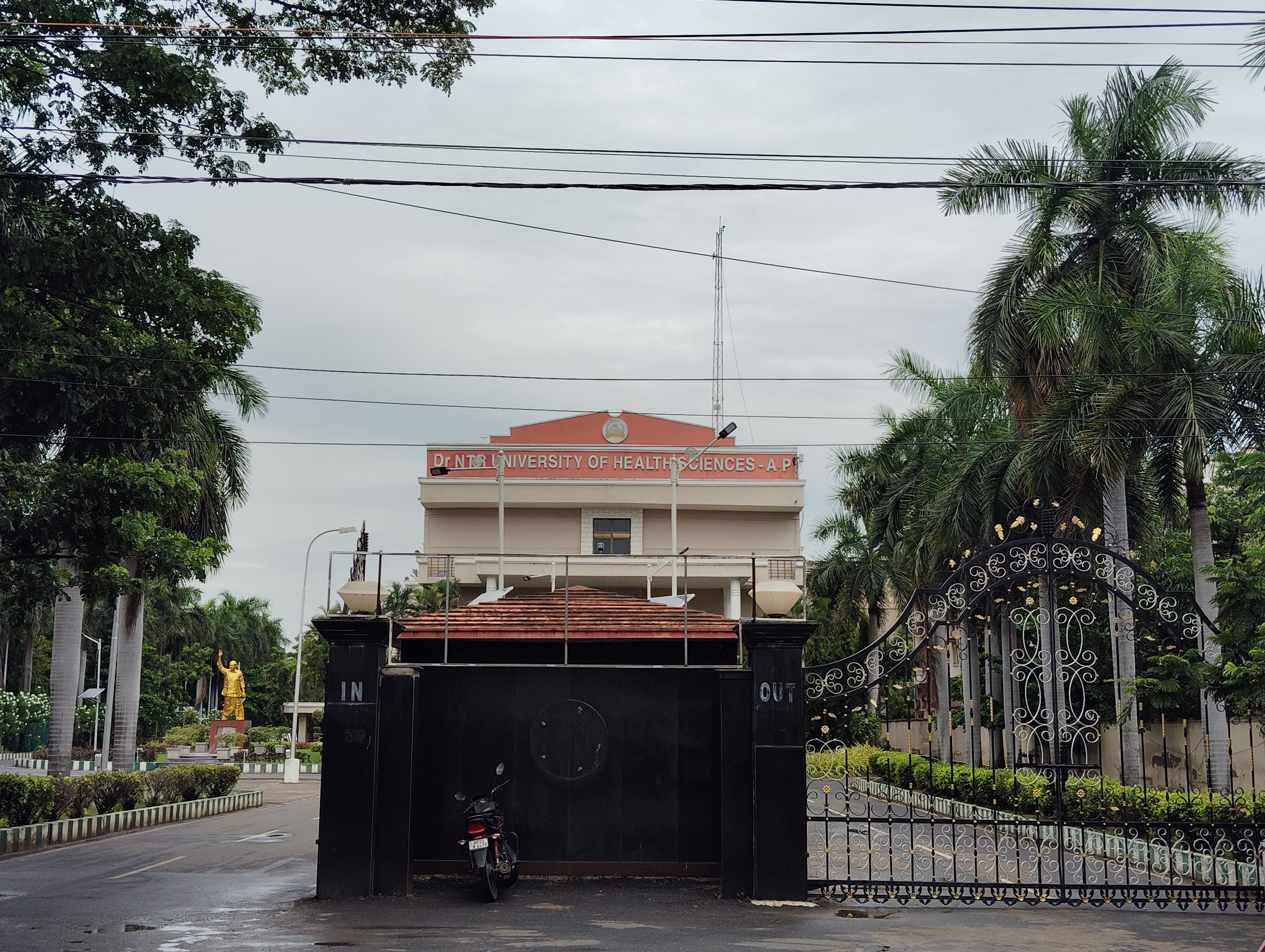
NTR University of Health Sciences

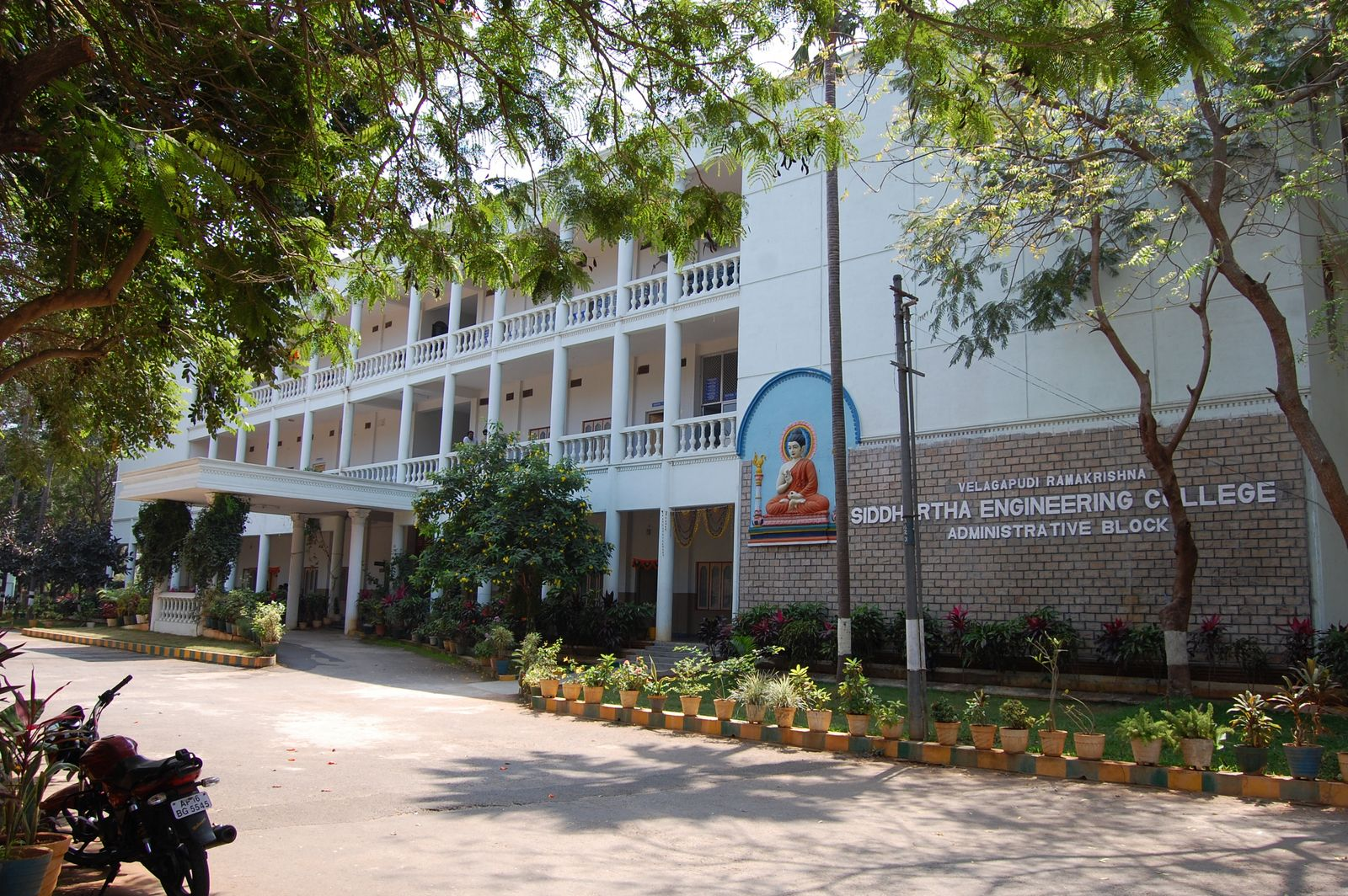
Administrative office of V.R. Siddhartha Engineering College

The Primary and Secondary School Education is imparted by the Government, Aided and Private Schools, under the State School Education Department. As per the school information report for the academic year 2015–16, the city has 133,837 students enrolled in 529 Schools. The state and CBSE syllabus are followed by schools for the Secondary School Certificate. The languages of instruction are English, Urdu and Telugu.

For 10+2 education, there are two government junior colleges, namely S.R.R. & C.V.R. Government College and Government Junior College (at Vinchipeta); a railway junior college; three co-operative, 12 private aided, including the oldest, S.R.R & C.V.R College (established in 1937), Andhra Loyola College (established in December 1953), Maria Stella College for Girls (established in 1962), KBN College (established in 1965), Velagapudi Ramakrishna Siddhartha Engineering College (established in 1977), the oldest engineering college in Andhra Pradesh, and many private unaided colleges. School of Planning and Architecture, Vijayawada (SPAV) was established in 2008, a higher education institute in Vijayawada. It is one of the three Schools of Planning and Architecture (SPAs) established by the Ministry of Human Resource Development in 2008 as an autonomous institute and a fully central funded institution.

The Sarvotthama Grandhalaya is a city library established on 30 March 1987. It serves an average daily readership of 200, equipped with 22,000 books related to many fields. VMC & VBFS Research and Reference Library is a reader's room/library maintained by Vijayawada Book Festival Society.

== Media ==
Visalaandhra was the first newspaper in the state, started from Vijayawada. As per the 58th annual report of Press India 2013–14, the large and medium Telugu daily publications from Vijayawada include Andhra Jyothy, Eenadu, Sakshi, Suryaa, Andhra Prabha, Vaartha, Prajasakti, and Udaya Bharatam. The English publications are Deccan Chronicle, The Hindu, The Times of India, The Hans India, News Boom, The Fourth Voice, and Views Observer.

The All India Radio Vijayawada was commissioned on 1 December 1948. Its building was named after Pingali Venkayya, the designer of the Indian flag. The channels broadcast by All India Radio are Rainbow Krishnaveni FM, Vividh Bharati. Telugu Doordarshan Saptagiri is located here.

== Sports ==
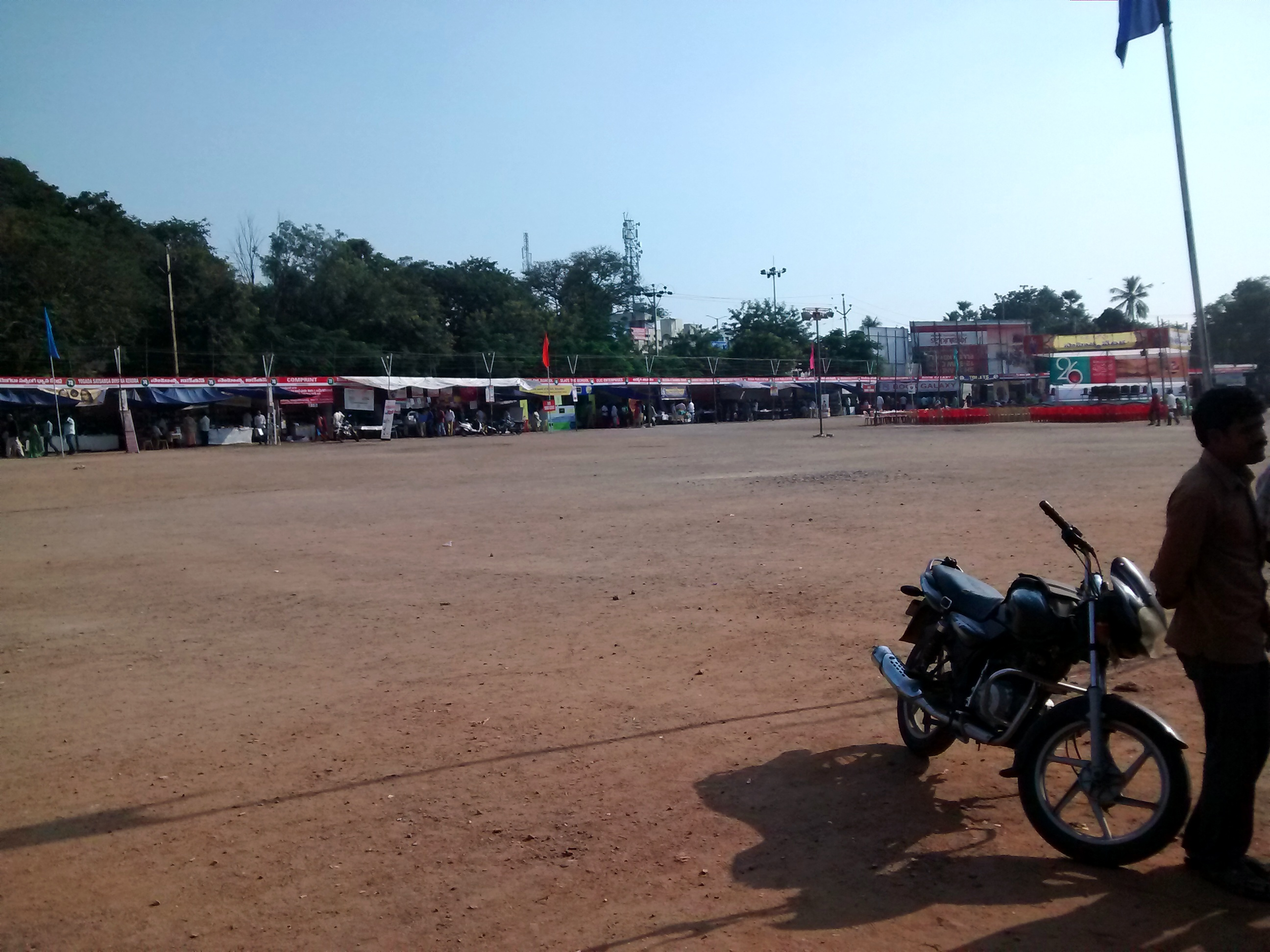
Vijayawada PWD ground

Indira Gandhi Stadium in the city is the headquarters of the Sports Authority of Andhra Pradesh. It hosted its only men's One Day International (ODI) on 24 November 2002, played between India and West Indies.

The only women's ODI was hosted on 12 December 1997, played as a group match of 1997 Women's Cricket World Cup between England women's and Pakistan women's teams. Makineni Basavapunnaiah Stadium at Ajit Singh Nagar is another stadium that caters the sporting needs of the northern part of the city. Indoor stadiums include Dandamudi Rajagopala Rao Indoor Stadium (DRRIS) at M. G.Road and Chennupati Ramakotaiah Indoor Stadium (CRIS) at Patamatalanka. The DRRIS was named after the former weightlifter, Dandamudi Rajagopal Rao, who participated in the 1951 Asian Games and the 1956 Olympics. The DRRIS hosted several national and international sporting events, such as the 79th Senior Badminton Champions.

Andhra Cricket Association (ACA) International Cricket Stadium is being built on a 30-acre (12 ha) site at Navuluru village, Mangalagiri Mandal of Guntur district, 15 km (9.3 mi) from the city. It serves as the Andhra Cricket Association stadium. Vijaya Madhavi Tennis Academy is in Loyola College. Loyola College Grounds hosted many national-level events which includes a Ranji match.

The Railway Sports Stadium, near the railway station, hosted several national level railway competitions such as bodybuilding competitions, Under-19 Cricket championships and a few non-railway events. This stadium has a gallery facility of over 10,000 people. Makineni Basava Punnaiah stadium is another open stadium in the city. Dandamudi Rajagopal Rao Indoor Stadium is one of the noted Badminton stadiums in Andhra Pradesh. It has hosted several national level Badminton and Table Tennis championships.

== Awards ==
The Swachh Survekshan 2021 has identified Vijayawada as the third cleanest city in the nation. In the category of cities with more than 10 lakh inhabitants, the city rose from sixth place in 2020 to third place this year. A five-star designation for "Garbage Free City" has also been given to Vijayawada. Such a good ranking can be accredited to policy measures such as the introduction of waste disposal vehicles in the city by N. Chandrababu Naidu.

== Notable people ==
Notable people born in, or associated with, the city include:

- Nadeem Baig – Pakistani actor, singer and producer
- Siva S. Banda - Indian-American aerospace engineer.
- Saraswathi Gora – social activist who served as leader of the Atheist Centre
- Koneru Humpy - reigning women's world rapid Chess champion
- Lavanam – social reformer and Gandhian
- Prasad Murella, film cinematographer
- Rampilla Narasayamma – freedom fighter.
- Teja Nidamanuru - Indian-born cricketer who plays for the Netherlands national cricket team
- Dandamudi Rajagopal - Olympic weightlifter
- Vangaveeti Mohana Ranga - Vijayawada politician
- Ayyadevara Kaleswara Rao - freedom fighter and the first Speaker of the Legislative Assembly of Andhra Pradesh.
- Goparaju Ramachandra Rao – founder of Atheist Centre
- Kanuri Lakshmana Rao – three time MP from Vijayawada and Chief Engineer of Nagarjuna Sagar Dam
- N. T. Rama Rao – founder of Telugu Desam Party and actor in Telugu films
- Akkineni Nageswara Rao - Telugu film actor and founder of Annapurna Studios
- Viswanatha Satyanarayana- awarded the Jnanpith Award in 1970, the first for a Telugu writer, and Padma Bhushan in 1971
- Puchalapalli Sundarayya – founding member of Communist party (Marxist) and former MLA from Vijayawada
- Pingali Venkayya – creator of National Flag.

== See also ==
- List of educational institutions in Vijayawada-Guntur Region
- List of most populous cities in India
- List of cities in Andhra Pradesh by population
- Andhra Pradesh Reorganisation Act, 2014
- Largest Indian cities by GDP
