= Vijayawada East mandal =

- Mandal
- Interactive Map Outlining Vijayawada Urban mandals
- Location in Andhra Pradesh, India
- Coordinates: 16°29′40″N 80°39′47″E
- Country: India
- State: Andhra Pradesh
- District: NTR
- Headquarters: Patamata

Languages
  - Official: Telugu
- Time zone: UTC+5:30 (IST)

Vijayawada East mandal is one of the 20 mandals in the NTR district of the Indian state of Andhra Pradesh. It is one of the four mandals that formed from the Vijayawada Urban mandal after bifurcation in 2018 under the reorganization of revenue mandals. It is under the administration of Vijayawada revenue division, and the headquarters are located at Patamata.

== Wards/villages included ==
Municipal Divisions of 2,3,4,6,7,8,9,10,11,12,13 & 14 (12 Municipal Divisions)

1. Mogalrajapuram
2. Gunadala (Part)
3. Patamata
4. Currency Nagar
5. Gurunanak Nagar
6. Auto Nagar
7. Ayyapa Nagar
8. Ashok Nagar
