= One Town =

One Town may refer to:

- One Town, Eluru, a locality in Eluru, West Godavari district
- One Town, Vijayawada, a locality in Vijayawada, Krishna district
- One Town (Visakhapatnam), a locality in Visakhapatnam city
