= Nidamanuru, Vijayawada =

Nidamanuru
- Neighbourhood
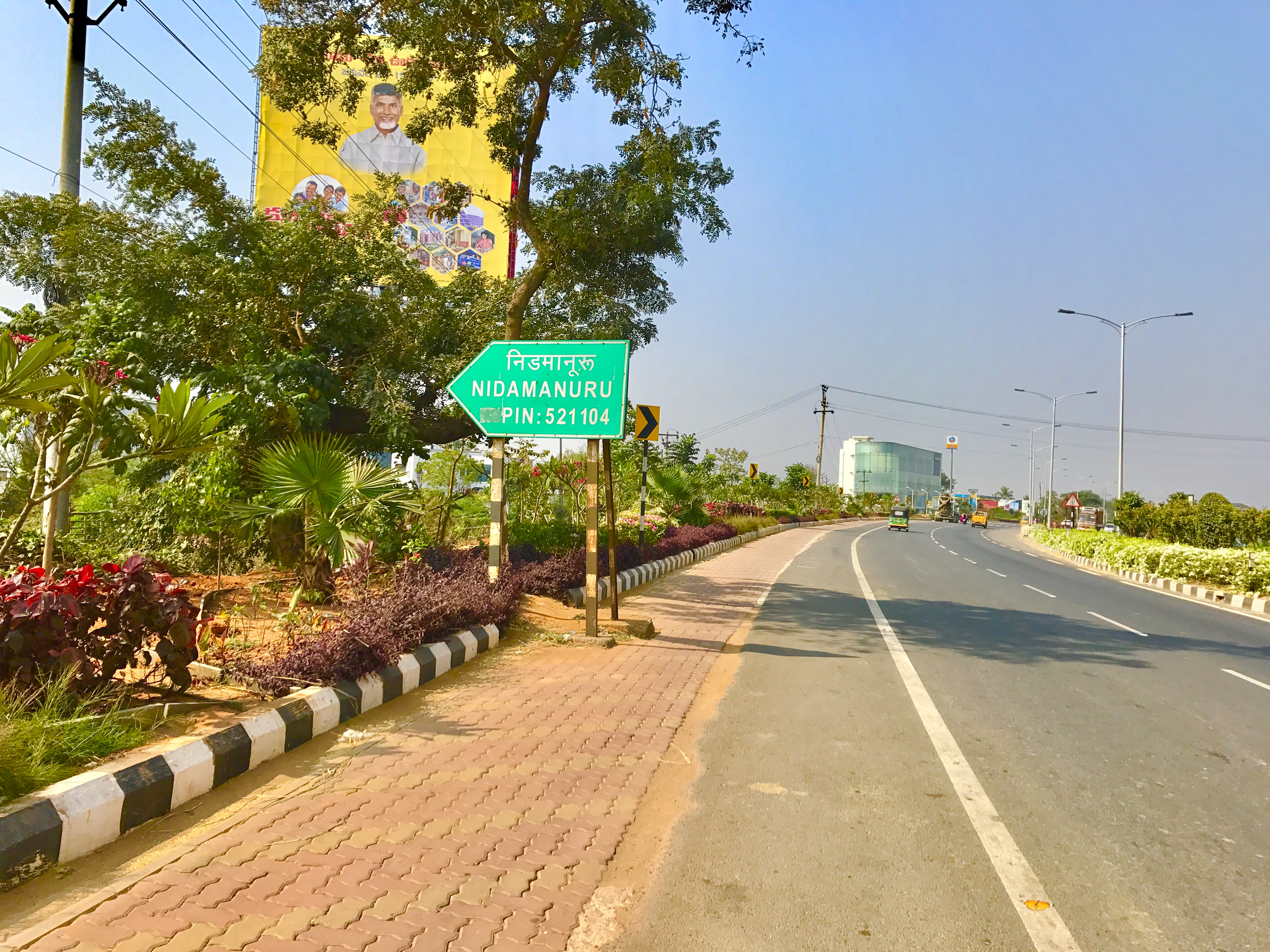
- AH-45 in Nidamanuru

- Location within Andhra Pradesh
- Coordinates: 16.5066°N 80.7222°E
- Country: India
- State: Andhra Pradesh
- Region: NTR
- District: NTR
- Mandal: Vijayawada Rural mandal
- City: Vijayawada
- Metropolitan Area: Andhra Pradesh Capital Region

Area
  - Total: 5.43 km^{2} (2.10 sq mi)
- Elevation: 21 m (69 ft)

Population (2011)
  - Total: 10,375
  - Density: 1,910/km^{2} (4,950/sq mi)
- Time zone: UTC+5:30 (IST)
- PIN: 521104
- Telephone code: +91-866

Nidamanur is a major residential area of Vijayawada in NTR district of the Indian state of Andhra Pradesh. It is one of major neighborhoods of Vijayawada. It is part of Greater Vijayawada and Vijayawada Metropolitan Area

== Geography ==
The Ryves Canal that originates from the Krishna river flows through the Nidamanur and is the main source of irrigation and drinking.It is bordered by Enikepadu in East, Gudavalli to the west, Poranki to the South nd Mustabad to North

== Transport ==
State runs APSRTC bus services from Bus stand to Nidamanuru. It lies on National Highway 16. Nidamanuru railway station serves with rail services. Nearest airport is Vijayawada international airport ( Gannavaram) which is 9KM away.

APSRTC City Bus Routes from Nidamanuru

Route number	Start	End	Via
11	Nidamanuru	Milk Project	Nidamanuru, Ramavarappadu, Benz Circle, Ring, ESI, Gunadala Vanthena, Gunadala Church, Padavalarevu, Anjaneya Swamy Temple, SRR, Maruthi, Kothavantena, Vijayatalkies, Besent Road, Lenine Center, Challapalli Bungalow, Bus Stand, KR Market, Milk Project
144	Nidamanuru	Kondapalli	Nidamanuru, Ramavarappadu, Benz Circle, Post Office Bus stop, Pnbs, Kondapalli
26H	Nidamanuru	Hb Colony	Nidamanuru, Ramavarappadu, Benz Circle, Igmc Stadium, Bandar Locks Bus Stop, Pnbs, KR Market Bus Stop, Hb Colony
29	Nidamanuru	Kaleswararao Market	Nidamanuru, Ramavarappadu, Benz Circle, Railway Station, Kaleswararao Market
31	Nidamanuru	Milk Project	Nidamanuru, Ramavarappadu, Benz Circle, Igmc Stadium, Bandar Locks Bus Stop, Old Bus Stand, Pnbs, KR Market Bus Stop, Milk Project
31H	Nidamanuru	Hb Colony	Nidamanuru, Ramavarappadu, Benz Circle, Igmc Stadium, Bandar Locks Bus Stop, Old Bus Stand, Pnbs, KR Market Bus Stop, Hb Colony
41v	Nidamanuru	Vombay Colony	Nidamanuru, Ramavarappadu, Benz Circle, Raghavaiah park, Cherllapalli Bunglow, Ajithsingh Nagar, Vombay Colony
5	Nidamanuru	Kabela	Nidamanuru, Ramavarappadu, Benz Circle, Ramesh Hospital Stop, Pushpa Hotel, Besent Road, Nakkal Road, Old Bus Stand, Bus Stand, Tummalapalli Kalkshetram, KR Market Bus Stop, Kabela
5SG	Nidamanuru	Railway Station	Nidamanuru, Ramavarappadu, Benz Circle, Ramesh Hospital Stop, Pushpa Hotel, Besent Road, Nakkal Road, Old Bus Stand, Railway Station
54	Nidamanuru	Railway Stn	Nidamanuru, Ramavarappadu, Benz Circle, Ramesh Hospital Stop, Vinayak Theatre, Maruthi Nagar, Vijaya Talkies, Railway Stn
5G	Nidamanuru	Kaleswararao Market	Nidamanuru, Ramavarappadu, Benz Circle, Ramesh Hospital Stop, Pushpa Hotel, Besent Road, Nakkal Road, Old Bus Stand, Bus Stand, Tummalapalli Kalkshetram, KR Market Bus Stop, Kaleswararao Market
7A	Nidamanuru	Kaleswararao Market	Nidamanuru, Ramavarappadu, Benz Circle, Igmc Stadium, Bandar Locks Bus Stop, Kaleswararao Market
7R	Nidamanuru	Milk Project	Nidamanuru, Ramavarappadu, Benz Circle, Igmc Stadium, Bandar Locks Bus Stop, Old Bus Stand, Pnbs, KR Market Bus Stop, Milk Project

== Education ==
School of Planning and Architecture was established by Ministry of Human Resource Development, Government of India. ZPHS Nidamanuru was one of the best govt schools in AP. It caters to the Enikepadu, Gudavalli etc. The school has 75yr old history to it. The literacy percentage of this town 95%. Currently Nidamanuru has couple of Intermediate pvt colleges like Narayana and Chaitanya. The town is very close to the engineering colleges like Siddhartha Engineering, PVP Siddhartha institute of technology, and SRK institute of technology. Nidamanuru has Delhi public school available for the CBSE. Reputed institutes like KKR Gowtham international school available for the residential schooling

== Industries ==
Nidamanuru has Model Dairy ( Dairy products), Model steels (currently closed)( Steel products), Incap ( capacitors limited)

Ashok Leyland, Vijayawada, and Pratap industries ( Steel and engineering products).
