= Mahatma Gandhi Road, Vijayawada =

Road in Vijayawada, India

MG Road
- Bandar Road
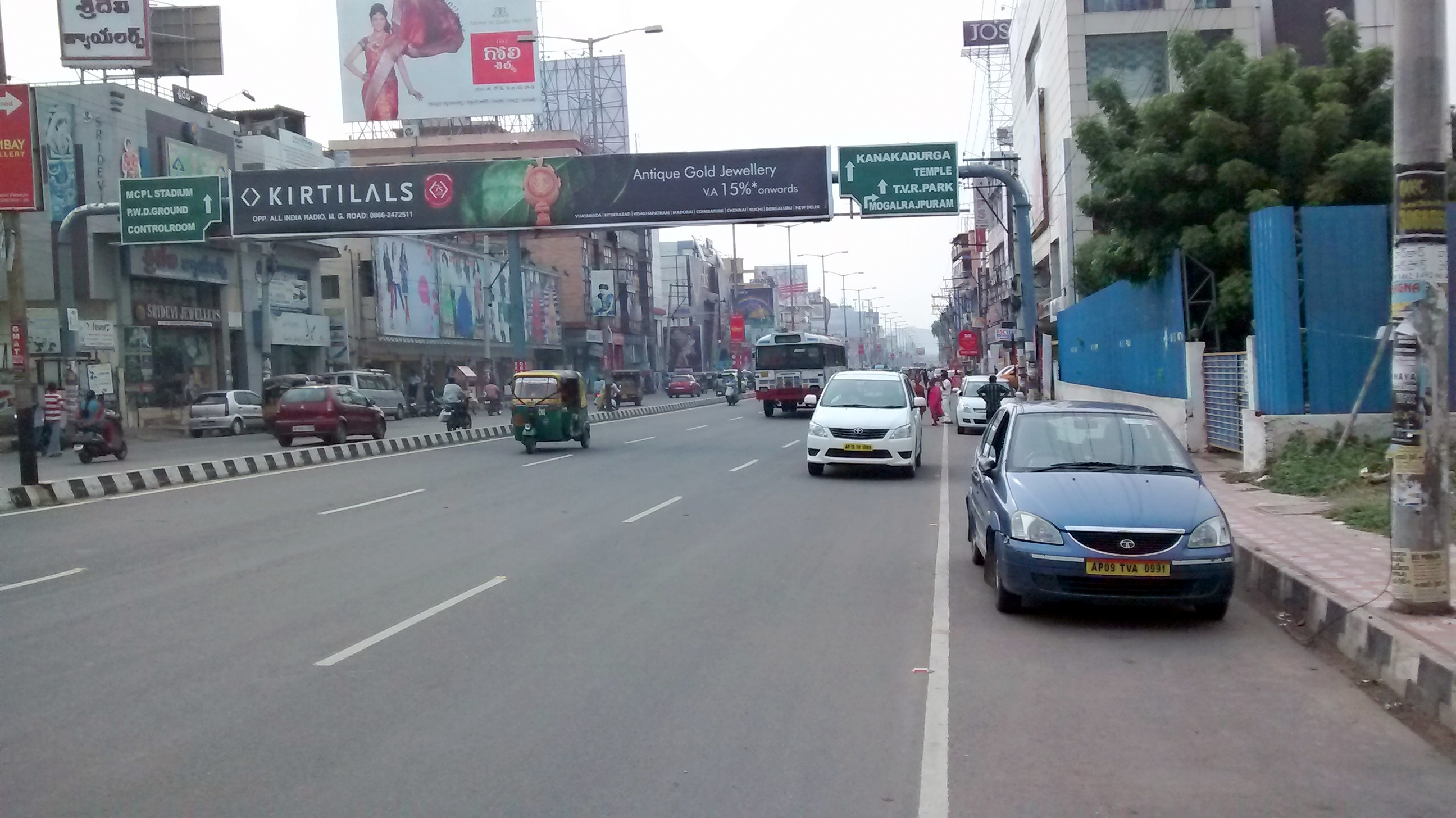
- Bandar Road in 2014
- Namesake: Mahatma Gandhi
- Maintained by: VMC
- Length: 2.5 mi (4.0 km)
- Width: 100 feet (30 m)
- Location: Vijayawada, Andhra Pradesh, India
- Major junctions: Benz Circle

Mahatma Gandhi Road (MG Road), popularly known as Bandar Road, is a boulevard and major road in the Indian city of Vijayawada.The road starts at Benz Circle, busiest traffic circle in the city and continues to Avatar Park, where it connects to Eluru Road which is also a major road. It runs almost parallel to the Bandar Canal. The National Highway 9 (NH 9) runs parallel to this road on the other side of the Bandar Canal, merging into Bandar Road at Benz Circle. The name "Bandar" was originally the name of Machilipatnam Road, which the current Bandar Road intersects.

Its official name comes from Mahatma Gandhi, the inspirational leader of the Indian Independence Movement in the early twentieth century.

== History ==
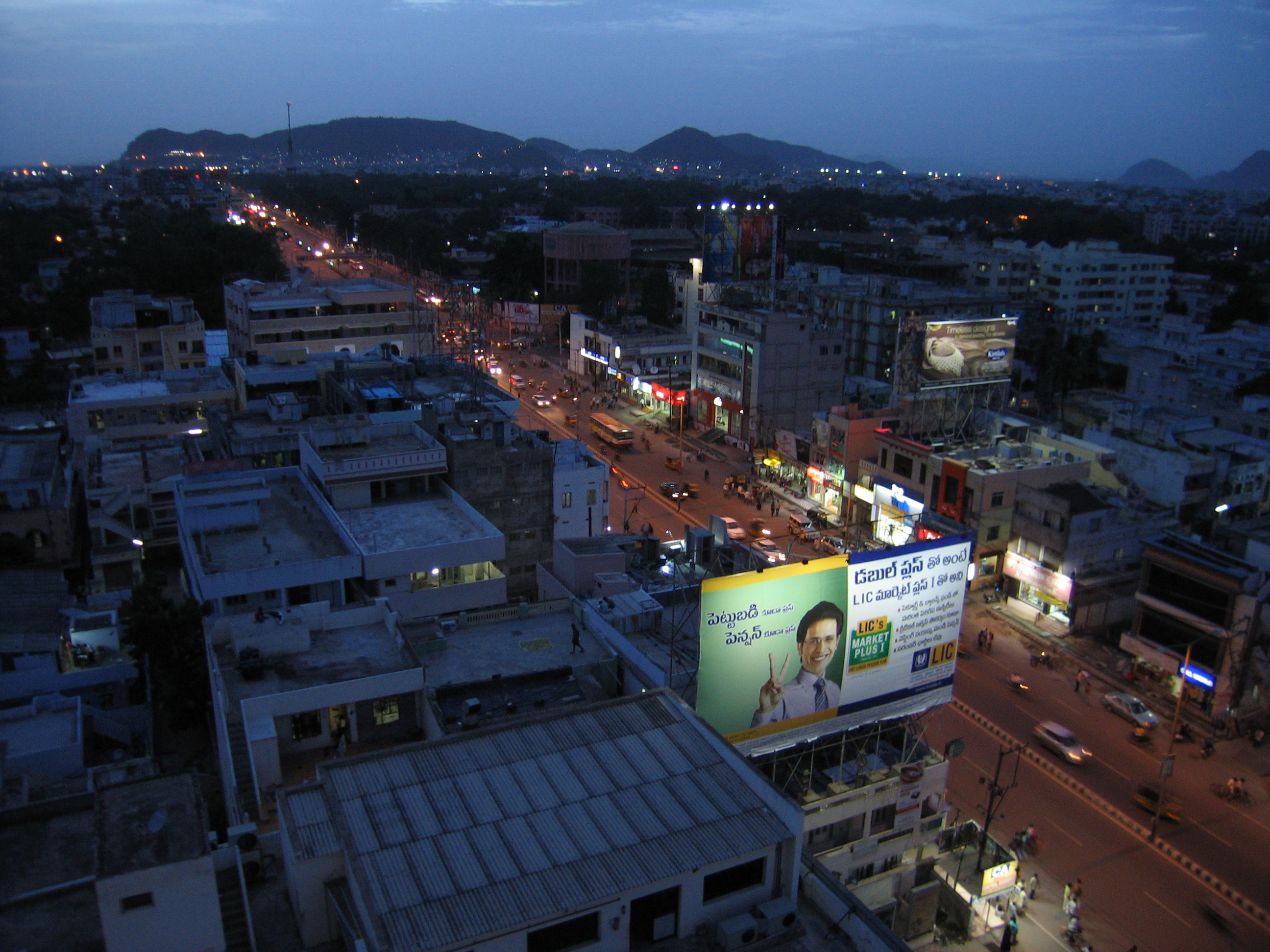
Bandar Road in Vijayawada

Bandar Road's has an average width of 100 feet (30 m) although it is not of uniform width throughout. This road's creation altered the landscape of Vijayawada and was the catalyst for the erection of Multiplexes and the Prominent Building.

== Golden Mile Project ==
MG Road in Vijayawada is home to the Golden Mile Project, India’s first smart street initiative. Covering a 2.9 km stretch from the Police Control Room to Benz Circle, it was launched as a Proof of Concept for the Smart City initiative by the Government of Andhra Pradesh. Supported by Cisco Systems, the project provides facilities such as free Wi-Fi, intelligent street lighting, smart parking, and digital kiosks. The total cost of ₹7.83 crore was shared between Cisco, the Andhra Pradesh Urban Finance & Infrastructure Development Corporation, and the Vijayawada Municipal Corporation. The project enables real-time monitoring through the City Digital Platform at the municipal office. It includes 101 surveillance cameras, with some capable of calculating traffic density and providing live reports. Additionally, 35 Wi-Fi access points and 240 smart solar-powered lights were installed for public use. Parking sensors help reduce congestion, and motion sensors manage traffic and detect violations. The project also introduced Remote Expert Government Services, allowing citizens to communicate with officials via video calls.

== Culture ==
MG road is the highly influential road in the city both culturally and economically. It is the destination for the city people for fun and entertainment because of its high end shopping malls, theaters, hotels, restaurants, food courts and cafes. It is also seat of Collector Office, Vijayawada. Indira Gandhi Stadium, Bapu Museum, Swaraj Maidan (PWD Grounds) are located on this road. Since December 2014, a midnight food court is organised on this road near Indira Gandhi Stadium until 2:30 am. and film theaters operate until 2 am, which results in crowd flow whole day. Many events in the city happens on this road like Happy Sunday and other people gatherings, marathons. City exhibition, Book Festival and other premium events are organised in PWD Grounds every year.

== Controversy ==
In December 2005, Vijayawada city officials decided to widen the road to 120 feet (37 m) without warning. This decision involved the immediate demolition of one wall of the Akashvani (All India Air) radio station and a neighboring bus shelter. The radio station, given no forewarning of this road expansion prior to the project's initiation, requested that the council order monetary compensation for the property's 411 yards (376 m) subsequent devaluation; and immediate reconstruction of the demolished wall.
