= Patamata =

- Neighbourhood
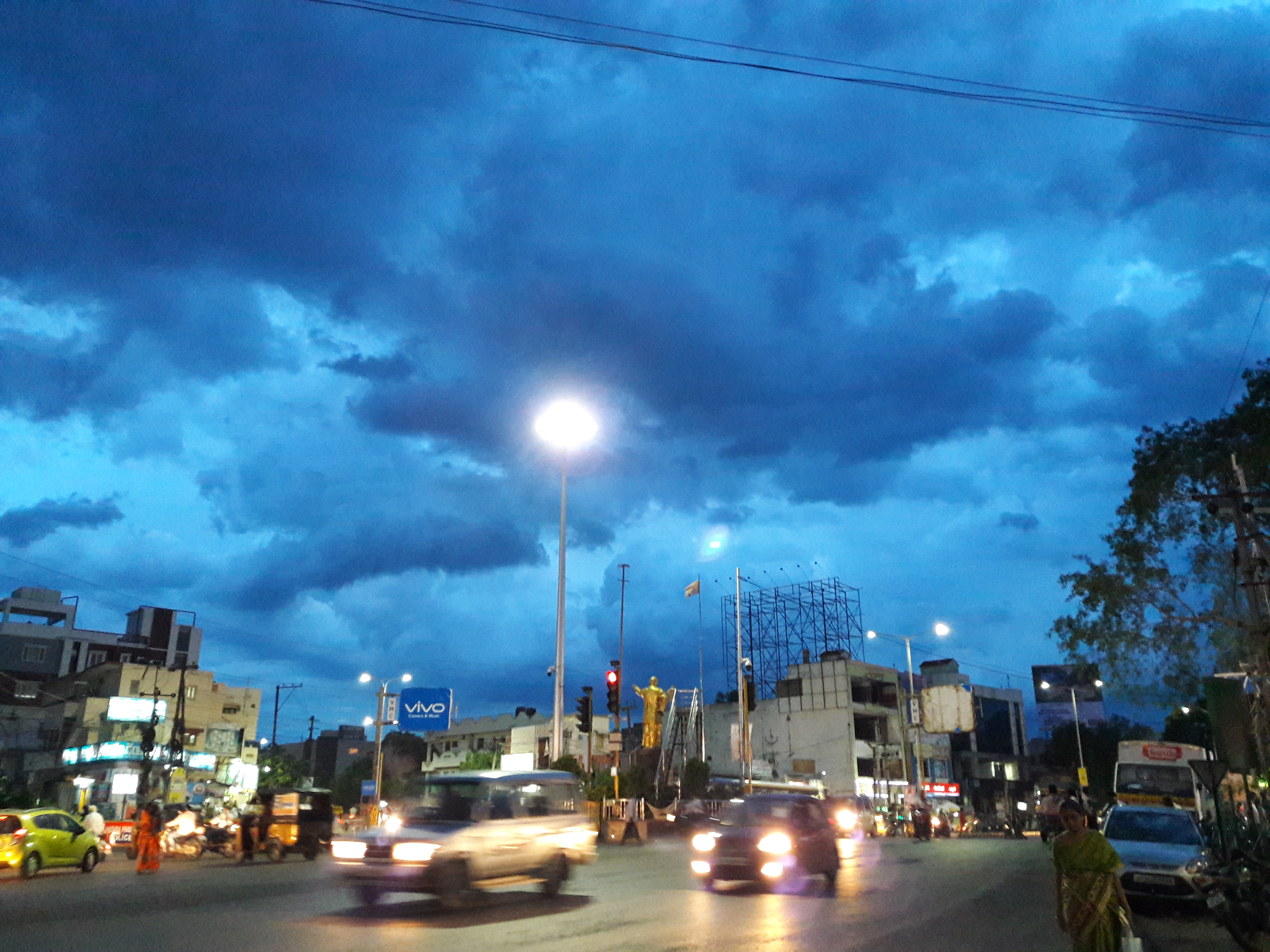
- NTR Circle, Patamata

- Location within Andhra Pradesh
- Coordinates: 16°29′40″N 80°39′47″E
- Country: India
- State: Andhra Pradesh
- District: NTR
- Mandal: Vijayawada East
- City: Vijayawada
- Metro: Andhra Pradesh Capital Region

Government
  - Type: Mayor–Council
  - Body: Vijayawada Municipal Corporation

Languages
  - Official: Telugu
- PIN: 520010
- Vehicle registration: AP-39

Patamata is an affluent suburban in centre part of Vijayawada, Andhra Pradesh, India. It is one of the most expensive commercial and residential locations in Vijayawada. The area contains shopping malls and jewellery shops. It has become a major transit point for traffic because it lies between Benz Circle and Auto Nagar. It falls under the 12th ward of Vijayawada Municipal Corporation and the present corporator is Sambaiah. It is an unreserved ward for women candidates.

== Transport ==
Numerous city buses are operated throughout the city, serving various areas and neighborhoods. These buses provide convenient transportation options for residents and visitors alike. The extensive bus network ensures that people can easily travel to their desired destinations within the city.
