= Karl Marx Road, Vijayawada =

Road in Andhra Pradesh, India

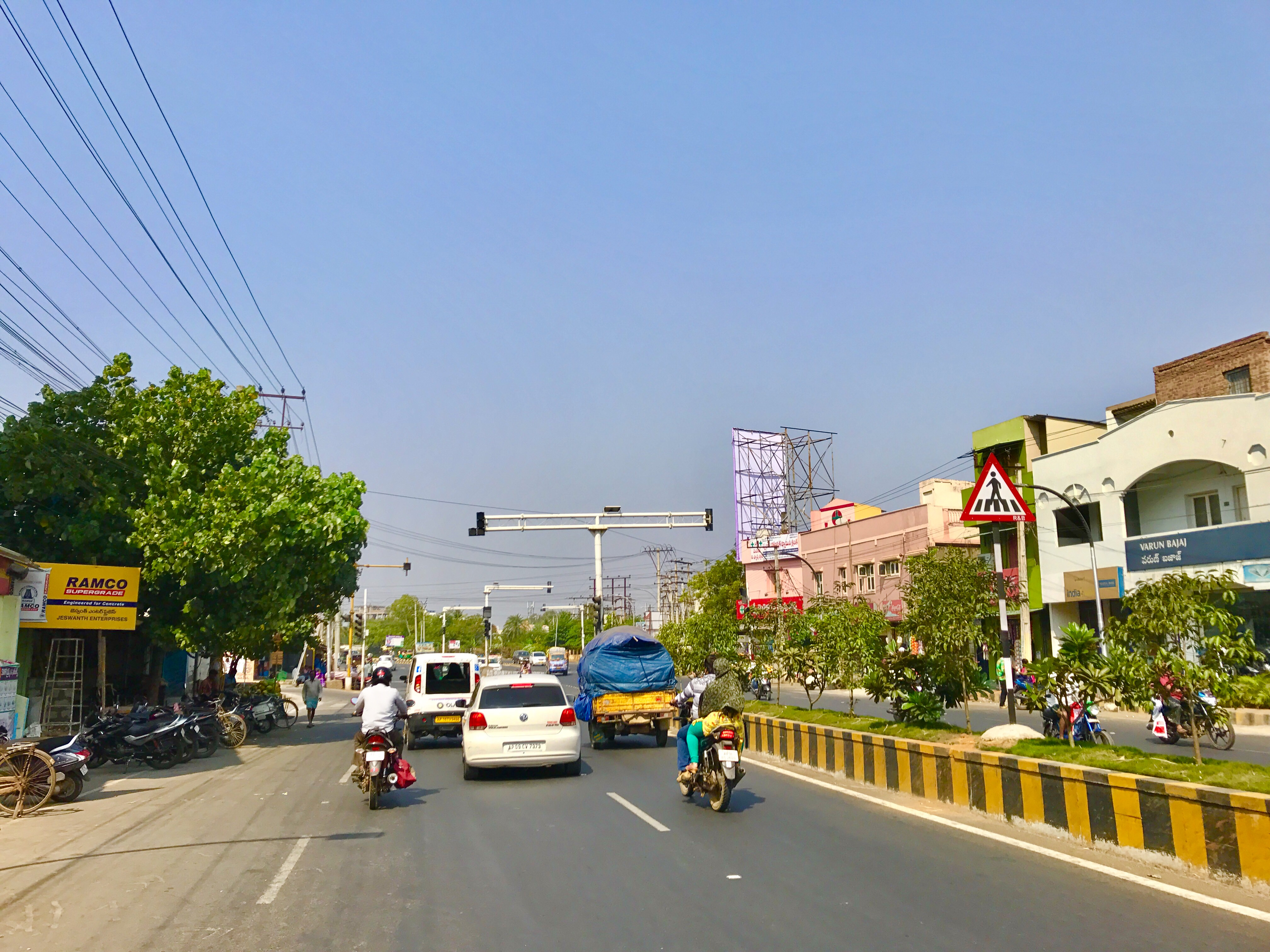
Karl Marx road near BRTS road junction

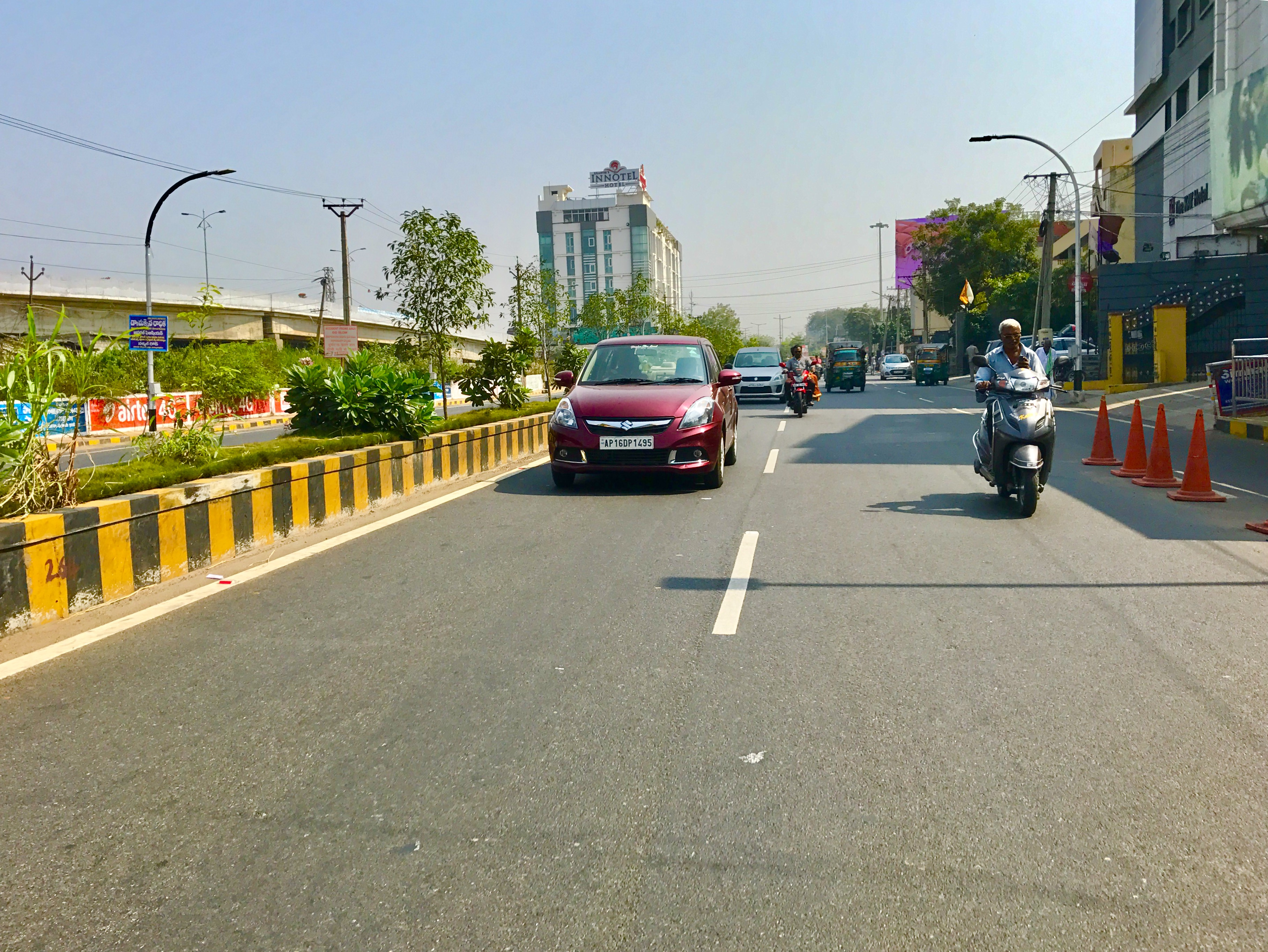
Karl Marx road near Inner Ring road junction

Karl Marx road, also known as Eluru road, is one of the two major roads in the Indian city of Vijayawada, Andhra Pradesh, the other being M.G Road. Karl Max Road runs from the old bus depot to a city named Eluru in West Godavari district. MG Road diverges into Bandar Road and Karl max Road near the police control room in Governorpeta. This road runs generally parallel to the Ryves Canal and joins NH5 at Ramavarappadu Ring at the city's official limits.
