= Ayyadevara Kaleswara Rao =

Indian freedom fighter and politician (1882–1962)

Ayyadevara Kaleswara Rao (22 January 1882 – 23 February 1962) was an Indian freedom fighter and the first Speaker of the Legislative Assembly of Andhra Pradesh. He was born in Nandigama village, Krishna district, then in Madras Presidency, British India, and now a part of the state of Andhra Pradesh. The Kaleswara Rao market in Vijayawada was named in his honour.

== Early life ==
Rao was born into a family of revenue collectors. He moved with his mother and wife to Machilipatnam, where he studied F.A. at Noble College, Machilipatnam. He was taught there by Raghupathi Venkataratnam Naidu.

Rao and his friends laid the foundation for Andhra Granthalayodyamam (Library movement) by starting Ram Mohana Granthalayam at Mahatma Gandhi Road, Vijayawada in 1911. He was also the founding member of Vignyana Chandrika, a literary society to fund and encourage original literary works in Telugu and also translations from European and other Indian languages in to Telugu.

== Career as a lawyer ==
Rao moved to Madras along with his mother and wife to join the Law College in early 1904 and he studied B.L. until the following year. Thereafter, he rejected opportunities to become Revenue Inspector and District Munsif because he did not want to work for the British Raj. In June 1906, he started his career as a lawyer in Vijayawada. On 21 March 1921, on the instructions on Mahatma Gandhi, he left the legal profession in order to take part in the Indian independence movement and never took up law again.

== Political career ==
Rao was the speaker of Andhra Pradesh Legislative Assembly from 1956 to 1962.
