= Ramavarappadu =

- Neighbourhood
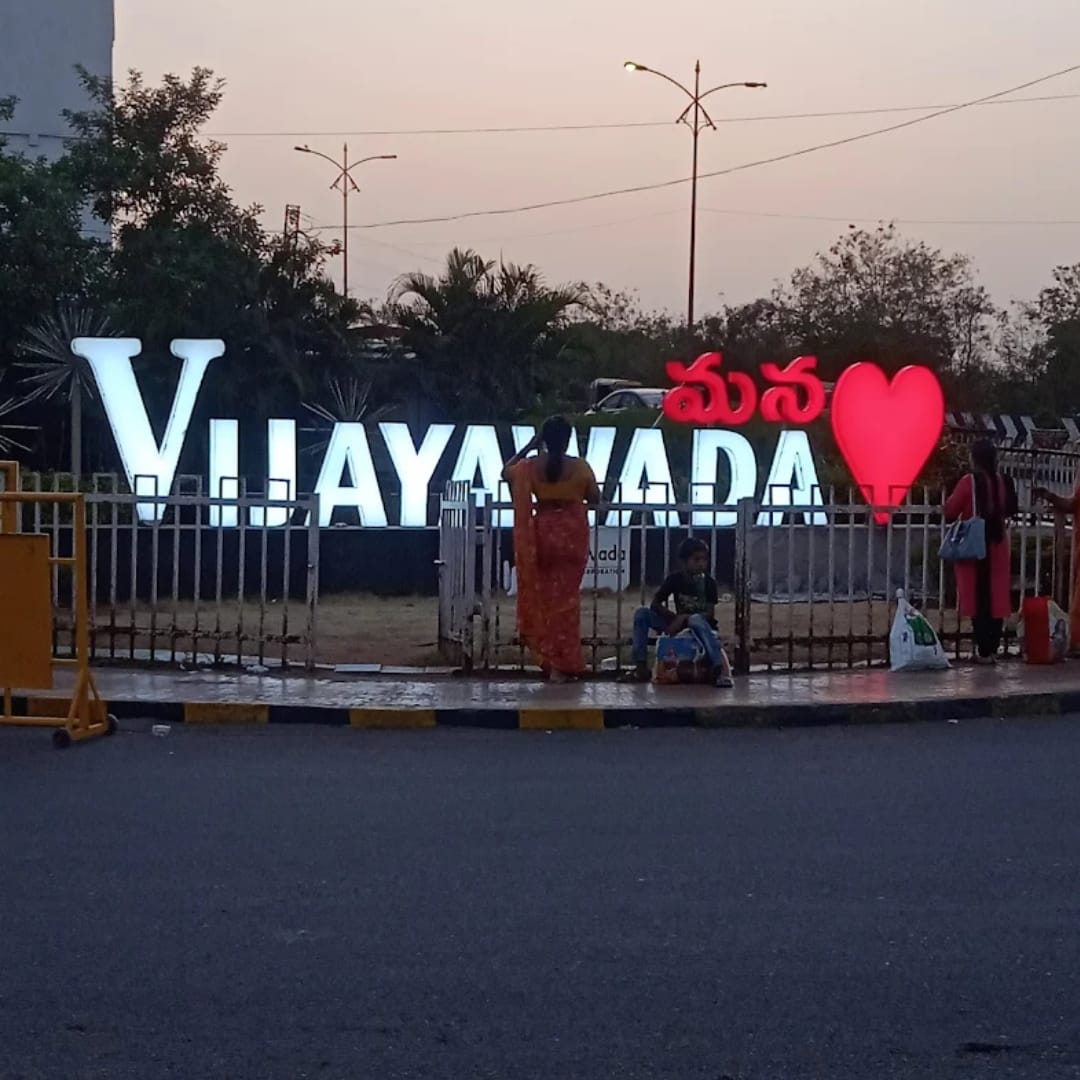
- Vijayawada Sign Board at Ramavarappadu Ring
- Interactive map of Ramavarappadu
- Location within Andhra Pradesh
- Coordinates: 16.5256°N 80.6772°E
- Country: India
- State: Andhra Pradesh
- Region: Coastal Andhra
- District: NTR
- Mandal: Vijayawada Rural mandal
- City: Vijayawada
- Metropolitan Area: Andhra Pradesh Capital Region

Area
  - Total: 3.30 km^{2} (1.27 sq mi)
- Elevation: 18 m (59 ft)

Population (2011)
  - Total: 22,222
  - Density: 6,730/km^{2} (17,400/sq mi)
- Time zone: UTC+5:30 (IST)
- PIN: 521108
- Telephone code: +91-866
- Parliament constituencies: Machilipatnam
- Sasana Sabha constituencies: Gannavaram

Ramavarappadu is a residential hub located in the East-Central part of Vijayawada in NTR district of the Indian state of Andhra Pradesh. It is one of the major locality of the City. The nearest localities to Ramavarappadu are Currency Nagar, Gunadala, Prasadampadu

== Demographics ==
As of 2011 Census of India, the town had a population of 22,222. The total population constitute, 11,092 males, 11,130 females and 2,316 children, in the age group of 0–6 years. The average literacy rate stands at 81.02% with 16,127 literates, significantly higher than the national average of 73.00%.

== Education ==
The primary and secondary school education is imparted by government, aided and private schools, under the School Education Department of the state.

== See also ==
- List of census towns in Andhra Pradesh
