= Navuduru =

- Village
- Interactive map of Navuduru
- Location in Andhra Pradesh, India
- Country: India
- State: Andhra Pradesh

Population (2011)
  - Total: 3,218

Languages
  - Official: Telugu
- Time zone: UTC+5:30 (IST)
- PIN: 534240
- Telephone code: 08816
- Vehicle registration: AP-37

Navuduru is a village in Veeravasaram mandal, located in West Godavari district of the Indian state of Andhra Pradesh.

== Demographics ==
As of 2011 Census of India, Navuduru had a population of 3218. The total population constitute, 1607 males and 1611 females with a sex ratio of 1002 females per 1000 males. 304 children are in the age group of 0–6 years, with sex ratio of 1013. The average literacy rate stands at 76.46%. pincode is 534240
