= Ryves Canal =

- Interactive map of Ryves Canal

Specifications
- Status: Open

Geography
- Branch of: Krishna left bank canal

Ryves Canal is a canal that originates from the Krishna River and flows through the city of Vijayawada in the Indian state of Andhra Pradesh. Under the Krishna Eastern canal system, there are three gravity canals, namely the Eluru canal, Ryves canal and Bandar (Machilipatnam) canal were dug during British time, mainly for irrigation and navigation purposes. The Ryves canal has a length of 57.70 km and an anicut of 1,75,000 acres with a designed discharge of 4250 cusecs.

== History ==
There was a disastrous famine during 1833 which wiped about 40% of the population in Krishna district. The government under East India Company constructed an anicut and canal system during 1852-55 to irrigate 5.80 lakh acres with an expenditure of Rs 0.772 million. The anicut proposal was formulated and designed by Sir Arthur Cotton and carried out by Captain Charles Orr. The anicut served for about 100 years and a major breach occurred in September 1952. A new barrage namely Prakasam barrage was constructed during 1952-77 replacing the damaged and breached Krishna anicut.

The canal is named after captain Joseph Gore Ryves, a british engineer who worked during construction of Krishna anicut. He was famous for the construction of mullaperiyar dam in Kerala. Initially Ryves canal used to start from 7th mile of Eluru canal. Later it was changed to start from the main canal near the barrage itself.
