= Mogalrajapuram =

- City Centre
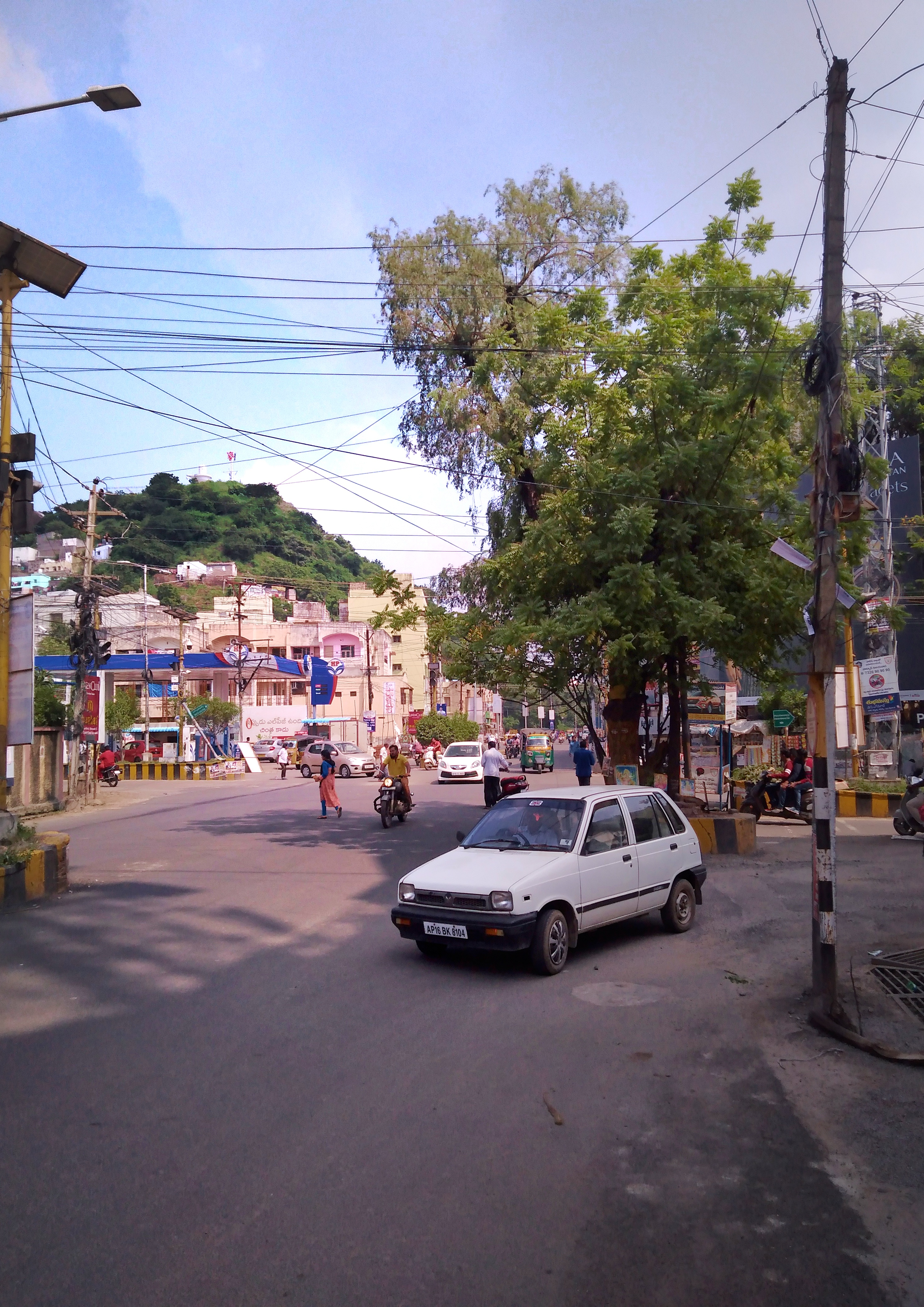
- Jammi chetu centre, Magalrajpuram

- Location in Andhra Pradesh, India
- Coordinates: 16.511°N 80.64°E
- Country: India
- State: Andhra Pradesh
- District: NTR
- Metro: Vijayawada

Languages
  - Official: Telugu
- Time zone: UTC+5:30 (IST)
- PIN: 520010
- Telephone code: 0866
- Vehicle registration: AP16
- Lok Sabha constituency: Vijayawada

Mogalrajapuram is a major residential and commercial area in Vijayawada. It is one of the shopping district of the city. It is located at centre of Vijayawada beside low range hills.The area consists of many shopping malls.The area is well connected to the other places of city Suryaraopet, Governorpet, Beasent Road, Gunadala, Benz circle Ramavarappadu

== History ==
Mogalrajapuram is a Vijayawada locality renowned for its historical temples and rich cultural legacy. It is thought that the Mogalarajapuram Caves, which contain historic rock-cut shrines devoted to Lord Shiva, are the source of the name "Mogalrajapuram." Some of the earliest examples of rock-cut architecture in South India can be found in these caves, which date back to the fifth century CE. Legends about the Pandavas carving the caves during their exile and a sage called Mogalaraju meditating there have left Mogalrajapuram a hallowed site for devotees. The town has a wealth of folklore.

Moreover, the region has been linked to the Vijayanagara Empire, as it was a significant hub for trade, literature, and the arts under King Krishnadevaraya's rule. Mogalrajapuram has experienced a number of notable transformations over time, including its long history, religious importance, architectural legacy, cultural changes, urbanization, and celebration of festivals. Devotees of Goddess Kanaka Durga flock to the Kanaka Durga Temple, a significant landmark, particularly during the Navaratri festival. Mogalrajapuram has seen significant changes in the last few decades due to urbanization, with newer commercial buildings, residential complexes, and infrastructure taking the place of some older buildings. Mogalrajapuram's cultural fabric is still deeply woven by events like the Sri Subramanya Swamy Kalyanotsavam and the Mogalrajapuram Mariamman Festival
