= One Town, Vijayawada =

One Town
- Neighbourhood
- Location in Andhra Pradesh, India
- Coordinates: 16.511°N 80.64°E
- Country: India
- State: Andhra Pradesh
- District: Krishna
- Metro: Vijayawada

Languages
  - Official: Telugu, Hindi, Marwadi, Urdu
- Time zone: UTC+5:30 (IST)
- Vidhan Sabha constituency: Bhavani Puram
- Lok Sabha constituency: Vijayawada

One Town (or Old Town) is a commercial area of the city of Vijayawada. It is a part of Old Town area of the city. Arjuna Veedhi, Islampet, Jendachettu Centre, Kamsalipet, Rajarajeswaripet, Kothapet, Ajithsinghnagar, Jendachettu Centre and Winchipet are some of the areas under I–Town.

The I–Town police station and Kothapeta police station has its jurisdiction over this area. Archaeological Survey of India office, Akkanna-Madanna caves and the Gosala are some of the notable structures situated in this area.

== Demographics ==
Languages (2011)
1. Telugu 84.09 (83.1%)
2. Hindi 11.34 (11.2%)
3. Urdu 4.17 (4.12%)
4. Marwari 1.64 (1.62%)
