= Administration of Vijayawada =

Local government in Andhra Pradesh, India

The Vijayawada Municipal Corporation is in charge of the civic administration and infrastructure of the city of Vijayawada. The corporation was formed in 1981 by upgrading from municipality status. Many other neighbourhoods were later merged into the corporation limits to a total area of 61.88 km^{2} (23.89 sq mi), located in Krishna district. It is adjoined by the Legislative capital of Andhra Pradesh, Amaravati. It was also been part of Andhra Pradesh Capital Region. The Vijayawada Municipal Corporation is divided into 77 wards. Each ward is headed by a corporator, elected by popular vote. The corporators elect The City Mayor who is the titular head of the corporation. Its executive powers lie with the Municipal Commissioner appointed by the Government of Andhra Pradesh. The Andhra Pradesh State Election Commission monitors the municipal elections that are held in the city once in every five years. The last elections were held on 10 March 2021.

The Vijayawada City Police, established in 1983, is the law and order enforcement agency. Vijayawada Police commissionerate jurisdiction is divided into six police zones and is extended in an area of 1211.16 km^{2}, including the neighbouring areas. The Vijayawada Traffic Police is headed by a Deputy Commissioner who is answerable to the Vijayawada City Police Commissioner. The present Police commissioner is S. V. Rajashekhar Babu IPS .

Vijayawada is the headquarters of Andhra Pradesh Capital Region Development Authority. The metropolitan area covers Vijayawada municipal corporation and merged villages of Ramavarappadu, Prasadampadu, Enikepadu, Nidamanuru, Done Atkuru, Gudavalli, Kesarapalle, Ajjampudi, Buddavaram, Gannavaram, Nunna, Pathapadu, Phiryadi Nainavaram, Ambapuram, Jakkampudi, Buddavaram, Ambapuram, Yenamalakuduru, Kanuru, Tadigadapa, Poranki, Penamaluru.The urban agglomeration spread in Guntur district covers Tadepalle Municipality and its outgrowth of Undavalli; Mangalagiri Municipality and its outgrowths of Navuluru and Atmakur. Headquarters of many state government offices and buildings are situated in the city, including the Raj Bhavan. As per the G.O. 104 (dated:23-03-2017), the state government had declared Vijayawada Municipal Corporation and its contiguous areas as a metropolitan area of Vijayawada. The city contains three Andhra Pradesh assembly constituencies and a constituency of the Lok Sabha, i.e., Vijayawada (Lok Sabha constituency).

== Utility services ==
Water supply from the 59 water reservoirs, maintenance of roads, sewerage, underground drainage, environment protection programs, recycling of solid waste and producing power are the services provided by the Vijayawada Municipal Corporation. There has been an underground drainage system in the city since 1967–68. Many green parks are maintained by the corporation to protect the environment such as Raghavaiah park, Rajiv Gandhi Park, Dr. B.R Ambedkar Park, Mahatma Gandhi Park etc. The corporation won many awards and achievements such as National Urban Water Award (2009), Siti e-Governance Project, ISO 9001 certification for Quality Management System.

The Andhra Pradesh State Disaster Response and Fire Services Department with its headquarters in the city is responsible for protecting from fire accidents that occur during summers on the hill slope areas of the city.

== Environment ==
The report on solid waste generation in 46 metro cities for the year 2015–16 shows Vijayawada produces 550 tonnes of solid waste per day. Vijayawada is one of the cities to be covered under the Solar/Green Cities scheme launched by the Ministry of New and Renewable Energy and is one of the 15 cities in the country listed in Pilot Solar Cities. In 2007, the Andhra Pradesh State Road Transport Corporation (APSRTC) that operates the city's public transport system introduced less-polluting CNG fueled public transport busses in a drive to reduce the operational cost and protect the environment. In 2019, with the cost of CNG and fleet maintenance on the rise, the APSRTC had begun replacing the CNG run busses with BS4 and BS6 standard diesel-fueled buses. However, APSRTC continues to be committed to alternative fuels for its fleet. It has since added more electric, and biodiesel fueled busses. Likewise, the city has a large number of CNG fueled auto-rickshaws that support public transportation needs. However, auto-rickshaw operators have frequently suffered disruption in CNG supply and usually endure long queues to refuel. In February 2020, Piaggio Vehicles Private Limited launched the sale of electric auto-rickshaws in the city.
