= Kesineni =

Kesineni (Telugu: కేశినేని) is a Telugu surname. Notable people with the surname include:

- Kesineni Chinni (born 1969), Indian entrepreneur and politician
- Kesineni Nani (born 1966), Indian entrepreneur and politician
