= Vijayawada Lok Sabha constituency =

Lok Sabha constituency in Andhra Pradesh, India

Coordinates: 16.5°N 80.6°E

Vijayawada AP-12
- Lok Sabha constituency
- Interactive Map Outlining Vijayawada Lok Sabha constituency

Constituency details
- Country: India
- Region: South India
- State: Andhra Pradesh
- Assembly constituencies: Tiruvuru; Vijayawada West; Vijayawada Central; Vijayawada East; Mylavaram; Nandigama; Jaggayyapeta
- Established: 1952
- Reservation: None

Member of Parliament
- 18th Lok Sabha
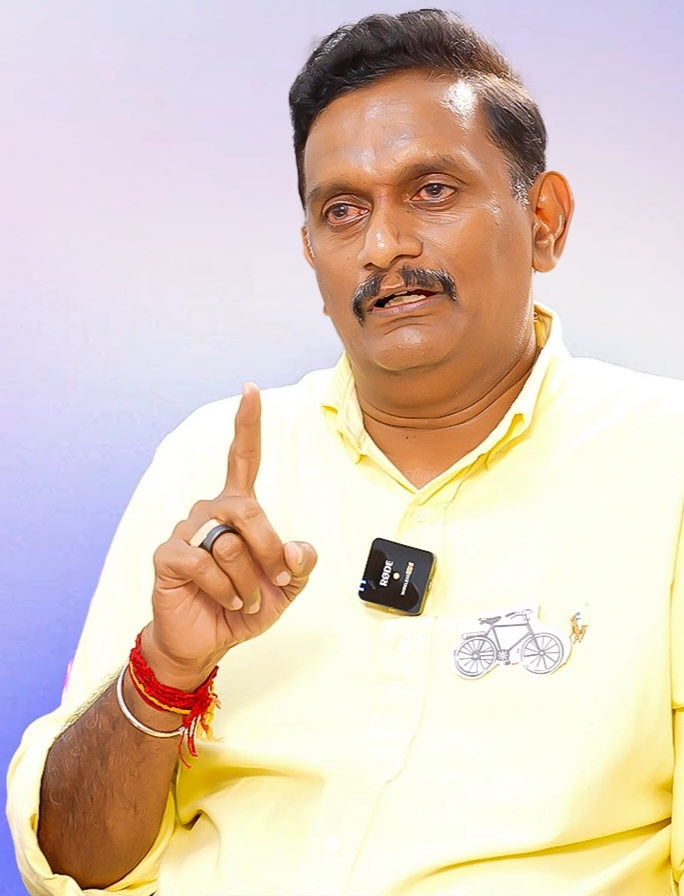
- Incumbent Kesineni Sivanath (Chinni)
- Party: TDP
- Alliance: NDA
- Elected year: 2024
- Preceded by: Kesineni Srinivas

Vijayawada Lok Sabha constituency is one of the twenty-five lok sabha constituencies of Andhra Pradesh in India. It comprises seven assembly segments and belongs to NTR district.

Most successful political parties
1. INC (11 terms) (58.0%)
2. TDP (6 terms) (32.0%)
3. INC(I) (1 term) (5.00%)
4. Independent (1 term) (5.00%)

== Assembly segments ==
Vijayawada constituency presently comprises the following Legislative Assembly segments:

No	Name	District	Member	Party	Leading (in 2024)
69	Tiruvuru (SC)	NTR	Kolikapudi Srinivasa Rao	TDP	TDP
79	Vijayawada West	NTR	Sujana Chowdary	BJP	TDP
80	Vijayawada Central	NTR	Bonda Umamaheswara Rao	TDP	TDP
81	Vijayawada East	NTR	Gadde Rama Mohan	TDP	TDP
82	Mylavaram	NTR	Vasantha Krishna Prasad	TDP	TDP
83	Nandigama (SC)	NTR	Tangirala Sowmya	TDP	TDP
84	Jaggayyapeta	NTR	Rajagopal Sreeram	TDP	TDP

== Members of parliament ==
Year	Member	Party
1952	Harindranath Chattopadhyaya	Independent
1957	Dr. Komarraju Atchamamba	Indian National Congress
1962	Kanuri Lakshmana Rao	Indian National Congress
1967	Kanuri Lakshmana Rao	Indian National Congress
1971	Kanuri Lakshmana Rao	Indian National Congress
1977	Godey Murahari	Indian National Congress
1980	Chennupati Vidya	Indian National Congress (I)
1984	Vadde Sobhanadreeswara Rao	Telugu Desam Party
1989	Chennupati Vidya	Indian National Congress
1991	Vadde Sobhanadreeswara Rao	Telugu Desam Party
1996	Parvathaneni Upendra	Indian National Congress
1998	Parvathaneni Upendra	Indian National Congress
1999	Gadde Rama Mohan	Telugu Desam Party
2004	Rajagopal Lagadapati	Indian National Congress
2009	Rajagopal Lagadapati	Indian National Congress
2014	Kesineni Srinivas (Nani)	Telugu Desam Party
2019	Kesineni Srinivas (Nani)	Telugu Desam Party
2024	Kesineni Sivanath (Chinni)	Telugu Desam Party

== Election results ==
=== General Election 1989 ===
General Election, 1989: Vijayawada
Party	Candidate	Votes	%	±%
INC	Vidya Chennupati	423,867	53.01	+6.60
TDP	Vadde Sobhanadreeswarra Rao	365,663	45.73	−5.24
Majority		58,204	6.39	
Turnout		799,626	72.29	+0.09
INC gain from TDP		Swing		

=== General Election 1991 ===
General Election, 1991: Vijayawada
Party	Candidate	Votes	%	±%
TDP	Vadde Sobhanadreeswarra Rao	326,890	48.89	+3.16
INC	Vidya Chennupati	290,669	43.47	−9.54
Majority		36,211	5.42	
Turnout		668,647	60.53	+0.09
TDP gain from INC		Swing		

=== General Election 1996 ===
General Election, 1996: Vijayawada
Party	Candidate	Votes	%	±%
INC	P. Upendra	397,709	45.16	+1.69
TDP	Vadde Sobhanadreeswarra Rao	283,435	32.18	−16.71
NTRTDP(LP)	Rajasekhar Devineni	169,199	19.21	
Majority		114,274	12.98	
Turnout		880,741	65.19	+4.66
INC gain from TDP		Swing		

=== General Election 1998 ===
General Election, 1998: Vijayawada
Party	Candidate	Votes	%	±%
INC	P. Upendra	405,062	45.02	−0.14
TDP	Jai Ramesh Dasari	374,995	41.68	+9.50
BJP	Vadde Ramakrishna Prasad	104,630	11.63	+10.27
Majority		30,067	3.34	
Turnout		899,683	66.88	+1.69
INC hold		Swing		

=== General Election 1999 ===
General Election, 1999: Vijayawada
Party	Candidate	Votes	%	±%
TDP	Gadde Ramamohan	482,968	51.96	+10.28
INC	P. Upendra	395,902	42.59	−2.43
Majority		87,096	9.37	
Turnout		929,476	67.14	+0.26
TDP gain from INC		Swing		

=== General Election 2004 ===
General Election, 2004: Vijayawada
Party	Candidate	Votes	%	±%
INC	Rajagopal Lagadapati	519,624	54.95	+12.36
TDP	Aswani Dutt	405,037	42.84	−9.12
BSP	Nandeti Prabhakar Rao	6,472	0.68	
Pyramid Party of India	Koneru Vara Lakshmi	5,105	0.54	+0.24
Independent	Someswara Rao Madala	3,039	0.32	
Independent	Syed Moinuddin	1,443	0.15	
TRS	J Ramchandra Rao	1,268	0.13	
Independent	Ravi Kumar Domakonda	1,005	0.11	
Independent	Jakka Taraka Mallikarjuna Rao	637	0.07	
Independent	Apparao Damalapati	549	0.06	
Independent	Gatla Venkata Narayana Reddy	493	0.05	
Independent	Donepudi Srinivas	482	0.05	
Independent	Gottumukkala Siva Prasadaraju	396	0.04	
Majority		114,487	12.11	
Turnout		945,550	64.56	−2.58
INC gain from TDP		Swing	+12.36	

=== General Election 2009 ===
General Election, 2009: Vijayawada
Party	Candidate	Votes	%	±%
INC	Rajagopal Lagadapati	429,394	39.46	−15.49
TDP	Vamsi Mohan Vallabhaneni	416,682	38.30	−4.54
PRP	Rajiv Chanumolu	164,666	15.13	
LSP	Devineni Kishore Kumar	20,880	1.92	
BJP	Laka Vengala Rao	15,951	1.47	
Independent	Boppa Venkateswara Rao	6,978	0.64	
Independent	Bolisetty Haribabu	5,608	0.52	
Independent	Veerla Sanjeeva Rao	4,615	0.42	
BSP	Sistla Narasimha Murthy	4,585	0.42	−0.26
Pyramid Party of India	Raghava Rao Jakka	3,227	0.30	−0.24
Independent	Senapathi Chiranjeevi	2,803	0.26	
Independent	Jakka Taraka Mallikharjuna Rao	2,419	0.22	+0.16
Independent	Appikatla Jawahar	1,931	0.18	
Independent	Shaik Mastan	1,884	0.17	
Independent	Deverasetty Ravindra Babu	1,596	0.15	
Independent	Baipudi Nageswara Rao	1,400	0.13	
Independent	Venkata Rao P.	1,033	0.09	
Independent	Perupogu Venkateswara Rao	927	0.09	
Independent	Krishna Murthy Sunkara	868	0.08	
Independent	Devireddy Ravindranatha Reddy	850	0.08	
Majority		12,712	1.17	
Turnout		1,088,297	77.61	+13.05
INC hold		Swing		

=== General Election 2014 ===
General Election, 2014: Vijayawada
Party	Candidate	Votes	%	±%
TDP	Kesineni Srinivas (Nani)	592,696	49.59	+11.30
YSRCP	Koneru Rajendra Prasad	517,834	43.72	+43.72
INC	Avinash Devineni	39,751	3.33	−36.13
AAP	Harmohinder Singh Sahni	3,088	0.26	
NOTA	None of the Above	5,290	0.44	
Majority		74,862	6.26	
Turnout		1,195,075	76.39	−1.22
TDP gain from INC		Swing		

=== General Election 2019 ===
2019 Indian general elections: Vijayawada
Party	Candidate	Votes	%	±%
TDP	Kesineni Srinivas (Nani)	575,498	45.04	−4.55
YSRCP	Prasad V Potluri	566,772	44.36	0.64
JSP	Muthamsetti Sudhakar	81,650	6.39	
Majority		8,726	0.68%	−5.87%
Turnout		12,77,775	77.30	
Registered electors		16,52,994		
TDP hold		Swing		

=== General Election 2024 ===
2024 Indian general elections: Vijayawada
Party	Candidate	Votes	%	±%
TDP	Kesineni Chinni	794,154	58.21	
YSRCP	Kesineni Srinivas	5,12,069	37.53	
INC	Valluru Bhargav	24,106	1.77	
NOTA	None of the above	9,193	0.67	
Majority		2,82,085	20.68	
Turnout		13,71,102	80.44	
TDP hold		Swing		

== See also ==
- List of constituencies of the Andhra Pradesh Legislative Assembly
