= Velagapudi (disambiguation) =

Velagapudi is a neighbourhood and a part of Urban Notified Area of Amaravati.

Velagapudi may also refer to:

- Velagapudi Ramakrishna Siddhartha Engineering College, an engineering college in Vijayawada, Andhra Pradesh
- Velagapudi Ramakrishna, an Indian Civil Service (ICS) officer, industrialist, and philanthropist.
