= Vijayawada Central Assembly constituency =

Constituency of the Andhra Pradesh Legislative Assembly, India

Coordinates: 16.496°N 80.665°E

Vijayawada Central
- Constituency No. 80 for the Andhra Pradesh Legislative Assembly
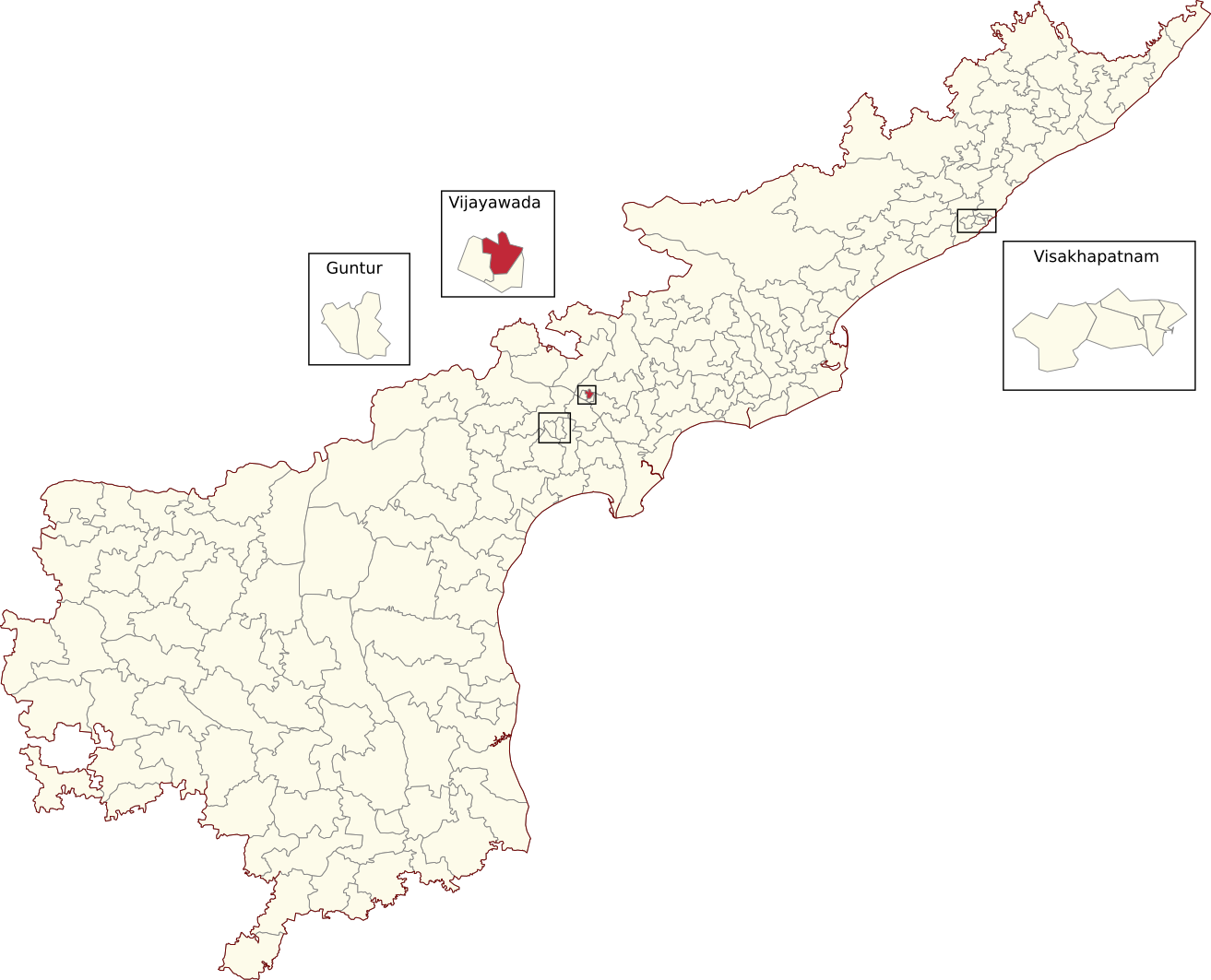
- Location of Vijayawada Central Assembly constituency within Andhra Pradesh

Constituency details
- Country: India
- Region: South India
- State: Andhra Pradesh
- District: NTR
- Lok Sabha constituency: Vijayawada
- Established: 2008
- Total electors: 2,77,724
- Reservation: None

Member of Legislative Assembly
- 16th Andhra Pradesh Legislative Assembly
- Incumbent Bonda Uma
- Party: TDP
- Alliance: NDA
- Elected year: 2024

Vijayawada Central Assembly constituency is a constituency in NTR district of Andhra Pradesh that elects representatives to the Andhra Pradesh Legislative Assembly in India. It is one of the seven assembly segments of Vijayawada Lok Sabha constituency.

Bonda Umamaheswara Rao is the current MLA of the constituency, having won the 2024 Andhra Pradesh Legislative Assembly election from Telugu Desam Party. As of 2019, there are a total of 269,859 electors in the constituency. The constituency was established in 2008, as per the Delimitation Orders (2008).

== Mandals ==
The mandal and wards that form the assembly constituency are:

Mandal
Vijayawada Urban mandal (Part)
Vijayawada Municipal Corporation (Ward No. 14, 20 to 31, 33 to 35, 42 to 44, 49, 77 and 78)

== Members of the Legislative Assembly ==
Year	Member	Political party
2009	Malladi Vishnu	Indian National Congress
2014	Bonda Umamaheswara Rao	Telugu Desam Party
2019	Malladi Vishnu	YSR Congress Party
2024	Bonda Umamaheswara Rao	Telugu Desam Party

== Election results ==
=== 2024 ===
2024 Andhra Pradesh Legislative Assembly election: Vijayawada Central
Party	Candidate	Votes	%	±%
TDP	Bonda Umamaheswara Rao	130,034	63.52	
YSRCP	Vellampalli Srinivasa Rao	61,148	29.87	
CPI(M)	Chigurupati Babu Rao	4,887	2.39	
NOTA	None of the above	951	0.46	
Majority		68,886	33.65	
Turnout		2,04,717		
TDP gain from YSRCP		Swing		

=== 2019 ===
2019 Andhra Pradesh Legislative Assembly election: Vijayawada Central
Party	Candidate	Votes	%	±%
YSRCP	Malladi Vishnu	70,721	39.73	+7.17
TDP	Bonda Umamaheswara Rao	70,696	39.71	−8.79
CPI	Chigurupati Babu Rao	29,333	16.48	
BJP	Sree Satya murthy vamaraju	2567	1.44	
NOTA	None of the above	1016	0.57	N/A
Majority		25	0.02	
Turnout		1,78,013	65.95	
Registered electors		269,912		
YSRCP gain from TDP		Swing		

=== 2014 ===
2014 Andhra Pradesh Legislative Assembly election: Vijayawada Central
Party	Candidate	Votes	%	±%
TDP	Bonda Umamaheswara Rao	82,669	48.50	
YSRCP	P. Gowtham Reddy	55,508	32.56	
Majority		27,161	15.93	
Turnout		170,463	65.81	
Registered electors		259,001		
TDP gain from INC		Swing		

=== 2009 ===
2009 Andhra Pradesh Legislative Assembly election: Vijayawada Central
Party	Candidate	Votes	%	±%
INC	Malladi Vishnu	52,426	33.14%	
PRP	Vangaveeti Radha Krishna	51,578	32.60%	
CPI(M)	Babu Rao Chigurupati	38,273	24.19%	
Margin of victory		848	0.54%	
Turnout		158,267	70.71%	
Registered electors		223,822		
INC win (new seat)				

== See also ==
- List of constituencies of the Andhra Pradesh Legislative Assembly
- Vijayawada East Assembly constituency
- Vijayawada West Assembly constituency
