= Vijayawada West Assembly constituency =

Constituency of the Andhra Pradesh Legislative Assembly, India

Coordinates: 16.538°N 80.613°E

Vijayawada West
- Constituency No. 79 for the Andhra Pradesh Legislative Assembly
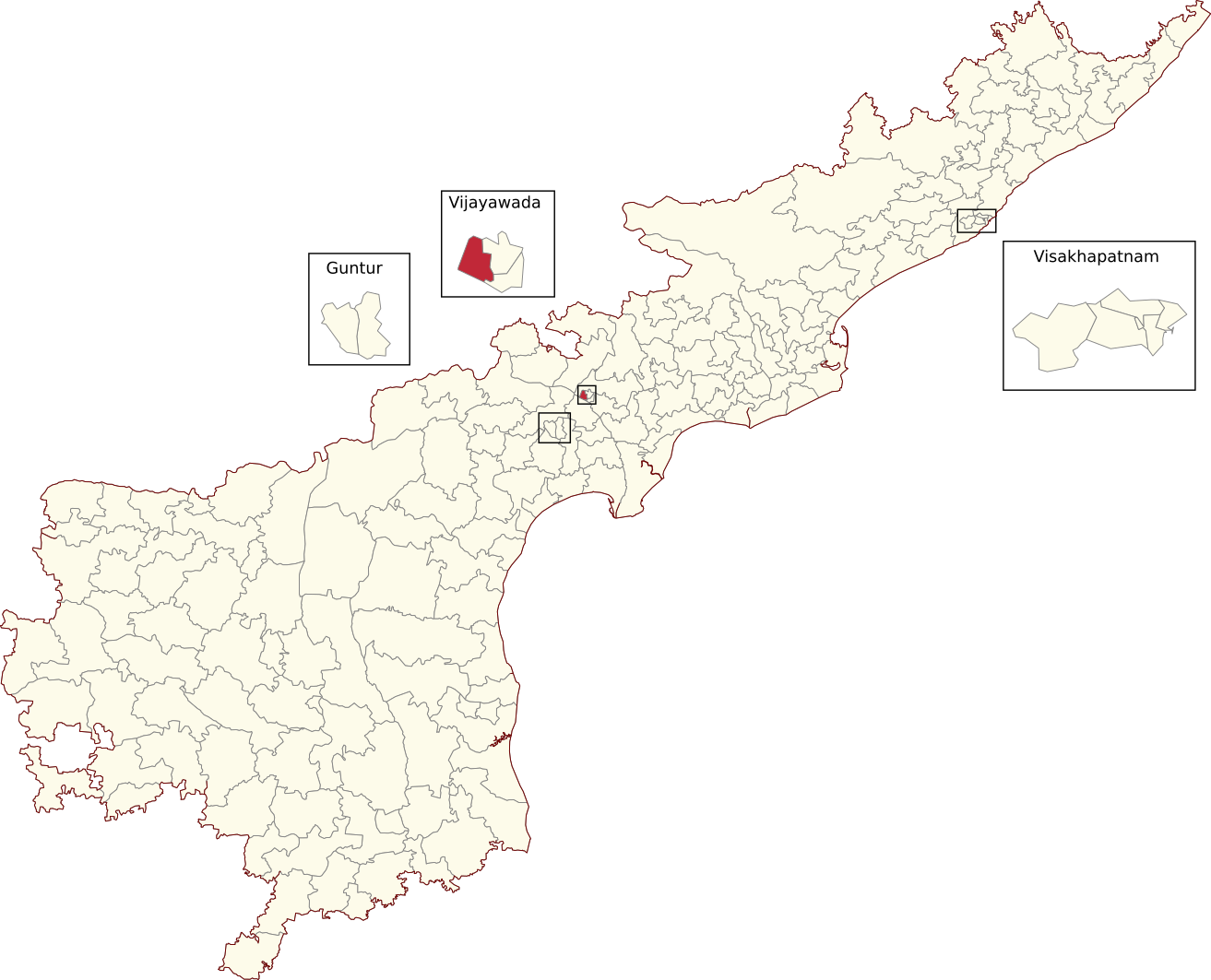
- Location of Vijayawada West Assembly constituency within Andhra Pradesh

Constituency details
- Country: India
- Region: South India
- State: Andhra Pradesh
- District: NTR
- Lok Sabha constituency: Vijayawada
- Established: 1967
- Total electors: 232,555
- Reservation: None

Member of Legislative Assembly
- 16th Andhra Pradesh Legislative Assembly
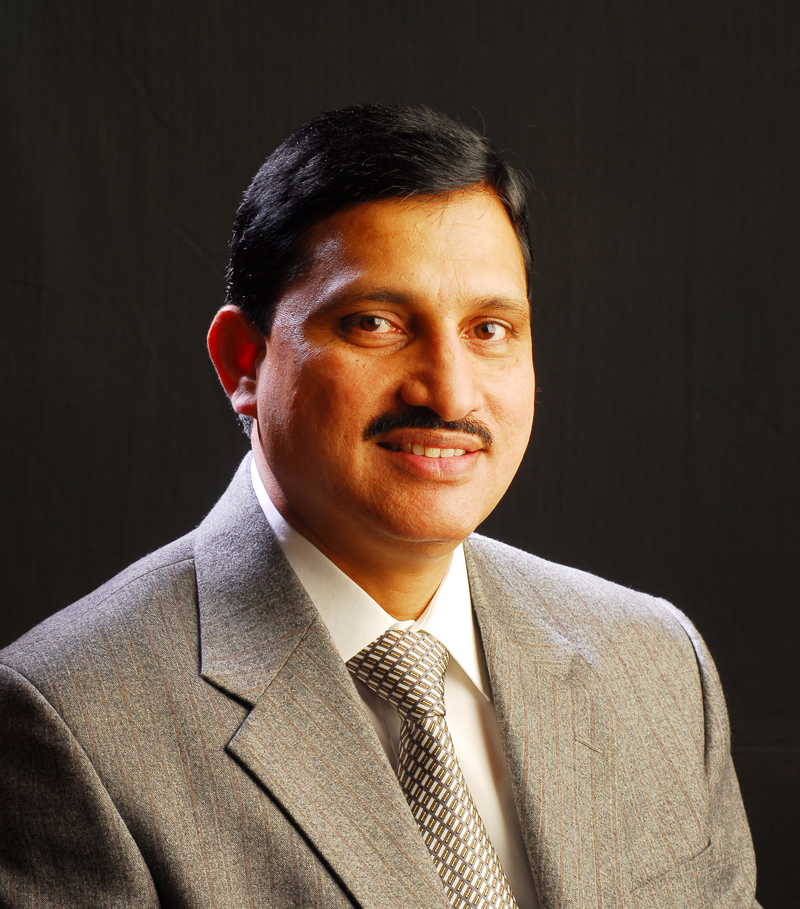
- Incumbent Sujana Chowdary
- Party: BJP
- Alliance: NDA
- Elected year: 2024

Vijayawada West Assembly constituency is a constituency in NTR district of Andhra Pradesh that elects representatives to the Andhra Pradesh Legislative Assembly in India. It is one of the seven assembly segments of Vijayawada Lok Sabha constituency.

Sujana Chowdary is the current MLA of the constituency, having won the 2024 Andhra Pradesh Legislative Assembly election from Bharatiya Janata Party. As of 2019, there are a total of 232,555 electors in the constituency. The constituency was established in 1967, as per the Delimitation Orders (1967).

== Mandals ==
The mandal and wards that form the assembly constituency are:

Mandal
Vijayawada Urban mandal (Part)
Vijayawada Municipal Corporation (Ward No. 34, 35, 37 to 56)

== Members of the Legislative Assembly ==
| Year | Member | Political party |
|---|---|---|
| 1967 | Marupilla Chitti | Indian National Congress |
| 1972 | Asib Pasha | Indian National Congress |
| 1978 | Pothina Chinna | Indian National Congress |
| 1983 | B. S. Jayaraju | Telugu Desam Party |
| 1985 | Uppalapati Ramachandra Raju | Communist Party of India |
| 1989 | M. K. Baig | Indian National Congress |
| 1994 | Kakarlapudi Subba Raju | Communist Party of India |
| 1999 | Jaleel Khan | Indian National Congress |
| 2004 | Shaik Nasar Vali | Communist Party of India |
| 2009 | Vellampalli Srinivas | Praja Rajyam Party |
| 2014 | Jaleel Khan | YSR Congress Party |
| 2019 | Vellampalli Srinivas | YSR Congress Party |
| 2024 | Sujana Chowdary | Bharatiya Janata Party |

== Election results ==
=== 2009 ===
2009 Andhra Pradesh Legislative Assembly election: Vijayawada West
| Party | Candidate | Votes | % | ±% |
|---|---|---|---|---|
| PRP | Vellampalli Srinivas | 51,467 | 34.16 | |
| INC | Mallika Begum | 43,125 | 28.63 | |
| Majority | | 8,342 | | |
| Turnout | | 154,459 | 65.21 | |
| PRP gain from INC | | Swing | | |

=== 2014 ===
2014 Andhra Pradesh Legislative Assembly election: Vijayawada West
| Party | Candidate | Votes | % | ±% |
|---|---|---|---|---|
| YSRCP | Jaleel Khan | 63,180 | 40.89 | |
| BJP | Vellampalli Srinivas | 60,072 | 38.88 | |
| Majority | | 3,108 | 2.01 | |
| Turnout | | 154,459 | 65.21 | |
| YSRCP gain from PRP | | Swing | | |

=== 2019 ===
2019 Andhra Pradesh Legislative Assembly election: Vijayawada West
| Party | Candidate | Votes | % | ±% |
|---|---|---|---|---|
| YSRCP | Vellampalli Srinivas | 58,435 | 38.04 | |
| TDP | Shabana Musarat Khatoon | 50,764 | 33.04 | |
| JSP | Pothina Venkata Mahesh | 22,367 | 14.56 | |
| Majority | | 7,671 | 5.00 | |
| Turnout | | 153,623 | 63.41 | |
| YSRCP hold | | Swing | | |

=== 2024 ===
2024 Andhra Pradesh Legislative Assembly election: Vijayawada West
| Party | Candidate | Votes | % | ±% |
|---|---|---|---|---|
| BJP | Sujana Chowdary | 105,669 | 61.49 | |
| YSRCP | Shaik Asif | 58,637 | 34.12 | |
| CPI | Koteswara Rao Gummadidala | 3,723 | 2.17 | |
| NOTA | None of the above | 1,236 | 0.72 | |
| Majority | | 47,032 | 27.37 | |
| Turnout | | 1,71,843 | | |
| BJP gain from YSRCP | | Swing | | |

== See also ==
- List of constituencies of the Andhra Pradesh Legislative Assembly
- Vijayawada East Assembly constituency
- Vijayawada Central Assembly constituency
