= Vijayawada East Assembly constituency =

Constituency of the Andhra Pradesh Legislative Assembly, India

Coordinates: 16.539°N 80.664°E

Vijayawada East
- Constituency No. 81 for the Andhra Pradesh Legislative Assembly
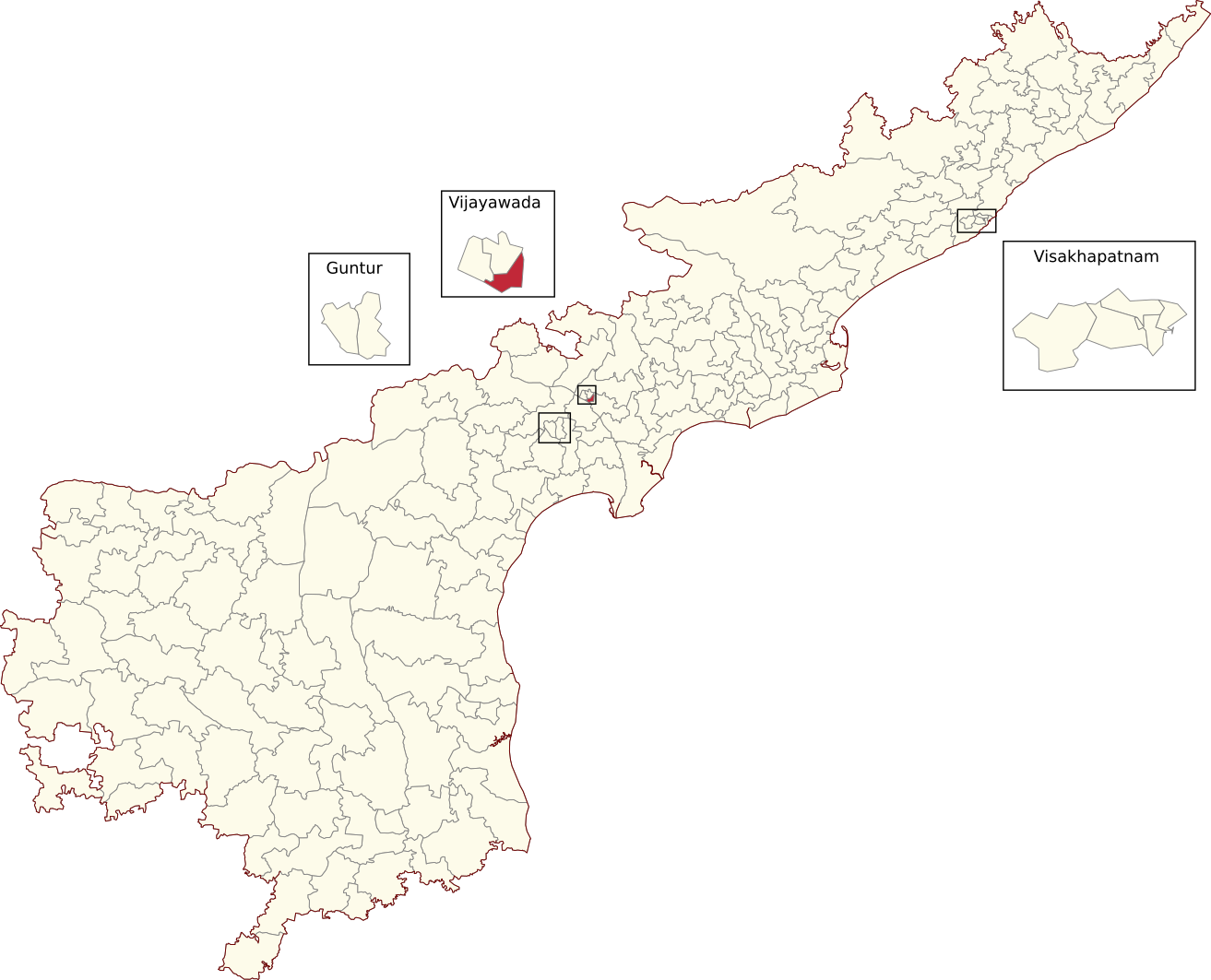
- Location of Vijayawada East Assembly constituency within Andhra Pradesh

Constituency details
- Country: India
- Region: South India
- State: Andhra Pradesh
- District: NTR
- Lok Sabha constituency: Vijayawada
- Established: 1967
- Total electors: 2,70,311
- Reservation: None

Member of Legislative Assembly
- 16th Andhra Pradesh Legislative Assembly
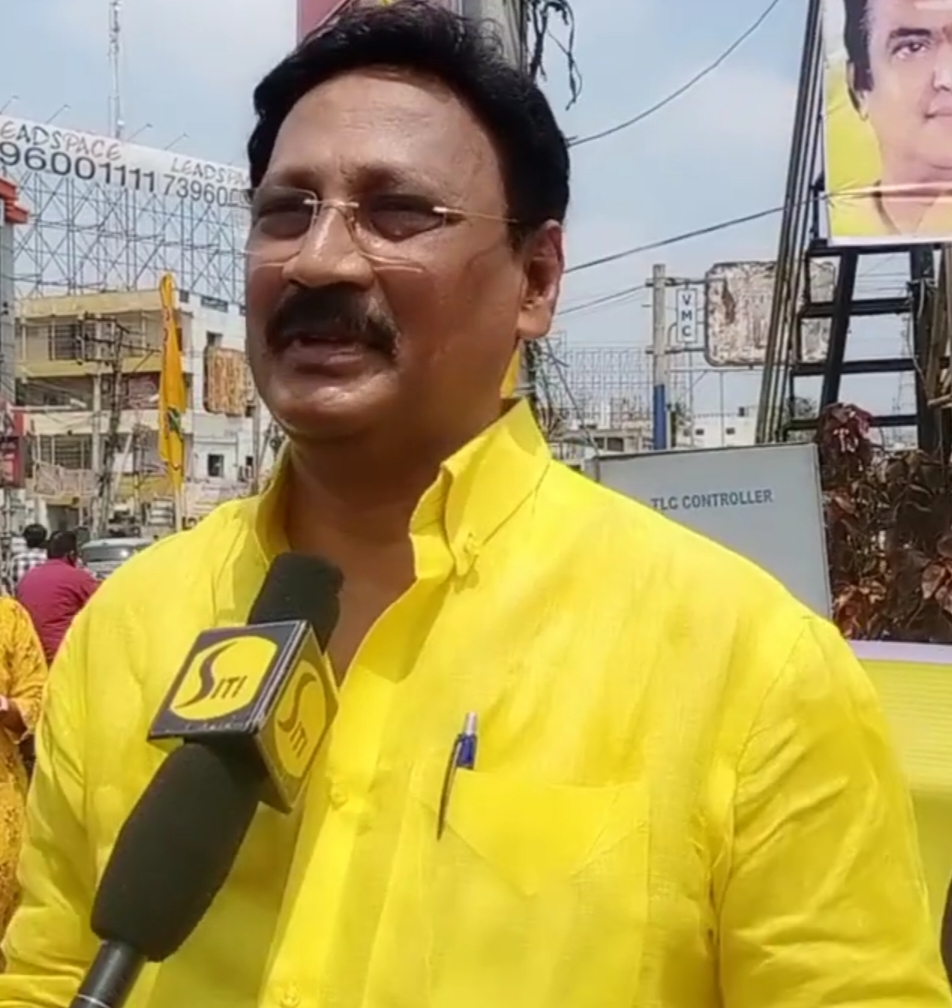
- Incumbent Gadde Rama Mohan
- Party: TDP
- Alliance: NDA
- Elected year: 2024

Vijayawada East Assembly constituency is a constituency in NTR district of Andhra Pradesh that elects representatives to the Andhra Pradesh Legislative Assembly in India. It is one of the seven assembly segments of Vijayawada Lok Sabha constituency.

Most successful political parties
1. INC (7 terms) (53.8%)
2. TDP (4 terms) (30.8%)
3. PRP (1 term) (7.70%)
4. BJP (1 term) (7.70%)

Gadde Rama Mohan is the current MLA of the constituency, having won the 2019 Andhra Pradesh Legislative Assembly election from Telugu Desam Party. As of 2019, there are a total of 2,70,311 electors in the constituency. The constituency was established in 1967, as per the Delimitation Orders (1967).

== Mandals ==
The mandal and wards that form the assembly constituency are:

Mandal
Vijayawada Urban mandal (Part)
Vijayawada Municipal Corporation (Ward No. 32, 36 to 41, 45 to 48 and 50 to 74).

== Members of the Legislative Assembly ==
| Year | Member | Political party |
|---|---|---|
| 1967 | V. S. C. R. Tenneti | Indian National Congress |
| 1972 | Dammaalapaati Rama Rao | Indian National Congress |
| 1978 | N. Bhaskara Rao | Indian National Congress |
| 1983 | Adusumilli Jaiprakasha Rao | Telugu Desam Party |
| 1985 | Vangaveeti Mohana Ranga | Indian National Congress |
| 1989 | Vangaveeti Ratna Kumari | Indian National Congress |
| 1994 | Vangaveeti Ratna Kumari | Indian National Congress |
| 1999 | Kota Srinivasa Rao | Bharatiya Janata Party |
| 2004 | Vangaveeti Radha Krishna | Indian National Congress |
| 2009 | Yalamanchili Ravi | Praja Rajyam Party |
| 2014 | Gadde Rama Mohan | Telugu Desam Party |
| 2019 | Gadde Rama Mohan | Telugu Desam Party |
| 2024 | Gadde Rama Mohan | Telugu Desam Party |

== Election results ==
=== 2009 ===
2009 Andhra Pradesh Legislative Assembly election: Vijayawada East
| Party | Candidate | Votes | % | ±% |
|---|---|---|---|---|
| PRP | Yelamanchili Ravi | 53,319 | 30.97 | |
| INC | Devineni Rajasekhar | 53,129 | 30.86 | |
| TDP | Gadde Rama Mohan | 52,274 | 30.36 | |
| Majority | | 190 | 0.11 | |
| Turnout | | 172,187 | 68.65 | +22.29 |
| PRP gain from INC | | Swing | | |

=== 2014 ===
2014 Andhra Pradesh Legislative Assembly election: Vijayawada East
| Party | Candidate | Votes | % | ±% |
|---|---|---|---|---|
| TDP | Gadde Rama Mohan | 88,784 | 47.95 | |
| YSRCP | Vangaveeti Radhakrishna | 73,281 | 39.58 | |
| Majority | | 15,503 | 8.375 | |
| Turnout | | 185,159 | 65.81 | |
| TDP gain from PRP | | Swing | | |

=== 2019 ===
2019 Andhra Pradesh Legislative Assembly election: Vijayawada East
| Party | Candidate | Votes | % | ±% |
|---|---|---|---|---|
| TDP | Gadde Rama Mohan | 82,990 | 44.4 | |
| YSRCP | Boppana Bhava Kumar | 67,826 | 36.29 | |
| JSP | Battina Ramu | 30,137 | 16.12 | |
| Majority | | 15,164 | ▲8.11 | |
| Turnout | | 1,86,923 | | |
| TDP hold | | Swing | | |

=== 2024 ===
2024 Andhra Pradesh Legislative Assembly election: Vijayawada East
| Party | Candidate | Votes | % | ±% |
|---|---|---|---|---|
| TDP | Gadde Rama Mohan | 118,841 | 60.66 | |
| YSRCP | Devineni Avinash | 69,201 | 35.32 | |
| NOTA | None of the above | 1,049 | 0.54 | |
| Majority | | 49,640 | 25.34 | |
| Turnout | | 1,95,906 | | |
| TDP hold | | Swing | | |

== See also ==
- List of constituencies of the Andhra Pradesh Legislative Assembly
- Vijayawada West Assembly constituency
- Vijayawada Central Assembly constituency
