= P. Upendra =

Indian politician

Parvathaneni Upendra

Member of Parliament, Lok Sabha
- In office 10 May 1996 – 26 April 1999
- Preceded by: Vadde Sobhanadreeswara Rao
- Succeeded by: Gadde Ramamohan
- Constituency: Vijayawada

Union Minister of Information and Broadcasting
- In office 2 December 1989 – 10 November 1990
- Prime Minister: V. P. Singh
- Preceded by: H. K. L. Bhagat
- Succeeded by: Chandra Shekhar

Union Minister of Parliamentary Affairs
- In office 2 December 1989 – 10 November 1990
- Prime Minister: V. P. Singh
- Preceded by: H. K. L. Bhagat
- Succeeded by: Satya Prakash Malaviya

Member of Parliament, Rajya Sabha
- In office 10 April 1984 – 9 April 1996
- Preceded by: Buddha Madhu Maurya
- Succeeded by: Daggubati Venkateswara Rao
- Constituency: Andhra Pradesh

Personal details
- Born: 14 July 1936 Pothunuru, presently in Eluru district
- Died: 16 November 2009 (aged 73) Hyderabad, India
- Party: Praja Rajyam Party (2008–2009)
- Other political affiliations: Indian National Congress (1994–2008); Telugu Desam Party (1982–1994)
- Spouse: Parvathaneni Vasundhra Devi (m. 1956)
- Children: 4

Parvathaneni Upendra (14 July 1936 – 16 November 2009) was an Indian politician from Andhra Pradesh who represented Telugu Desam Party. He served as the Union Cabinet Minister between 1989 and 1990 in V. P. Singh Cabinet. He was the Rajya Sabha Member from Andhra Pradesh 2 times between 1984 and 1996. He was elected successfully from Vijayawada Parliament two times in 1996 and 1998 elections.

== Career ==
P. Upendra holds M. A. degree in English Literature, Post Graduate Diploma in Public Relations and Journalism from Andhra University, University College, Madras and Indian Institute Public Administration, New Delhi. He started as a journalist after graduation.

P. Upendra worked over two decades for Indian Railways as a Public Relations Officer before entering politics. He served as Personal Secretary to then Railways Minister Madhu Dandavate between 1977 and 1979.

In 1982, he joined the Telugu Desam Party (TDP) led by the film actor-turned-politician N. T. Rama Rao. He was first elected to the Rajya Sabha in 1984 and continued as its member till 1996. He was designated as the Leader of the Opposition in the Lok Sabha during the prime ministership of Rajiv Gandhi (1984–1989).

An articulate politician, Upendra enjoyed cordial relations with many senior political leaders, cutting across party lines, at the national level. This had helped him become convenor of the National Front in 1988.

Upendra was the general secretary of the National Front and was minister for information and broadcasting and Parliamentary Affairs in V. P. Singh's cabinet. He oversaw the various parliamentary procedures that were essential to the first coalition government in India. He was also responsible for enacting the Prasar Bharati Act 1990. Together with George Fernandes he attempted to negotiate with RSS chief Madhukar Deoras on the Rath Yatra of L. K. Advani, but this was unsuccessful.

He was expelled from the TDP in March 1992 following differences with N. Chandrababu Naidu. After exit, Upendra spent a couple of years as an "unattached" member in the Rajya Sabha before formally joining Congress in 1994. He was elected to the Lok Sabha from Vijayawada in 1996 and re-elected in 1998.

P. Upendra, was more or less idle since 1999. He consistently maintained a stance opposing the Bharatiya Janata Party and parties like the TDP under Chandrababu Naidu that had allied with it. He quit ruling Congress party in November 2008 to join the Praja Rajyam Party (PRP) floated by actor-turned-politician Chiranjeevi. While joining the Praja Rajyam Party (PRP), he had said that the Congress leadership did not use his services either at the national level or in the state.

Mr. Upendra was instrumental in getting the first escalator in South Central Railway at Vijayawada Junction railway station. He also got Doordarshan Kendra for the city and paved the way for the removal of the Satyanarayanapuram railway track.

Upendra wrote a book Gatam Swagatam in two parts listing his political experience.

== Personal life ==
Upendra married Vasundhara in 1956. They had three sons and one daughter. His eldest son P.V K Mohan is the senior most member of National Shipping Board, second son P Sarat Kumar and third son P. Vivekananda are part of Seaways Shipping Limited. His daughter Padmasri is married to former MP Lagadapati Rajagopal.

== Death ==
Upendra died in Hyderabad on 16 November 2009 due to renal failure at the age of 73. He was on dialysis for five years following a kidney ailment.

Chief Minister K. Rosaiah, TDP president N. Chandrababu Naidu, PRP president Chiranjeevi and other leaders mourned his death.
