= Lagadapati Rajagopal =

Indian politician

Member of Parliament, Lok Sabha
- In office 22 May 2004 – 19 February 2014
- Preceded by: Gadde Ramamohan
- Succeeded by: Kesineni Srinivas
- Constituency: Vijayawada

Personal details
- Born: 1964 (age 61–62) Nellore, india
- Party: Indian National Congress
- Spouse: Padma Sri Lagadapati
- Children: 3 sons
- Parent(s): Lagadapati Ramanaidu; Lagadapati Ramalakshmamma
- Education: V R Siddhartha Engineering College; Loyola Public School, Guntur
- Profession: Industrialist

Lagadapati Rajagopal (born 1964) is an industrialist and former politician. He was the 15th Lok Sabha MP from the Vijaywada constituency for Indian National Congress. He resigned from Parliament and quit politics after the Telangana Bill was passed in the Lok Sabha. Rajagopal is the principal shareholder of Lanco Infratech.

== History ==
He is the son of L. Ramalakshmamma and L.V. Rama Naidu, a contractor. He went into the family business after attending V R Siddhartha Engineering College, where he was suspended for 1 year.

He married the daughter of politician Parvathaneni Upendra. He started two companies, one in the pig iron business and one in the power industry.

In 2004, he ran for office in the Vijayawada district, the seat previously held by Father-in-law Upendra, and became a member of Parliament. He has been a prominent anti-Telangana voice. His company's headquarters have been moved to Delhi because the Hyderabad offices were deemed to be targets because of his anti-Telangana positions.

On 13 February 2014, during a discussion of the Telangana Bill, L Rajagopal used pepper spray while on the floor which caused all the members of Parliament to vacate the building. He stated this was in "self-defence...I used the spray when I saw a colleague from a different party being manhandled". He was suspended from Parliament by speaker Meira Kumar, along with 4 other MPs. Sharad Yadav, Janata Dal (United)'s President, called the actions "sedition". Protests against his actions included burning Rajagopal effigy, and a boycott by lawyers in Warangal district.

He tendered his resignation from Parliament in February 2014.

=== Committee positions ===
While in Parliament, he has been on the following Committees:

- Committee on Urban Development
- Committee on Provision of Computers to Member of Lok Sabha, Offices of Political Parties and Officers of Lok Sabha Secretariat
- Committee on External Affairs
- Committee on Public Undertakings
- Committee on Home Affairs
- Consultative Committee for External Affairs
- Committee on Public Undertakings
