= Malladi Vishnu =

Indian politician and legislator

Member of the Legislative Assembly Andhra Pradesh
- In office 2019-2024
- Preceded by: Bonda Umamaheswara Rao
- Succeeded by: Bonda Umamaheswara Rao
- Constituency: Vijayawada Central
- In office 2009–2014
- Preceded by: Constituency Established
- Succeeded by: Bonda Umamaheswara Rao
- Constituency: Vijayawada Central

Personal details
- Born: Vijayawada, India
- Party: YSRCP
- Children: 2 daughters
- Website: http://www.malladivishnu.in

Malladi Vishnu is an Indian politician and was a legislator belonging to YSR Congress Party. He served as vuda chairman for Vijayawada during YSR time. He represented Vijayawada Central assembly constituency.
