= Vangaveeti Radha Krishna =

Mayor of Vijayawada
- Incumbent
- Assumed office 3 November 2026
- Preceded by: Rayana Bhagya Lakshmi

Member of Legislative Assembly, Andhra Pradesh
- In office 2004–2009
- Preceded by: Kota Srinivasa Rao
- Succeeded by: Yalamanchili Ravi
- Constituency: Vijayawada East

Personal details
- Born: 1978 (age 47–48) Vijayawada, Andhra Pradesh, India
- Party: Janasena Party (since 2026)
- Other political affiliations: Telugu Desam Party (2019–2026); YSR Congress Party (2012–2019); Praja Rajyam Party (2008–2011); Indian National Congress (until 2008)
- Spouse: Pushpavalli
- Children: 1 daughter
- Parents: Vangaveeti Mohana Ranga (father); Vangaveeti Ratna Kumari (mother)
- Education: B.Com.
- Occupation: Politician

Vangaveeti Radha Krishna (1978) is an Indian politician from Andhra Pradesh. He represented Vijayawada East Assembly constituency from the Indian National Congress.
