= Adusumilli Jaiprakasha Rao =

Indian politician

Adusumilli Jaiprakasha Rao (died 21 September 2024 ) was an Indian politician from Andhra Pradesh. He was a member of the Andhra Pradesh Legislative Assembly from the Vijayawada East Assembly constituency in Krishna district representing the Telugu Desam Party in 1983.

== Early life ==
Rao was from Mogalrajapuram, Vijayawada, Krishna district, Andhra Pradesh. He had a son Adusumilli Thirumalesh. He entered politics as a student leader with the Indian National Congress party. His political guru was Kakani Venkata Ratnam. He was active in the Samaikhyandhra agitation.

== Career ==
Rao won the Vijayawada East Assembly constituency in the 1983 Andhra Pradesh Legislative Assembly election representing the Telugu Desam Party. He polled 38,411 votes and defeated his nearest rival Jandyala Kameswari Shanker of the Indian National Congress (Indira), by a margin of 14,877 votes.

=== Death ===
Rao died on 21 September 2024 at a private hospital in Hyderabad. He was suffering for sometime due to lung infection. His funeral was held at Vijayawada.
