= Jaggayyapeta Assembly constituency =

Constituency of the Andhra Pradesh Legislative Assembly, India

Coordinates: 16.90°N 80.10°E

Jaggayyapeta
- Constituency No. 84 for the Andhra Pradesh Legislative Assembly
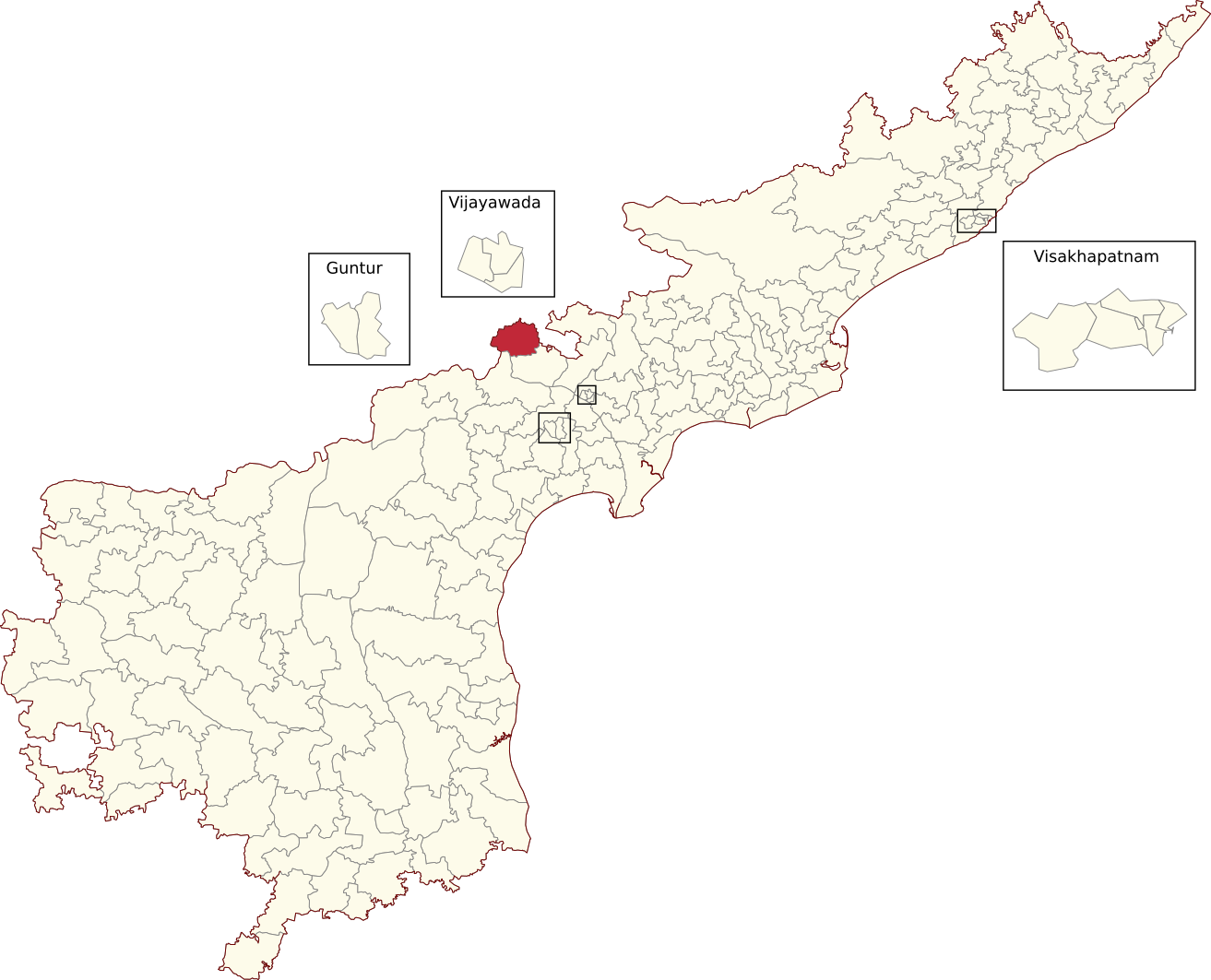
- Location of Jaggayyapeta Assembly constituency within Andhra Pradesh

Constituency details
- Country: India
- Region: South India
- State: Andhra Pradesh
- District: NTR
- Lok Sabha constituency: Vijayawada
- Established: 1951
- Total electors: 195,686
- Reservation: None

Member of Legislative Assembly
- 16th Andhra Pradesh Legislative Assembly
- Incumbent Rajagopal Sreeram
- Party: TDP
- Alliance: NDA
- Elected year: 2024

Jaggayyapeta Assembly constituency is a constituency in NTR district of Andhra Pradesh that elects representatives to the Andhra Pradesh Legislative Assembly in India. It is one of the seven assembly segments of Vijayawada Lok Sabha constituency.

Rajagopal Sreeram is the current MLA of the constituency, having won the 2024 Andhra Pradesh Legislative Assembly election from Telugu Desam Party. As of 2019, there are a total of 195,686 electors in the constituency. The constituency was established in 1951, as per the Delimitation Orders (1951).

== Mandals ==
Mandal
Vatsavai
Jaggayyapeta
Penuganchiprolu
Nandigama (Part) Magallu, Konduru, Ramireddipalle, Jonnalagadda, Konathamatmakuru, Torragudipadu, Damuluru, Somavaram, Rudravaram and Gollamudi Villages.

== Members of the Legislative Assembly ==
Year	Member	Political party
1952	Pillalamarvi Venkateswarlu	Communist Party of India
1962	Galeti Venkateswarlu	Indian National Congress
1967	R. B. R. S. Sresti	Indian National Congress
1972	V R G K M Prasad	Independent
1978	Bodduluru Ramarao	Indian National Congress (I)
1983	Akkineni Lokeswara Rao	Independent
1985	Nettem Raghu Ram	Telugu Desam Party
1989	Nettem Raghu Ram	Telugu Desam Party
1994	Nettem Raghu Ram	Telugu Desam Party
1999	Samineni Udayabhanu	Indian National Congress
2004	Samineni Udayabhanu	Indian National Congress
2009	Rajagopal Sreeram (Tataiah)	Telugu Desam Party
2014	Rajagopal Sreeram (Tataiah)	Telugu Desam Party
2019	Samineni Udayabhanu	YSR Congress Party
2024	Rajagopal Sreeram (Tataiah)	Telugu Desam Party

== Election results ==
=== 2024 ===
2024 Andhra Pradesh Legislative Assembly election: Jaggayyapeta
Party	Candidate	Votes	%	±%
TDP	Rajagopal Sreeram	98,479	52.98	
YSRCP	Samineni Udayabhanu	82,502	44.38	
INC	Apparao Karnati	2,527	1.36	
NOTA	None of the above	773	0.42	
Majority		15,977	8.6	
Turnout		1,85,887		
TDP gain from YSRCP		Swing		

=== 2019 ===
2019 Andhra Pradesh Legislative Assembly election: Jaggayyapeta
Party	Candidate	Votes	%	±%
YSRCP	Samineni Udayabhanu	87,965	49.95	
TDP	Rajagopal Sreeram	83,187	47.23	
Majority		4,778	2.72	
Turnout		176.115	89.74	+6.27
YSRCP gain from TDP		Swing		

=== 2014 ===
2014 Andhra Pradesh Legislative Assembly election: Jaggayyapeta
Party	Candidate	Votes	%	±%
TDP	Rajagopal Sreeram	80,939	48.84	
YSRCP	Samineni Udayabhanu	79,093	47.73	
Majority		1,846	1.11	
Turnout		165,720	89.61	+1.42
TDP hold		Swing		

=== 2009 ===
2009 Andhra Pradesh Legislative Assembly election: Jaggayyapeta
Party	Candidate	Votes	%	±%
TDP	Rajagopal Sreeram	75,107	50.67	+6.13
INC	Samineni Udayabhanu	65,429	44.14	−9.32
Majority		9,678	6.53	
Turnout		148,234	88.19	+7.59
TDP gain from INC		Swing		

=== 2004 ===
2004 Andhra Pradesh Legislative Assembly election: Jaggayyapeta
Party	Candidate	Votes	%	±%
INC	Samineni Udayabhanu	70,057	53.46	+2.30
TDP	Sri Raghu Ram Nettam	58,363	44.54	−0.26
Majority		11,694	8.92	
Turnout		131,045	80.60	−5.81
INC hold		Swing		

=== 1952 ===
1952 Madras State Legislative Assembly election: Jaggayyapeta
Party	Candidate	Votes	%	±%
CPI	Pillalamarvi Venkateswarlu	29,773	60.10%	
INC	Bandi Tirupathayya	8,550	17.26%	17.26%
KLP	Adusumalli Suryanarayana Rao	5,021	10.13%	
Independent	Chintalapati Venkatasivarama Krishna	4,850	9.79%	
Independent	Pallivalla Chandra Rao	1,349	2.72%	
Margin of victory		21,223	42.84%	
Turnout		49,543	70.06%	
Registered electors		70,714		
CPI win (new seat)				

== See also ==
- List of constituencies of the Andhra Pradesh Legislative Assembly
