= Samineni Udaya Bhanu =

Indian politician

Member of Legislative Assembly, Andhra Pradesh
- In office 2019–2024
- Preceded by: Rajagopal Sreeram
- Succeeded by: Rajagopal Sreeram
- Constituency: Jaggayyapeta
- In office 1999–2009
- Preceded by: Nettem Raghu Ram
- Succeeded by: Rajagopal Sreeram
- Constituency: Jaggayyapeta

Personal details
- Born: August 2, 1955 (age 71) Jaggayyapeta, Krishna district, Andhra Pradesh, India
- Party: Jana Sena Party (since 2024)
- Other political affiliations: Indian National Congress; YSR Congress Party
- Education: B.Com, SGS College, Jaggayyapeta
- Occupation: Politician

Samineni Udaya Bhanu (born 2 August 1955) is an Indian politician from Andhra Pradesh. He was a three-time MLA from Jaggayyapeta Assembly constituency in Krishna district. He represented the Indian National Congress twice and the YSR Congress Party once. But he lost the 2024 Andhra Pradesh Legislative Assembly election.

== Early life and education ==
Udayabhanu was born in Jaggayyapeta, Krishna district, Andhra Pradesh. He is the son the late Samineni Viswanadham. He completed his schooling in Zilla Parishad High School in 1970 before completing his intermediate, the two-year pre-university course. Then, he did his B.Com in 1975., from SGS College which is affiliated with Andhra University.

== Career ==
Udayabhanu made his debut in electoral politics in 1999 representing the Indian National Congress. He won the 1999 Andhra Pradesh Legislative Assembly Election defeating Rajagopal Sreeram of the Telugu Desam Party by a margin of 4,778 votes. He won the Jaggayyapeta seat again in 2004 on a Congress ticket defeating Nettam Sriraghuram of TDP by a margin of 11,694 votes. But he lost the 2009 and 2014 elections to Rajagopal Sreeram of the Telugu Desam Party. However, he shifted to the YSR Congress Party and was reelected from the same constituency in the 2019 Andhra Pradesh Legislative Assembly election defeating Sreeram by a margin of 4,778 votes. But Rajagopal Sreeram once again defeated him in the 2024 Andhra Pradesh Legislative Assembly election. Later in September 2024, he shifted to Jana Sena Party.

In August 2023, he was appointed a member of the TTD trust board. But a Public Interest Litigation was filed in the court challenging his appointment as he was facing charges in Delhi liquor scam case. He also served as the government whip.
