= Jaleel Khan =

Indian politician

Member of Legislative Assembly Andhra Pradesh
- In office 2014–2019
- Preceded by: Vellampalli Srinivas
- Succeeded by: Vellampalli Srinivas
- Constituency: Vijayawada West
- In office 1999–2004
- Preceded by: Kakarla Subba Raju
- Succeeded by: Shaik Nasar Vali
- Constituency: Vijayawada West

Personal details
- Born: Jaleel Khan; 10 December 1954 (age 71) Vijayawada, Andhra Pradesh, India
- Children: 3 daughters, 1 son
- Education: B.Com.
- Occupation: Politician

Jaleel Khan (born 10 December 1954), is an Indian politician from the state of Andhra Pradesh. He was MLA of Vijayawada West constituency.

He was elected as MLA from YSR Congress in 2014 state assembly elections, beating his nearest rival, V. Srinivas, by a narrow margin. Later in the 2016 he joined ruling Telugu Desam Party. He was also elected as MLA through the INC party in 1999.

AP Chief Minister, Mr. Chandrababu Naidu, has nominated Jaleel Khan as AP Waqf Board Chairman.

== Controversies ==
On 23 April 2016, he allegedly directed his henchmen to attack reporter of a daily newspaper for taking pictures when he was having an argument with masjid committee members at a meeting at Tarapet in Vijayawada.

On 27 December 2016, during an interview with an online channel, he said that he studied physics in B. Com. This part of interview went viral and made him popular overnight. And spoofs on this video were trending online for many days and many jokes were made on him and B.com. Physics even until today. Telugu Desam party named him chairman of Waqf board, Andhra Pradesh.
