= Panchumarthi Anuradha =

Indian politician

Member of Legislative Council Andhra Pradesh
- Incumbent
- Assumed office March 2023
- Constituency: Elected by MLAs

7th Mayor of Vijayawada
- In office 2000–2005
- Preceded by: T. Venkateswara Rao
- Succeeded by: Tadi Shankuntala

Personal details
- Born: 21 September 1974 (age 51)
- Party: Telugu Desam Party (2000–present)
- Parent(s): Swargham Pulla Rao and Gruhi
- Occupation: Politician

Panchumarthi Anuradha (born 21 September 1974) is an Indian Politician from Andhra Pradesh. She was elected as a Member of the Legislative Council on behalf of the Telugu Desam Party by MLA quota election. She was a former Mayor of Vijayawada in the state of Andhra Pradesh. She won the MLA quota MLC elections with two cross-votes from YSRCP MLAs and defeated the ruling party’s candidate. She joined TDP in 2000 and contested in Mayor elections of Vijayawada, Andhra Pradesh and won 6800 majority votes.

== Career ==
She was born to Swargam Pulla Rao and Gruhi.

== Political career ==
Panchumarthi Anuradha was the youngest woman when she assumed office as the Mayor of Vijayawada, Andhra Pradesh on 30 March 2000, at the age of 26 years old, which was published in Limca Book of Records

2000- 2005: Mayor of Vijayawada.

2008- 2014: General Secretary of TDP.
