= List of mayors of Vijayawada =

Mayor of Vijayawada
- Incumbent; Vacant since 18 March 2026
- Reports to: Chief Minister of Andhra Pradesh
- Seat: Vijayawada, Andhra Pradesh, India
- Appointer: Councillors of VMC
- Term length: Three years, renewable
- Constituting instrument: Municipal Corporation Act
- Website: https://vmc.ap.gov.in/welcome

The Mayor of Vijayawada heads Vijayawada Municipal Corporation which governs Indian city of Vijayawada. Mayor of Vijayawada is the first citizen of the city. Municipal Corporation mechanism in India was introduced during British Rule with formation of Madras (Chennai) in 1688, later followed by municipal corporations in Bombay (Mumbai) and Calcutta (Kolkata) by 1762. However the process of introduction for an elected president in the municipalities was made in Lord Mayo's Resolution of 1870. Since then the current form and structure of municipal bodies followed is similar to Lord Ripon's Resolution adopted in 1882 on local self-governance. The 74th Constitutional Amendment Act of 1992 was introduced to recognise Urban Local Bodies (ULBs) which included Municipal Corporations, Nagar Panchayats, Municipal Councils.

== Elections and tenure ==
Mayor of Vijayawada is elected by elected members of various wards of Municipal Corporation Vijayawada. The political partie's winning members in city's municipal council elections nominates one among each of them to contest for the post of Mayor of the Corporation. Rayana Bhagya Lakshmi was elected as the 12th Mayor at the first council meeting held after declaration of municipal elections results for Vijayawada Municipal Corporation. She is the fifth woman mayor of the corporation.

Vijayawada Municipal Corporation has 64 wards and each ward is represented by a corporator. Rayana Bhagya Lakshmi representing Yuvajana Sramika Rythu Congress Party (YSRCP), ruling political party of Andhra Pradesh won 49 corporators, opposition Telugu Desam Party won 14 Corporators and one each going to others.

== Roles and Responsibilities ==
Role of the mayor.

- Governs the local civic body.
- Fixed tenure varying in different towns.
- First citizen of city.
- Has two varied roles — Representation and upholding of the dignity of the city during ceremonial times and a presiding over discussions of the civic house with elected representatives in functional capacity.
- The Mayor's role is confined to the corporation hall of presiding authority at various meetings relating to corporation.
- The Mayor's role extends much beyond the local city and country as the presiding authority at corporation meetings during visits of a foreign dignitary to the city as he is invited by the state government to receive and represent the citizens to the guest of honour.
- At government, civic and other social functions he is given prominence.

== List of Mayors ==
Sno.	Name	Tenure			Political Party	Election	Ref.
Sno.	Name	Took office	Left office	Duration	Political Party	Election	Ref.
Vijayawada Municipal Corporation
1	T. Venkateswara Rao	1981	1983	2 years	Communist Party of India	1	
2	Ayta Ramulu	1983	1984	1 year	Communist Party of India	1	
3	Lanka Govindarajulu	1984	1985	1 year	Communist Party of India	1	
4	Ayta Ramulu	1985	1986	1 year	Communist Party of India	1	
5	Jandhyala Shankar	1987	1992	5 years	Indian National Congress	2	
6	T. Venkateswara Rao	1995	2000	5 years	Communist Party of India	3	
7	Panchumarthi Anuradha	2000	7 October 2005	5 years	Telugu Desam Party	4	
8	Tadi Shankuntala	7 October 2005	1 November 2006	1 year, 25 days	Indian National Congress	5	
9	Mallika Begum	1 November 2006	17 December 2008	2 years, 46 days	Indian National Congress	5	
10	M. V. Ratnabindu	17 December 2008	2010	2 years	Indian National Congress	5	
11	Koneru Sreedhar	3 July 2014	2 July 2019	4 years, 364 days	Telugu Desam Party	6	
12	Rayana Bhagya Lakshmi	18 March 2021	18 March 2026	5 years, 0 days	YSR Congress Party	7	
13	Vangaveeti Radha Krishna	3 November 2026	Incumbent	19 days	Janasena Party	8	

=== List of Deputy Mayors ===
Name	Term start	Term end	Party	Ref.
A.Prasanna	2002	2005	Telugu Desam Party	
K.B.Durga Prasad	2005	2007	Indian National Congress	
S.Narsaraju	2007	2010	Indian National Congress	
Gogula Venkata Rama Rao	3 July 2014	18 March 2021	Telugu Desam Party	
Bellam Durga	18 March 2021	18 March 2026	YSR Congress Party	
A. Sailaja Reddy	5 August 2021	18 March 2026	YSR Congress Party	

== See also ==
- Lists of Indian mayors
