= Gadde Rama Mohan =

Indian politician

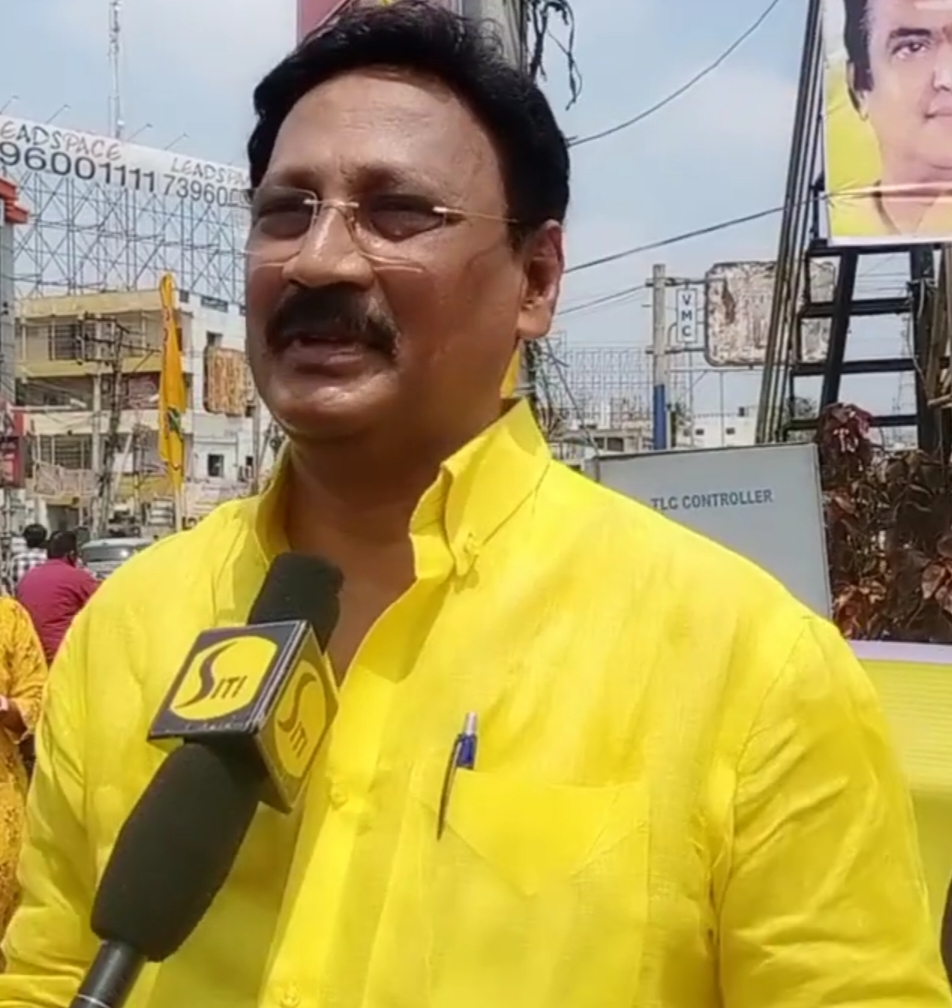
- Rama Mohan in 2020

Member of Parliament, Lok Sabha
- In office 1999–2004
- Preceded by: P. Upendra
- Succeeded by: Lagadapati Rajagopal
- Constituency: Vijayawada

Member of Andhra Pradesh Legislative Assembly
- Incumbent
- Assumed office 2014
- Preceded by: Y. Ravi
- Constituency: Vijayawada East
- In office 1994–1999
- Succeeded by: D. V. Balavaradhan Rao
- Constituency: Gannavaram
- Preceded by: M. Rathna Bose

Personal details
- Party: Telugu Desam Party
- Spouse: Gadde Anuradha
- Children: 2

Gadde Rama Mohan Rao is an Indian politician who was a member of the 13th Lok Sabha of India from Vijayawada constituency of Andhra Pradesh as a member of the Telugu Desam Party. He was also a Member of the Legislative Assembly of Andhra Pradesh, representing Gannavaram constituency during 1994–1999. He was the Vijayawada Urban division convenor for TDP from 2004 to 2009. He serves as the head of TDP in Vijayawada East constituency. He won from Vijayawada (East) assembly constituency in 2014, 2019, 2024 Andhra Pradesh elections.

His wife, Gadde Anuradha, is also a politician from TDP party and had served as Krishna ZP Chairperson.
