= Vangaveeti Mohana Ranga =

Indian politician (1947–1988)

Vangaveeti Mohana Ranga Rao

Member of Legislative Assembly, Andhra Pradesh
- In office 1985–1988
- Preceded by: Adusumilli Jaiprakash Rao
- Succeeded by: Vangaveeti Ratna Kumari
- Constituency: Vijayawada East

Personal details
- Born: Vangaveeti Mohana Ranga Rao; 4 July 1947 Katuru, Vuyyuru, Krishna district
- Died: 26 December 1988 (aged 41) Vijayawada, Andhra Pradesh
- Cause of death: Murder
- Party: Indian National Congress
- Spouse: Vangaveeti Ratna Kumari
- Children: 2 including Vangaveeti Radha Krishna
- Occupation: Politician

Vangaveeti Mohana Ranga Rao (4 July 1947 – 26 December 1988) was an Indian politician from Andhra Pradesh. He represented Vijayawada East assembly constituency as a member of Indian National Congress.

Ranga's elder brother, Vangaveeti Radha Krishna Rao Sr., was associated with Chalasani Venkata Rathnam, secretary of the Communist Party of India, Vijayawada. Conflict arose between Venkata Rathnam and Vangaveeti Radha, over controlling the Vijayawada transport business, dominated by Datti Kanaka Rao, a follower of Chalasani Venkata Rathnam. In 1972, both Kanaka Rao, and Venkata Rathnam were allegedly murdered by Vangaveeti Radha's supporters. These events in turn led to a retaliation by a rival group, ending in the murder of Vangaveeti Radha. Upon the death of Vangaveeti Radha, his brother Mohana Ranga took over the leadership of United Independent Organization with the support of student union leaders Devineni Chandrasekhar (Gandhi), and Devineni Rajasekhar (Nehru).

The power struggle between the politically powerful Mohana Ranga and the Devineni family led to the splitting of the United Independent Organization and to the alleged murders of brothers Devineni Chandrasekhar (Gandhi) in 1979 and Devineni Murali in 1988. Subsequently, while Ranga was staging an indefinite fast for distribution of land pattas to residents of Giripuram, he was assassinated in the early hours of 26 December 1988 by a group of men allegedly belonging to Devineni Rajasekhar (Nehru) at Mohana Ranga's camp. Ranga's two assigned bodyguards did not intervene. The murder led to large-scale riots in erstwhile Krishna, Guntur and the Godavari districts.

== Personal life ==
Mohana Ranga was born in Katuru near Vuyyuru, located in the Krishna district of Andhra Pradesh on 4 July 1947. His parents are Vangaveeti Seetharamaya, and Vangaveeti Savithramma. He had four elder brothers — Vangaveeti Koteswara Rao (died at early age), Vangaveeti Venkata Narayana Rao (APSRTC employee), Vangaveeti Sobhana Chalapathi Rao (ex-MLA Vuyyuru in 1989) and Vangaveeti Radha Krishna Rao Sr., popularly known as Robinhood Radha, who was murdered in 1974. Mohana Ranga was married to Chennupati Ratna Kumari; they had a son Radha Krishna, named after Ranga's brother Vangaveeti Radha Krishna Sr., and a daughter, Vangaveeti Asha Kiran.

== Political career ==
Vangaveeti Ranga entered public life after the death of his elder brother Vangaveeti Radha Krishna Sr. His political career began in 1981, when he ran in the municipal election and the Congress Party withdrew its candidate in his favor. His rival in the district, Devineni Rajasekhar, (Nehru), was sponsored by the Telugu Desam Party (TDP). Ranga became an MLA for the Congress Party in 1985; Rajasekhar became a TDP MLA, and eventually a minister. Starting in 1983 both parties were implicated in gang warfare; N. T. Rama Rao was at the time the Chief Minister of Andhra Pradesh.

The gang warfare in Vijayawada dated further back; Ranga had served time in prison for the murder of Rajasekhar's brother Gandhi. On 10 March 1988, Rajasekhar's one more brother Murali was killed, and followers of Ranga were accused. Ranga also campaigned against police abuse. On 10 July 1988, a rally called Kapunadu proclaimed him leader of the Kapus; he was in prison at the time, but after his release later that month began a bus tour called Jana Chaitanya Yatra "to expose the autocratic rule and misdeeds of Rama Rao". Rao had come to power after a van tour.

== Riots ==
Following his death, there were riots throughout the region. The pattern of violence showed that the houses and property of Telugu Desam sympathisers who were mostly Kammas were attacked. The city of Vijayawada was under curfew for 40 days. 42 people were killed. Devineni Rajasekhar (Nehru) was ordered by the Chief Minister to surrender himself, and the Director-General of Police resigned. 44 people were accused of the crime; in 2002, the 33 who had not died in the meantime were all acquitted. One of them, Chalasani Venkateswara Rao, known as Pandu, was murdered in 2010.

== Successors ==
Mohana Ranga's widow Ratna Kumari was elected MLA in 1989; in her second term, she switched from the Congress Party to the TDP. Radha Krishna Jr also entered politics after his father's death. He was a Congress Party MLA from 2004 to 2009; later he shifted to the Praja Rajyam Party (PRP) then to the YSR Congress Party in 2012, and then to TDP in 2019.

== In popular culture ==
- Chaitanya Ratham, a 1987 film based on the life of Mohana Ranga starring Bhanu Chander and Sarath Babu in lead roles and produced by Radha Mitra Mandali Movies
- Sahasame Naa Oopiri, a 1989 film directed by Vijaya Nirmala and starring Krishna in the lead role was based on the murder of Mohana Ranga
- Vangaveeti, 2016 biographical film on Vangaveeti Mohana Ranga, directed by Ram Gopal Varma
