= 2021 Vijayawada Municipal Corporation election =

Municipal Corporation election in Vijayawada, India

- 10 March 2021

All 64 elected seats in the Vijayawada Municipal Corporation 33 seats needed for a majority

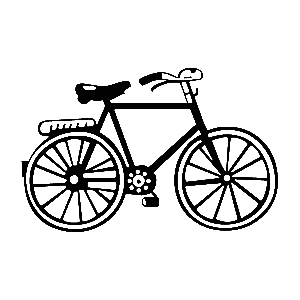

	First party	Second party	Third party
Party	YSRCP	TDP	CPI(M)
Last election	19	38	1
Seats won	49	14	1
Seat change	▲30	▼24	Steady
	Fourth party	Fifth party
Party	JSP	BJP
Last election	new	1
Seats won	0	0
Seat change	Steady	▼1
Mayor before election
Koneru Sreedhar
Telugu Desam Party
Elected Mayor
Rayana Bhagya Lakshmi
YSR Congress Party

The 2021 Vijayawada Municipal Corporation election was held on 10 March 2021 to elect 64 councillors of the Vijayawada Municipal Corporation. The votes were counted and the results were declared on 14 March 2021. The YSR Congress Party emerged victorious and subsequently Rayana Bhagya Lakshmi was elected as the Mayor for the corporation.

== Election schedule ==
Event	Date
Date for Nominations	11 March 2020
Last Date for filing Nominations	13 March 2020
Date for scrutiny of nominations	14 March 2020
Date for commencement of withdrawal of candidature	2 March 2021
Last date for withdrawal of candidatures and publication of contesting candidates	3 March 2021
Date of poll	10 March 2021
Date of re-poll, if any	13 March 2021
Date of counting	14 March 2021

== Results by wards ==
The winners are as follows.https://sec.ap.gov.in/Doc21/Elected_Ward_Members_MunicipalCorporations.pdf

Results
Ward	Winner	
#	Candidate	Party
1	Vuddanti Sunitha	YSR Congress Party
2	Ambadipudi Nirmala Kumari	YSR Congress Party
3	Bhimisetty Pravallika	YSR Congress Party
4	Jasthi Sambasiva Rao	Telugu Desam Party
5	Ambedkar Kalapala	YSR Congress Party
6	Viyyapu Amarnath	YSR Congress Party
7	Merakanpalli Madhuri	YSR Congress Party
8	Usharani Chennupati	Telugu Desam Party
9	Chennupati Kanthisri	Telugu Desam Party
10	Aparna Devineni	Telugu Desam Party
11	Kesineni Swetha	Telugu Desam Party
12	Potluri Siva Sai Prasad	Telugu Desam Party
13	Mummaneni Venkata Prasad	Telugu Desam Party
14	Sambasiva Rao Chintala	YSR Congress Party
15	Bellam Durga	YSR Congress Party
16	Ummadisetti Radhika	YSR Congress Party
17	Thangirala Rami Reddy	YSR Congress Party
18	Venkata Satya Narayana	YSR Congress Party
19	Mohammed Rehana Nahid	YSR Congress Party
20	Adapa Seshagiri	YSR Congress Party
21	Puppala Narasa Kumari	YSR Congress Party
22	Konda Reddy Tatiparthi	YSR Congress Party
23	Nellibandla Balaswamy	Telugu Desam Party
24	Kukkala Anitha	YSR Congress Party
25	Banka Sakuntala Devi	YSR Congress Party
26	Vallabhaneni Rajeswari	Telugu Desam Party
27	Kondayagunta Malleswari	YSR Congress Party
28	Veeramachaneni Lalitha	Telugu Desam Party
29	Kongitala Lakshmipathi	YSR Congress Party
30	Bhimireddy Siva Venkata Janareddy	YSR Congress Party
31	Penumatsa Sirisha	YSR Congress Party
32	Channagiri Rama Mohana Rao	Telugu Desam Party
33	N D S Satyanarayana Murty Valluri	YSR Congress Party
34	Sivasakthi Nagendra Punyaseela Bandi	YSR Congress Party
35	Balasani Manimma	YSR Congress Party
36	Bali Govindu	YSR Congress Party
37	Mandepudi Chatarji	YSR Congress Party
38	Rahamathunnisa Shaik	YSR Congress Party
39	Gudivada Narendra Raghava	YSR Congress Party
40	Anjaneyareddy Yaradla	YSR Congress Party
41	Irfan Mohammed	YSR Congress Party
42	Chaitanya Reddy Padigapati	YSR Congress Party
43	Bapati Koti Reddy	YSR Congress Party
44	Ratna Kumari Mylavarapu	YSR Congress Party
45	Mylavarapu Madhuri Lavanya	Telugu Desam Party
46	Rayana Bhagya Lakshmi	YSR Congress Party
47	Ganga Godavari	YSR Congress Party
48	Attaluri Adi Lakshmi	YSR Congress Party
49	Bulla Vijaya Kumar	YSR Congress Party
50	Boye Satya Babu	Communist Party of India
51	Marupilla Rajesh	YSR Congress Party
52	Ummadi Venkateswara Rao	Telugu Desam Party
53	Appaji Rao Mahadevu	YSR Congress Party
54	Abdul Aqeeb Arshad	YSR Congress Party
55	Seeramsetty Purnachandra Rao	YSR Congress Party
56	Chalapathi Rao Yalakala	YSR Congress Party
57	Esarapu Devi	YSR Congress Party
58	Avuthu Sri Sailaja	YSR Congress Party
59	Mohammed Shaheena Sulthana	YSR Congress Party
60	Kanchi Durga	Telugu Desam Party
61	Ummadi Ramadevi	YSR Congress Party
62	Alampuru Vijayalakshmi	YSR Congress Party
63	Modugula Thirupatamma	YSR Congress Party
64	Thirupatamma Yarragorla	YSR Congress Party
