= S. V. Rajashekhar Babu =

Indian police officer

- Born: India
- Occupation: IPS Officer

S. V. Rajashekhar Babu is an Indian Police Service officer. He currently serves as the Commissioner of Police (CP) of NTR district in Vijayawada. He succeeded P.H.D. Ramakrishna.

== Life and career ==
He is a 2006-batch SPS officer. Before assuming his position as a Commissioner of Police of the NTR District, Vijayawada, he was working as a chairman of AP State Level Police Recruitment Board (APSLPRB).

As an NTR Police Commissionerate, he launched ‘Cloud Patrol’ a drone patrolling initiative to check the consumption of liquor at open places, ganja peddling and consumption, and eve teasing. He also urged the public to dial 100/112 to report crimes against women. Under his guidance, investigation officers seized 1350 kg of ganja, arrested 267 smugglers, and opened 116 NDPS suspect sheets as reported by the Hindu Newspaper by the end of the year 2024.
