= Siddhartha Academy of Higher Education =

Engineering college in Andhra Pradesh, India

Coordinates: 16°29′07″N 80°41′34″E

- Former name: Velagapudi Ramakrishna Siddhartha Engineering College (VRSEC)
- Type: Deemed to be University
- Established: 1977
- Founder: Velagapudi Ramakrishna
- Principal: A V Ratna Prasad
- Faculty: 350+
- Administrative staff: 200+
- Students: 7000+
- Location: Kanuru, Vijayawada, Andhra Pradesh, India
- Campus: Suburban
- Nickname: SAHE
- Website: https://www.vrsiddhartha.ac.in/

Siddhartha Academy of Higher Education (formerly known as Velagapudi Ramakrishna Siddhartha Engineering College) is a Deemed to be University located in Vijayawada, Andhra Pradesh, India. It offers Undergraduate Education (UG) in Engineering and Postgraduate Education in Engineering, Business Administration, and Computer Applications. This institution is the first private institution to offer Engineering Education in the United Andhra Pradesh and was the first private institute to offer PG Programmes in Engineering in the year 1977. It was approved to be an Autonomous Institution by University Grants Commission (UGC) in the year 1977 and it was approved to be a Deemed to be University by the University Grants Commission (UGC) in the year 2024.

== Background ==
SAHE Deemed to be University is an educational institution run by Siddhartha Academy of General & Technical Education, better known as Siddhartha Academy.

SAHE is the first private institution in Andhra Pradesh that signed a MoU with National Forensic Sciences University, Ahmedabad. It is offering programmes on Forensics Science from 2024.

Siddhartha Academy of General & Technical Education came into being in the year 1975 with a Corpus Fund of Rs. 25 lakhs (Rs. 2.5 million). It was registered as a Society under the Societies Registration Act in the same year. The Academy says that its main objective is "to establish and run educational institutions offering education at all levels in the fields of general, technical & professional education".

As of 2024, Siddhartha Academy is running three Intermediate (10+2) Colleges, three Degree Colleges (offering Non-Technology UG & PG courses), a Deemed to be University, two Engineering Colleges, a Medical College, a Dental College, a Pharmacy College, two Nursing Institutions, a Law College, a College of Education (offering B.Ed courses), a Hotel Management College, and two Schools.

== Location ==
The institution is located on 24.05 acres (97,300 m^{2}) of land in Kanuru on the outskirts of Vijayawada city, at a distance of about 8 km (5.0 mi) from the city center, on the Vijayawada-Machilipatnam Highway (NH 65).

== Campus ==
The college has about 7000+ students, 350+ faculty (150+ Faculty with Ph.D.s & 100+ Faculty pursuing Ph.D.s), and 200+ technical and supporting staff. Extracurricular opportunities include NCC, NSS, Students Chapters of IEEE, Social Clubs, and Sports & Games.

== Academics ==
The institute is a Deemed to be University. The institute offers various UG and PG academic programs leading to the award of degrees such as B.Tech, M.Tech, MCA, and MBA with English as the medium of instruction. The programs are conducted in the Semester System and each semester provides for a minimum of 90 instructional days. The regulations in respect of the academic program of study are prepared and approved by the Academic Council, the highest academic body in the institute. The curriculum for the program of study is prepared by the respective board of studies and approved by the Academic Council.

== Rankings ==
University rankings

Engineering – India
- NIRF (2024): 151-200

The National Institutional Ranking Framework (NIRF) ranked the college between 151-200 in the engineering rankings in 2024.

== TIFAC-CORE ==
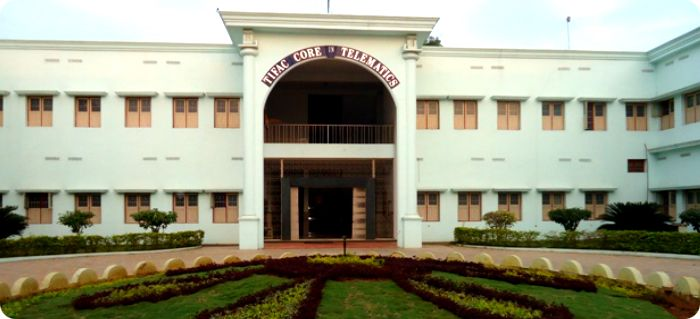
Research in Telematics, INDIA

TIFAC-CORE in Telematics is a collaborative effort of TIFAC (representing the government), SAHE, and private companies. The center was launched on 1 February 2009.

== Notable alumni ==
- Ram Gopal Varma, Filmmaker
- Lagadapati Rajagopal, Industrialist
