= Sujana Chowdary =

Indian politician

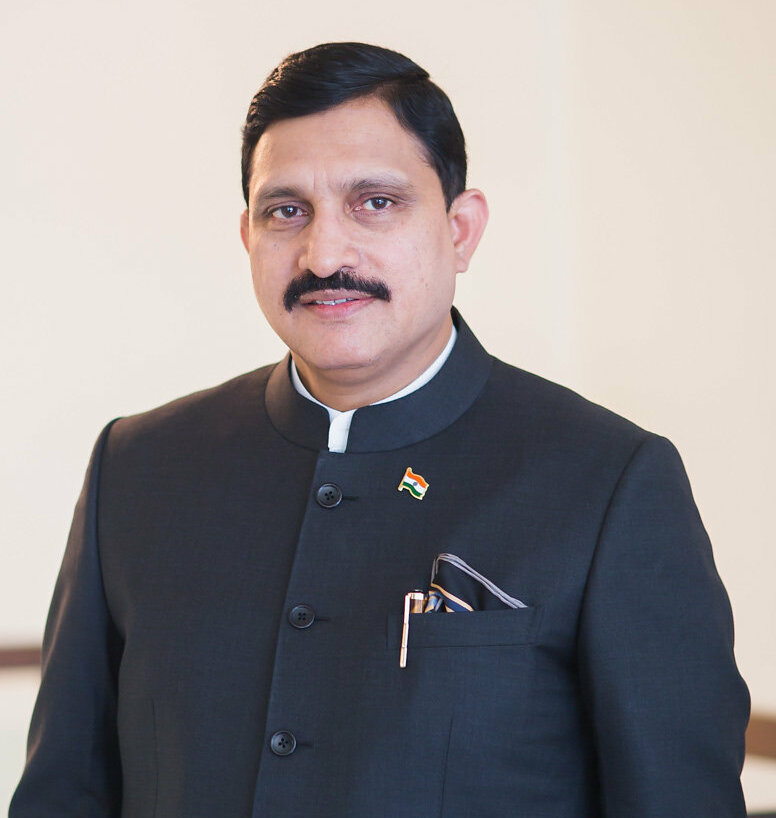

Member of Legislative Assembly Andhra Pradesh
- Incumbent
- Assumed office 4 June 2024
- Preceded by: Vellampalli Srinivas
- Constituency: Vijayawada West

Union Minister of State for Science & Technology
- In office 9 November 2014 – 8 March 2018
- Prime Minister: Narendra Modi
- Minister: Jitendra Singh; Harsh Vardhan

Member of Parliament, Rajya Sabha
- In office 22 June 2010 – 2 April 2022
- Preceded by: Gireesh Kumar Sanghi
- Constituency: Andhra Pradesh

Personal details
- Born: Yalamanchili Satyanarayana Chowdary; 2 June 1961 (age 65) Kanchikacherla, Krishna district, (present NTR district, Andhra Pradesh, India)
- Party: Bharatiya Janata Party
- Other political affiliations: Telugu Desam Party
- Spouse: Padmaja (m. 1989)
- Education: Chaitanya Bharathi Institute of Technology, Hyderabad; PSG College of Technology, Coimbatore
- Occupation: Businessman, politician
- Website: YSChowdary.com

Yalamanchili Satyanarayana Chowdary (born 2 June 1961), popularly known as Sujana Chowdary, is an Indian politician from Andhra Pradesh. He is a former Member of Parliament, Rajya Sabha, elected from the Telugu Desam Party and later moved to Bharatiya Janata Party. He was the Indian union Minister of State for Science, Technology from 9 November 2014 to 8 March 2018.

Sujana Chowdary contested and won the 2024 Elections from Vijayawada West Assembly Constituency and won with a margin of 47,032 votes.

== Early life and career ==
Sujana Chowdary was born in Kanchikacherla village in the Krishna district of Andhra Pradesh. He married Padmaja on 6 August 1989. The couple have two children, Y. S. Karthik and Y. Naga Chandini. He graduated in 1984 with a degree in Mechanical Engineering from the Chaitanya Bharathi Institute of Technology in Hyderabad. He completed his master's degree in Machine Tool Engineering from the PSG College of Technology in Coimbatore, Tamil Nadu. In 1986, he founded the Sujana Group of Companies and headed the Hyderabad-based group of Industries before retiring from business to join politics.

== Political career ==
Chowdary entered politics in 2010 when he was elected to the Rajya Sabha, India's upper house of Parliament, representing the Telugu Desam Party (TDP) from Andhra Pradesh on 22 June 2010.

On 9 November 2014, during the first expansion of the Council of Ministers of Prime Minister Narendra Modi's NDA Government (National Democratic Alliance (India)), Chowdary was appointed the Minister of State for Science & Technology, & Earth Sciences. He was elected as the TDP's Parliamentary Leader on 4 June 2014.

Chowdary served as member of the Indo-Singapore Parliamentary Friendship Group, jointly set up as a step towards strengthening bilateral ties between the two countries’ Parliaments. He was a member of the Government of India's Parliamentary Standing Committee on Commerce, the Parliamentary Forum on Youth, the Consultative Committee for the Ministry of Food Processing Industries.

== Sansad Adarsh Gram Yojana ==
Under the Sansad Adarsh Gram Yojana (SAGY) programme, Sujana Chowdary adopted Ponnavaram village, which is located about 60 km from Vijayawada in Krishna District of Andhra Pradesh. Under the programme, he has initiated the transformation of the place into a model village by implementing various development programs such as digital class rooms in the local government school, conducting medical camps, laying cement roads, building toilets for the households.

== Sujana Charitable Trust ==
The Sujana Charitable Trust and the Sujana Foundation, manifest the Sujana Group's Corporate Social Responsibility initiatives. The Foundation supports two schools for challenged children in Chennai, an Old Age Home in Hyderabad, and grants scholarships and merit awards for excellence to students in the areas of academics, sports, social entrepreneurship, innovation in engineering, agriculture, poverty alleviation and rural development.

== Controversy ==
Chowdary was under media scanner for an allegation by the Mauritius Commercial Bank Ltd of Mauritius on the grounds that the company defaulted on the Rs 1.92 billion loan it availed through its subsidiary. This allegation popped up a day after the Rajya Sabha MP-cum-industrialist was sworn in as a Union minister.

A clarification from the MP's office later said that he had not secured loan from the Mauritius Commercial Bank. It was his group firm – Sujana Universal Industries —that borrowed the funds and he only stood as a guarantor to the loan obtained by that step-down subsidiary.

On 23 and 24 November 2018, searches were conducted by Enforcement Directorate, at the residence and office of Sujana Chowdary in Hyderabad and Delhi. The agency claimed, the group of companies belonging to him defrauded banks to the tune of Rs 57 billion. The documents seized by the agency indicated that the group was controlling over 120 companies that were only on paper without any genuine business activities. Chowdary alleged that he was being targeted for political reasons and said he would take legal recourse against the ED. He claimed his companies were maintaining all records and the allegations made by the ED were baseless.
