= Vellampalli Srinivas =

Indian politician

Vellampalli Srinivasa Rao

Minister of Endowments Government of Andhra Pradesh
- In office 8 June 2019 – 7 April 2022
- Governor: E. S. L. Narasimhan (2019); Biswabhusan Harichandan (2019-2022)
- Chief Minister: Y. S. Jagan Mohan Reddy
- Preceded by: President's Rule
- Succeeded by: Kottu Satyanarayana

Member of Legislative Assembly Andhra Pradesh
- In office 2019–2024
- Preceded by: Jaleel Khan
- Succeeded by: Sujana Chowdary
- Constituency: Vijayawada West
- In office 2009–2014
- Preceded by: Shaik Nasar Vali
- Succeeded by: Jaleel Khan
- Constituency: Vijayawada West

Personal details
- Born: Vijayawada, India
- Party: YSR Congress Party (2016-present)
- Other political affiliations: Bharatiya Janata Party (2014-2016); Praja Rajyam Party (2008-2011)
- Children: 1 (daughter)

Vellampalli Srinivasa Rao is an Indian politician.

He was born in Vijayawada, Andhra Pradesh, the son of Vellampalli Suryanarayana. He was elected as MLA in 2009 & 2019 in Andhra Pradesh. He Served as Endowments Minister in the Andhra Pradesh Government.
