= Kesineni Nani =

Indian businessman and politician

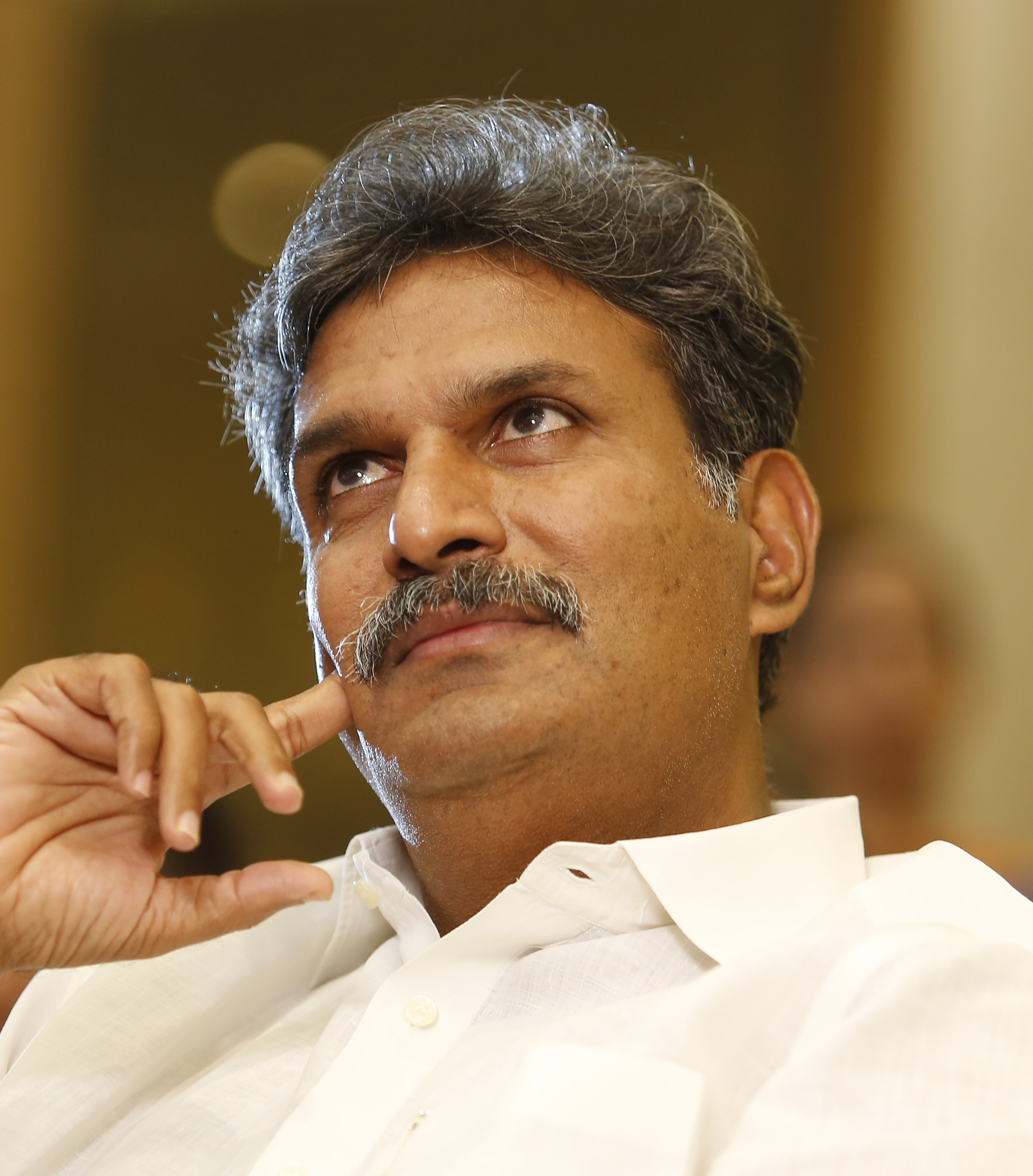
- Nani in 2015

Member of Parliament, Lok Sabha
- In office 16 May 2014 – 4 June 2024
- Preceded by: Lagadapati Rajagopal
- Succeeded by: Kesineni Sivanath
- Constituency: Vijayawada

Personal details
- Born: 22 January 1966 (age 60) Vijayawada, Andhra Pradesh, India
- Party: YSR Congress Party ( 10 th January 2024 to 10 th June 2024) 5 months
- Other political affiliations: Telugu Desam Party (until 2024); Praja Rajyam Party (2008–2009)
- Spouse: Pavani
- Children: 2
- Website: https://mpvijayawada.com

Kesineni Srinivas, commonly known as Kesineni Nani, is an entrepreneur and a former politician. He previously represented Vijayawada Parliamentary constituency as a Member of Parliament.

== Early and personal life ==
Kesineni Nani was born in Vijayawada to Ramaswamy Kesineni and Prasunamba Kesineni on 22 January 1966. He spent his entire childhood in the city along with his siblings. He married Smt. Pavani Kesineni on 16 April 1992 and has two daughters.

== Career ==
=== Political (2008–2024) ===
Nani joined the Praja Rajyam Party on 26 October 2008. He continued his services to the party for only 3 months, and he quit it in January 2009. He joined Telugu Desam Party (TDP) thereafter.

He was elected as a member of parliament from Vijayawada Lok Sabha constituency in the 2014 general elections from the Telugu Desam Party and re-elected from the same constituency in 2019.

At the Lok Sabha, Nani is currently a member of the Indian Council of Medical Research committee. Earlier he was a member of the Committee on Privileges, Standing Committee on Urban Development and the Consultative Committee, Ministry of Rural Development, Panchayati Raj and Drinking Water and Sanitation.

On 10 January 2024, Nani resigned as the Member of Parliament and left TDP to join the YSR Congress Party.

Nani contested the 2024 Indian general election from Vijayawada Lok Sabha constituency representing YSR Congress Party. He was defeated by his own brother Kesineni Chinni by a victory with a margin of 2,82,085 votes.

On 10 June 2024, Nani announced that he will step away from politics and end his political career. He also stated that he will remain dedicated to the welfare and progress of Vijayawada.

=== Non-political ===
Kesineni Travels was started by Kesineni Nani's grandfather, Kesineni Venkaiah, in 1928 and has a legacy of 90 years. On 31 March 2018, Nani voluntarily shut down the operations of the historic travel agency (which operated over 170 luxury buses) following a high-profile dispute with the Andhra Pradesh Transport Commissioner. He protested the alleged "illegal operations" of rival private bus operators running without permits and paying no taxes. Nani decided to close his lucrative business to ensure his personal business interests would not bring political disgrace to his party at the time (TDP).

== Electoral History ==
=== Lok Sabha ===
Year	Constituency	Party	Votes	%	Opponent	Party	Votes	%	Result	Margin	%
2014	Vijayawada	TDP	5,92,953	49.45	Koneru Rajendra Prasad	YCP	5,18,239	43.22	Won	+74,714	+6.23
2019	Vijayawada	TDP	5,75,498	45.04	Potluri V. Prasad	YCP	5,66,772	44.36	Won	+8,726	+0.68
2024	Vijayawada	YCP	5,12,069	37.79	Kesineni Sivanath	TDP	7,94,154	58.60	Lost	-2,82,085	-20.81
