= Velagapudi Ramakrishna =

Indian tycoon and philanthropist (1896–1968)

- Born: March 4, 1896; Nagaram, India
- Died: November 28, 1968 (aged 72)
- Father: Velagapudi Venkata Subbayya Chowdary

Velagapudi Ramakrishna CIE, (1896–1968) was an Indian Civil Service (ICS) officer, industrialist, and philanthropist. He started the KCP (Krishna Commercial Products) group of companies in 1941 with a co-operative sugar factory in Andhra Pradesh. He was a pioneering industrialist in the erstwhile Madras State.

== Family ==
Ramakrishna was born in a Telugu-speaking landowning Kamma family to Velagapudi Venkata Subbayya Chowdary in 1896 in the village Bellamvaripalem (Nagaram mandal, near Repalle) in the Guntur district of India. He studied at The University of Edinburgh and acquired B.Sc. and M.A. degrees. He further was affiliated with the London School of Economics. His father (pre-adoption surname: Katragadda) originally came from Tellapadu, Maddipadu Mandal, in Prakasam District.

Ramakrishna died in 1968 and was survived by two sons and a daughter: V. Maruthi Rao, V. Lakshmana Dutt, and Rajeshwari Ramakrishnan.

Ramakrishna's second son, V. L. Dutt, a past chairman of the Federation of Indian Chambers of Commerce and Industry (FICCI), was the chairman and managing director of KCP Limited. His wife, Indira Dutt, is a daughter of the Raja of Muktyala and the President of the World Telugu Federation. Ramakrishna's daughter, Smt. Rajeswari Ramakrishnan, is the managing director of Jeypore Sugar Company Limited. Her son R. Prabhu is the Congress MP from the Nilgiris (Ooty), Tamil Nadu, a five-term Member of Parliament and a former Union minister in India.

== Positions held ==
- District Collector
- Director, Department of Industries
- Commissioner, Labour
- Development Commissioner, Government of Madras
- Member of Parliament

== Memorial institutions ==
- The Velagapudi Ramakrishna Siddhartha Engineering College, near Vijayawada has been posthumously named after him.
- He also funded the VSR & NVR College in Tenali and the Sri Velagapudi Ramakrishna Memorial College in Nagaram, Guntur district.
- The Andhra Chamber of Commerce building in Chennai has also been named after Velagapudi Ramakrishna.
- V Ramakrishna Polytechnic in Thiruvottiyur, Near Chennai is an institution within KCP campus and is named in memory of Velagapudi Ramakrishna.
