= Bonda Umamaheswara Rao =

Indian politician

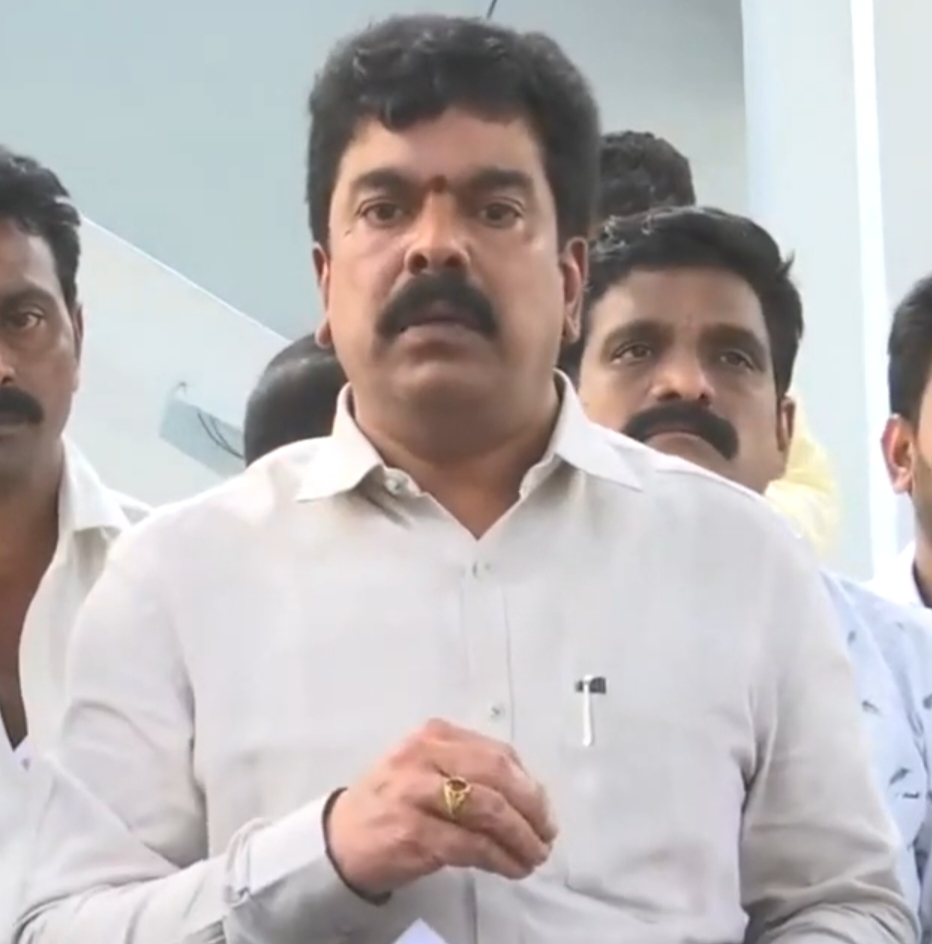
- Bonda Uma in 2022

Member of Legislative Assembly Andhra Pradesh
- In office 2024–Incumbent
- Preceded by: Malladi Vishnu
- Constituency: Vijayawada Central

Member of Legislative Assembly Andhra Pradesh
- In office 2014–2019
- Preceded by: Malladi Vishnu
- Succeeded by: Malladi Vishnu
- Constituency: Vijayawada Central

Personal details
- Born: Bonda Umamaheswara Rao; 30 January 1966 (age 60) Vijayawada, Andhra Pradesh, India
- Party: Telugu Desam Party
- Children: 2
- Occupation: Politician
- Website: www.bondauma.in

Bonda Umamaheswara Rao is an Indian politician and a current member of the Andhra Pradesh Legislative Assembly for Vijayawada Central constituency. He is politburo member of the Telugu Desam Party and TTD Board Member.

== Biography ==
=== Early life ===
Bonda Umamaheswara Rao was born to Sri. Kanaka Rao and Smt. Pushpavathi at Vijayawada, Krishna district, Andhra Pradesh, India on 30 January 1966. Bonda Umamaheswara Rao is married to Sujatha. The couple has two children.

=== Political ===
Uma began his political career as a party worker of the Telugu Desam Party and rose to the ranks of the state general secretary. He was elected MLA of the Vijayawada Central constituency.

== Positions held ==
- Telugu Desam PartyTDP polit bureau member
- State Telugu Desam Party General Secretary
- TTD board member

Legislative Assembly

- 2014 : Elected from Vijayawada Central constituency
- 12 November 2024: Whip in Assembly
