= Rajagopal Sreeram =

Indian politician (born 1965)

Member of the Andhra Pradesh Legislative Assembly
- Incumbent
- Assumed office 4 June 2024
- Preceded by: Samineni Udayabhanu
- Constituency: Jaggayyapeta
- In office 16 May 2009 – 23 May 2019
- Preceded by: Samineni Udayabhanu
- Succeeded by: Samineni Udayabhanu
- Constituency: Jaggayyapeta

Personal details
- Born: 23 July 1964 (age 62)
- Party: Telugu Desam Party

Rajagopal Sreeram (born 23 July 1964) is an Indian politician from Andhra Pradesh. He is a member of Telugu Desam Party.

== Political career ==
Sreeram was first elected as the Member of the Legislative Assembly representing the Jaggayyapeta Assembly constituency in the 2009 Andhra Pradesh Legislative Assembly elections. He was re-elected from the same constituency in the 2014 and 2024 legislative assembly elections.

== Electoral performance ==
2024 Andhra Pradesh Legislative Assembly election: Jaggayyapeta
Party	Candidate	Votes	%	±%
TDP	Rajagopal Sreeram	98,479	52.98	
YSRCP	Samineni Udayabhanu	82,502	44.38	
INC	Apparao Karnati	2,527	1.36	
NOTA	None of the above	773	0.42	
Majority		15,977	8.6	
Turnout		1,85,887		
TDP gain from YSRCP		Swing		

2019 Andhra Pradesh Legislative Assembly election: Jaggayyapeta
Party	Candidate	Votes	%	±%
YSRCP	Samineni Udayabhanu	87,965	49.95	
TDP	Rajagopal Sreeram	83,187	47.23	
Majority		4,778	2.72	
Turnout		176.115	89.74	+6.27
YSRCP gain from TDP		Swing		

2014 Andhra Pradesh Legislative Assembly election: Jaggayyapeta
Party	Candidate	Votes	%	±%
TDP	Rajagopal Sreeram	80,939	48.84	
YSRCP	Samineni Udayabhanu	79,093	47.73	
Majority		1,846	1.11	
Turnout		165,720	89.61	+1.42
TDP hold		Swing		

2009 Andhra Pradesh Legislative Assembly election: Jaggayyapeta
Party	Candidate	Votes	%	±%
TDP	Rajagopal Sreeram	75,107	50.67	+6.13
INC	Samineni Udayabhanu	65,429	44.14	−9.32
Majority		9,678	6.53	
Turnout		148,234	88.19	+7.59
TDP gain from INC		Swing		
