= Kesineni Chinni =

Indian politician (born 1969)

Kesineni Sivanath (Chinni)
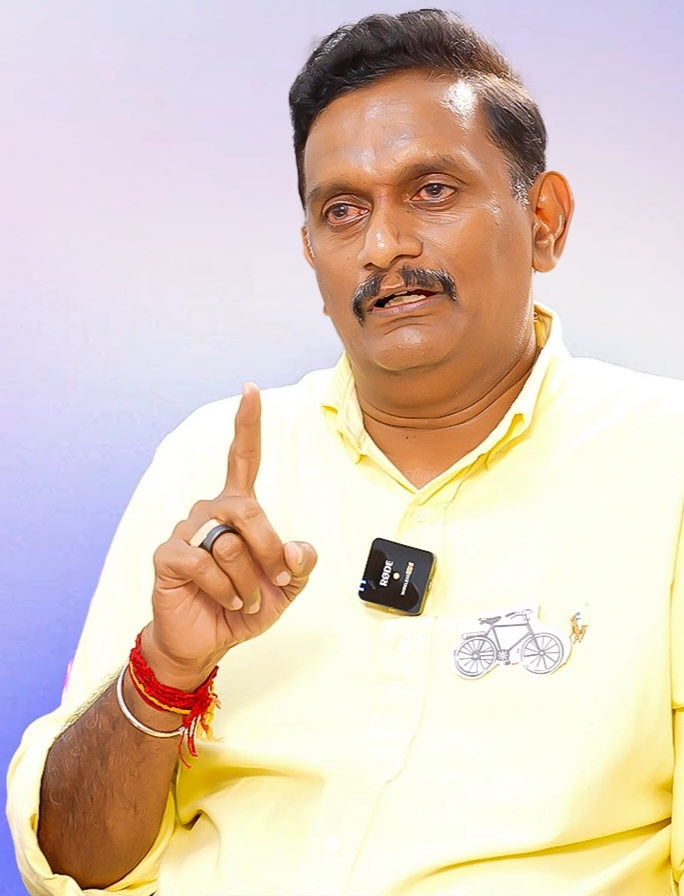

Member of Parliament, Lok Sabha
- Incumbent
- Assumed office 4 June 2024
- Preceded by: Kesineni Nani
- Constituency: Vijayawada

Personal details
- Born: 3 August 1969 (age 56) Palakollu, Andhra Pradesh, India
- Party: Telugu Desam Party
- Spouse: Janaki Kesineni (m. 1995)
- Children: Venkat Chowdary Kesineni; Snigdha Kesineni
- Parents: Ramaswamy Kesineni (father); Prasunamba Kesineni (mother)
- Occupation: Politician; Businessman
- Website: https://kesinenisivanath.com/

Kesineni Sivanath, commonly known as Kesineni Chinni (born 3 August 1969), is an Indian politician and entrepreneur. He is a member of the Telugu Desam Party and serves as the Member of Parliament for the Vijayawada Lok Sabha constituency.

== Personal life ==
Chinni was born in Palakollu to Kesineni Ramaswamy and Prasunamba on 3 August 1969. He married Smt. Janaki Kesineni and has two Children named Venkat and Snigdha. Sivanath completed his schooling in little flower school in Mudenappali, Krishna dist later on studied intermediate at Gowtham Residential college, Vijayawada. Sivanath completed his Bachelor of Engineering in Mechanical engineering in the year 1991 from Arulmigu Meenakshi Amman College of Engineering, Kanchipuram

== Political ==
Sivanath won the 2024 Indian general election from Vijayawada Lok Sabha constituency representing Telugu Desam Party. He defeated his own brother Kesineni Nani of YSR Congress Party by a landslide victory with a record margin of 2,82,085 votes.

== Election statistics ==
	Year	Contested For	Party	Constituency	Opponent	Votes	Majority	Result
1	2024	MP	Telugu Desam Party	Vijayawada	Kesineni Nani (YSRCP)	7,94,154 - 5,12,069	2,82,085	Won
