= Vangaveeti Ratna Kumari =

Indian politician

Vangaveeti Ratna Kumari is an Indian politician from Andhra Pradesh. She is a former two time member of the Andhra Pradesh Legislative Assembly from the Vijayawada East Assembly constituency in Krishna district, representing the Indian National Congress.

== Early life ==
Kumari is from Vijayawada, Krishna district, Andhra Pradesh. Her maiden name was Chennupati. She married Vangaveeti Mohana Ranga, a Congress MLA and together they had a son, Vangaveeti Radhakrishna, also an MLA from the same seat in 2004, and a daughter, Asha Kiran.

== Career ==
Kumari became an MLA for the first time in 1989 winning the Vijayawada East Assembly constituency in the 1989 Andhra Pradesh Legislative Assembly election representing the Indian National Congress (Indira). She polled 68,301 votes and defeated her nearest rival, N.Sivaram Prasad of the Telugu Desam Party, by a margin of 25,328 votes. She retained the seat for the Congress party winning the 1994 Andhra Pradesh Legislative Assembly election where she garnered 44,783 votes and beat her closest opponent, Jayaraju BS of the Telugu Desam Party, by a margin of 16,184 votes.
