= Vijayawada Municipal Corporation =

Local civic body in Vijayawada, Andhra Pradesh, India

Vijayawada Municipal Corporation Vijayavāḍa Nagara Pālaka Saṃstha
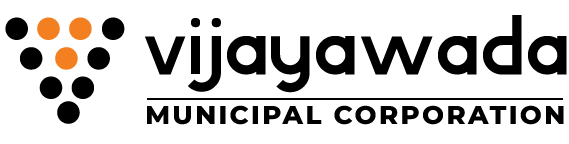

Type
- Type: Municipal Corporation

History
- Founded: 1888 (138 years ago)

Leadership
- Mayor: Vangaveeti Radha Krishna, JSP
- Deputy mayor: Vacant
- Municipal commissioner: Dhyanachandra H.M, I.A.S

Structure
- Seats: 86 wards
- Political groups: Government (76) Kutami (76): TDP (53); JSP (19); BJP (4); Opposition (10): YSRCP (8); CPI(M) (1); IND (1)

Elections
- Last election: 1 November 2026
- Next election: 2031

Meeting place
- Nehru Building, Canal Road, One Town, Vijayawada

Website
- Official website

Vijayawada Municipal Corporation (VMC) is the civic body that governs the city of Vijayawada, second largest city in the Indian state of Andhra Pradesh.

== History ==
The Vijayawada Municipality was created on 1 April 1888. It was named as a selection grade municipality in 1960 and to corporation in 1981. In 1985, Gunadala, Patamata and Bhavanipuram village panchayats, Payakapuram, Kundavari Kandrika were merged into the corporation.

== Administration ==
Vijayawada Municipal Corporation

The area of Vijayawada Municipal Corporation is 61.88 km^{2} (23.89 mi^{2}). The city constitutes 86 political wards.

The corporation is administered by an elected body headed by the Mayor. The corporation population as per the 2011 census was 1,039,518 with 527,307 males and a female population of 512,211. The present mayor is Rayana Bhagyalakshmi and the municipal commissioner is Dhyanachandra H.M, IAS.

== Civic services ==
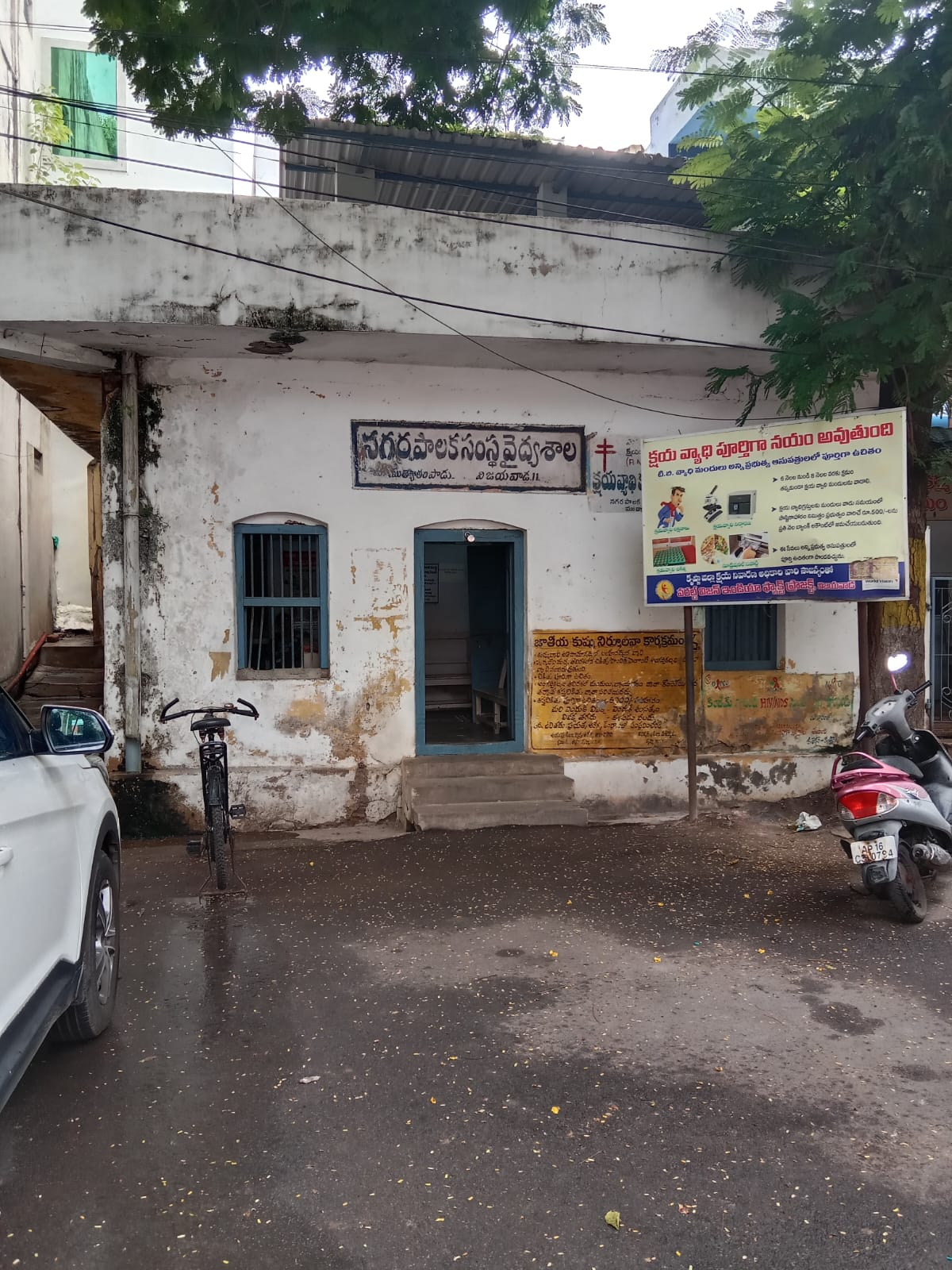
Municipal Corporation Hospital, Vijayawada

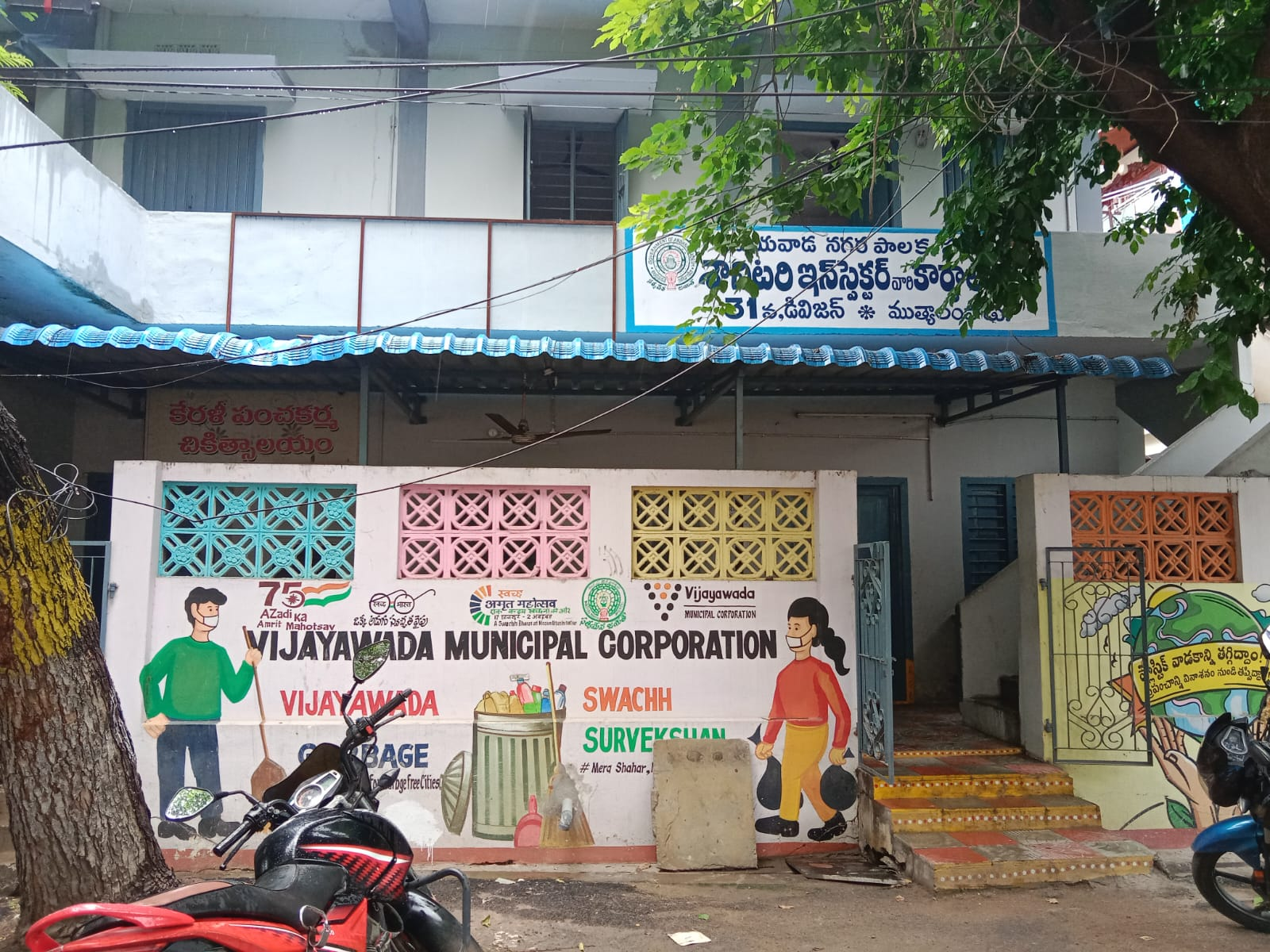
Office of Santitary Inspector, 31st division muthyalampaadu.

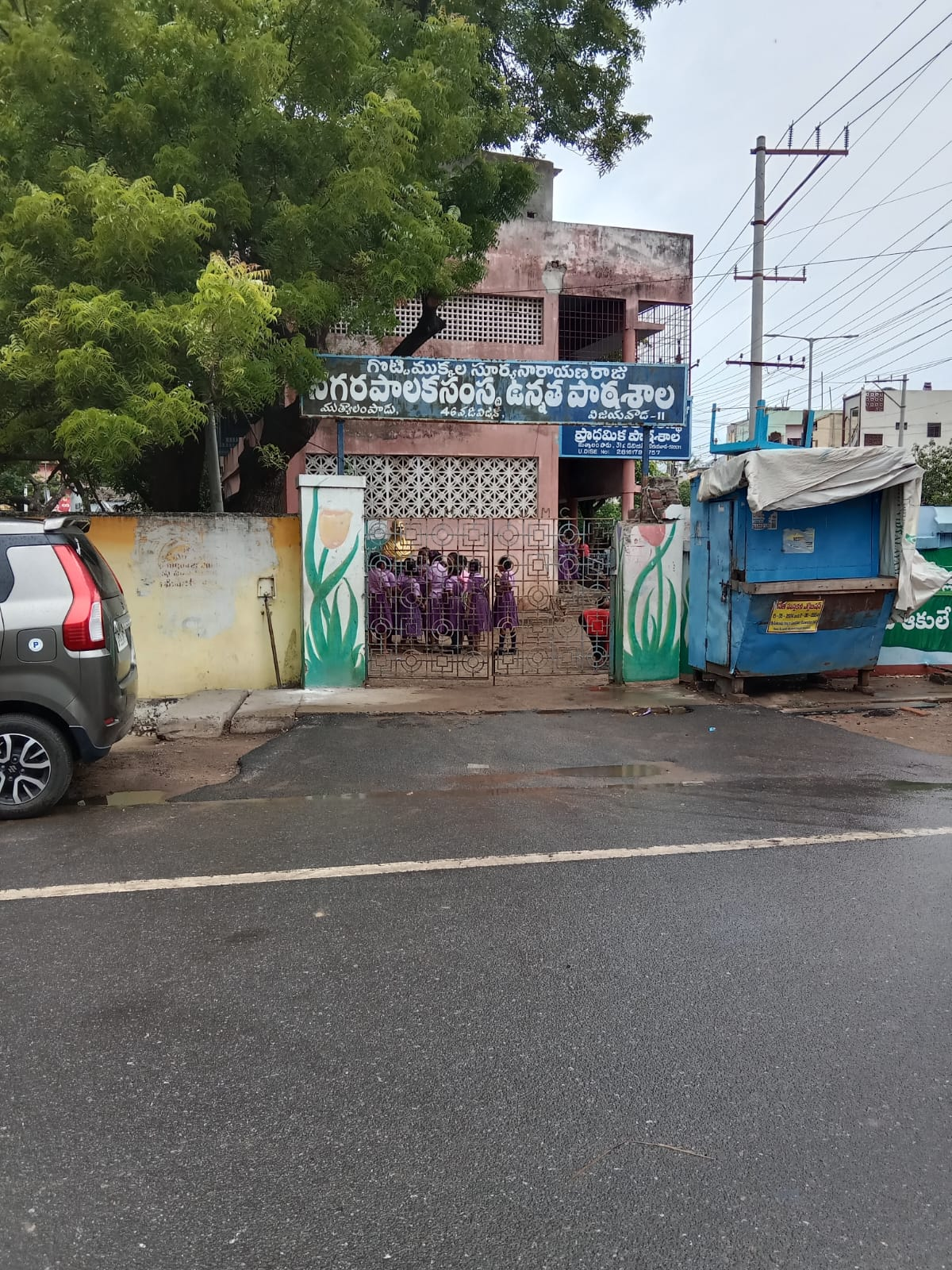
Municipal Corporation High School. Muthayalampadu,Vijayawada-2

The corporation provides protected drinking water to its public and is the forerunner in the state with everyday supply of 39 million US gallons (150 megalitres) water to the city residents. The other services undertaken by the corporation authorities are: Internal roads extension; underground drainage project with JNNURM; solid waste management which is recycled at waste to energy plants for power production; health centers; maternity hospitals; schools from elementary to high schools and even providing midday meals to students.

The Krishna River, groundwater and overhead tanks are the source of drinking water for the city residents. The underground and open draining systems are implemented for wastewater. There are also sewage treatment plants and the Budameru, Gundutippa, Islampeta and HB drains are utilised for draining out wastewater. The Railway dumping yard is utilised for solid waste dumping and some of the solid waste produced is made useful by converting them into manures.

== Functions ==
Vijayawada Municipal Corporation is created for the following functions:

- Planning for the town including its surroundings which are covered under its Department's Urban Planning Authority.
- Approving construction of new buildings and authorising use of land for various purposes.
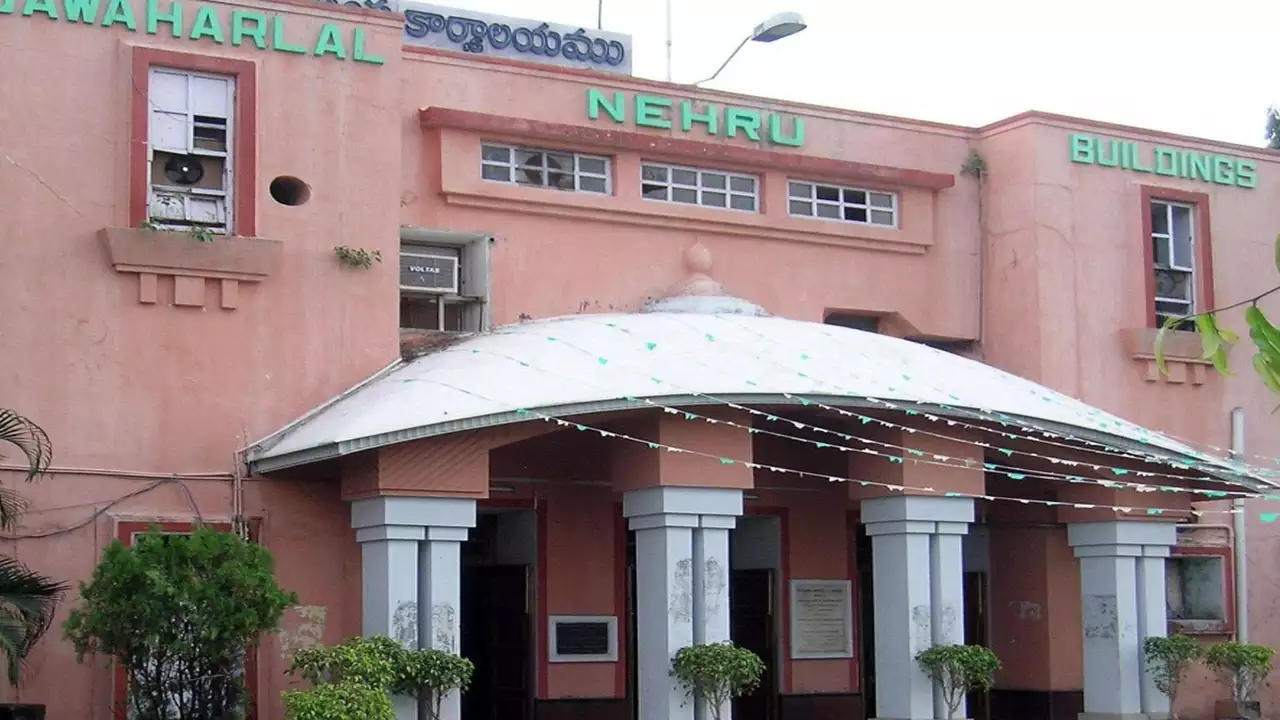
- Meeting Place of VMC
  Improvement of the town's economic and social status,
- Arrangements of water supply towards commercial, residential and industrial purposes.
- Planning for fire contingencies through Fire Service Departments.
- Creation of solid waste management, public health system and sanitary services.
- Working for the development of ecological aspect like development of Urban Forestry and making guidelines for environmental protection.
- Working for the development of weaker sections of the society like mentally and physically handicapped, old-age and gender-biased people.
- Making efforts for improvement of slums and poverty removal in the town.

== Revenue sources ==
The following are the Income sources for the corporation from the Central and State Government.

=== Revenue from taxes ===
Following is the Tax related revenue for the corporation.

- Property tax.
- Profession tax.
- Entertainment tax.
- Grants from Central and State Government like Goods and Services Tax.
- Advertisement tax.

=== Revenue from non-tax sources ===
Following is the Non Tax related revenue for the corporation.

- Water usage charges.
- Fees from Documentation services.
- Rent received from municipal property.
- Funds from municipal bonds.

=== Infrastructure ===
Certain municipal sporting infrastructure in the city are maintained by the corporation, which includes, Indira Gandhi Stadium, indoor stadiums, swimming pools and Gymnasiums. There are parks and open spaces as part of city greenery projects.

== Awards and achievements ==
Accolades and awards won by VMC include:

- National Urban Water Award (2009)
- CRISIL Best Practices Award for the "Siti e-Governance" Project
- CSI Nihilent runner-up award was conferred by Ministry of Information and Technology
- Stockholm Challenge Award finalist
- ISO 9001 Certified for Quality Management System

== Elections ==
2026 VMC election

22 wards were added, taking the total count of wards to 86.

Party	Symbol	Won	+/-
Telugu Desam Party		53	▲39
YSR Congress Party		08	▼41
Jana Sena Party		19	▲19
Bharatiya Janata Party		4	▲4
Communist Party of India (Marxist)		1	Steady
Independent		1	Steady

=== 2021 VMC election ===
Five wards were added, taking the total count of wards to 64.

No.	Party	Symbol	Won	+/-
1	YSR Congress Party		49	▲30
2	Telugu Desam Party		14	▼24
3	Communist Party of India (Marxist)		1	Steady
4	Independent		1	

=== 2014 VMC election ===
In 2014, there were 59 wards in the corporation.

No.	Party	Symbol	Won	+/-
1	Telugu Desam Party		38	▲28
2	YSR Congress Party		19	new
3	Communist Party of India (Marxist)		1	Steady
4	Bharatiya Janata Party		1	▲1
5	Communist Party of India		0	▼1

=== 2005 VMC election ===
Elections were held to the 59 wards in the corporation.

No.	Party	Symbol	Won	+/-
1	Indian National Congress		29	
2	Telugu Desam Party		10	
3	Communist Party of India (Marxist)		14	
4	Communist Party of India		14	
5	Independents		3	

== Expansion ==
There are numerous proposals to expand the city limits over decades into Greater Municipal Corporation.

== See also ==
- List of municipal corporations in Andhra Pradesh
