= List of census towns in Andhra Pradesh =

The article lists census towns in the Indian state of Andhra Pradesh. The statistical data is based on 2011 Census of India, conducted by the Office of the Registrar General and Census Commissioner, under Ministry of Home Affairs, Government of India.

== Census town ==
A census town is one which has urban characteristics but is not notified as a statutory town. These towns should have a minimum population of 5,000, at least 50% of male working population is employed outside the agricultural sector and minimum population density of 400 persons per km^{2}.

== Statistics ==
As of 2011 census of India, the state of Andhra Pradesh has a total of 104 census towns in 13 districts. Guntur district has the least with only 1. Kanuru of Krishna district is the most populated and Arempudi of East Godavari district is the least populated census towns of the state. In terms of area, Podili of Prakasam district has the largest area of 43.88 km^{2} (16.94 sq mi) and Modameedipalle of Kadapa district is the smallest with an area of 0.90 km^{2} (0.35 sq mi).

Notes

- Gooty and Kalyandurg of Anantapur district, Sullurpeta of Nellore district, Palakonda of Srikakulam district and Nellimarla of Vizianagaram district were upgraded as municipalities.
- Dowleswaram, Hukumpeta and Katheru of East Godavari district were merged into Rajahmundry Municipal Corporation.

== List ==
S.No.	District	Census town	Population (2011)	Area	Total	Ref
1	Anantapur	Anantapur	15,247	21.30	7	
2	Anantapur	Kakkalapalle	30,128	16.01	7	
3	Anantapur	Narayanapuram	14,227	9.90	7	
4	Anantapur	Papampeta	13,850	3.78	7	
5	Anantapur	Somandepalle	18,895	30.34	7	
6	Anantapur	Uravakonda	35,565	30.28	7	
7	Anantapur	Yenumalapalle	10,482	12.57	7	
1	East Godavari	Arempudi	1,546	6.32	7	
2	East Godavari	Bandarulanka	11,470	4.97	7	
3	East Godavari	Chidiga	6,365	1.90	7	
4	East Godavari	Morampudi	15,346	7.54	7	
5	East Godavari	Ramanayyapeta	28,369	9.99	7	
6	East Godavari	Rampachodavaram	9,952	4.99	7	
7	East Godavari	Suryaraopeta	24,112	9.20	7	
1	Guntur	Vaddeswaram	6,275	3.30	1	
1	Kadapa	Chennamukkapalle	7,065	3.05	11	
2	Kadapa	Dommara Nandyala	8,337	12.68	11	
3	Kadapa	Gopavaram	22,936	5.92	11	
4	Kadapa	Mangampeta	5,175	5.10	11	
5	Kadapa	Modameedipalle	11,397	0.90	11	
6	Kadapa	Moragudi	6,812	4.64	11	
7	Kadapa	Muddanur	9,775	17.87	11	
8	Kadapa	Nagireddipalle	12,318	5.82	11	
9	Kadapa	Rameswaram	19,483	13.94	11	
10	Kadapa	Veparala	6,712	11.26	11	
11	Kadapa	Yerraguntla	32,574	5.32	11	
1	Krishna	Guntupalli	11,187	10.26	11	
2	Krishna	Ibrahimpatnam	29,432	15.00	11	
3	Krishna	Kankipadu	14,616	3.37	11	
4	Krishna	Kanuru	49,006	9.02	11	
5	Krishna	Kondapalli	33,373	15.00	11	
6	Krishna	Nadim Tiruvuru	18,567	10.49	11	
7	Krishna	Poranki	25,545	11.78	11	
8	Krishna	Prasadampadu	13,941	2.40	11	
9	Krishna	Ramavarappadu	22,222	3.30	11	
10	Krishna	Tadigadapa	17,462	5.77	11	
11	Krishna	Yanamalakuduru	34,177	4.17	11	
1	Kurnool	Mamidalapadu	26,694	8.43	2	
2	Kurnool	Thummalamenta	12,373	23.80	2	
1	Nandyal	Banaganapalle	20,749	8.43	5	
2	Nandyal	Banumukkala	14,307	13.99	5	
3	Nandyal	Bethamcherla	38,994	25.75	5	
4	Nandyal	Srisailam Project (RFC) Township	21,452	5.96	5	
5	Nandyal	Ramapuram	6,614	7.84	5	
1	Nellore	Buja Buja Nellore	10,927	2.81	1	
1	Tirupati	L.A. Sagaram	19,904	4.81	4	
2	Tirupati	Tada Khandrika	6,123	6.88	4	
3	Tirupati	Vinnamala	20,924	8.00	4	
4	Tirupati	Yerrabalem	7,803	1.36	4	
1	Markapuram	Cumbum	15,169	8.81	5	
2	Markapuram	Giddaluru	35,150	20.94	5	
3	Markapuram	Kanigiri	37,420	33.06	5	
4	Markapuram	Pamur	20,000	16.15	5	
5	Markapuram	Podili	31,145	43.88	5	
1	Prakasam	Mulaguntapadu	7,145	3.38	2	
2	Prakasam	Singarayakonda	19,400	11.20	2	
1	Bapatla	Chirala	30,858	23.70	2	
2	Bapatla	Vetapalem	38,671	11.14	2	
1	Srikakulam	Balaga	30,858	23.70	7	
2	Srikakulam	Hiramandalam	6,603	2.55	7	
3	Srikakulam	Narasannapeta	26,280	5.18	7	
4	Srikakulam	Ponduru	12,640	11.07	7	
5	Srikakulam	Sompeta	18,778	11.10	7	
6	Srikakulam	Tekkali	28,631	13.58	7	
7	Srikakulam	Singupuram	12,273	20.00	7	
1	Visakhapatnam	Bowluvada	5,001	6.89	12	
2	Visakhapatnam	Chodavaram	20,251	16.88	12	
3	Visakhapatnam	Chintapalle	7,888	4.21	12	
4	Visakhapatnam	Gudivada	8,787	1.00	12	
5	Visakhapatnam	Kantabamsuguda	6,714	1.62	12	
6	Visakhapatnam	Mulakuddu	4,513	4.90	12	
7	Visakhapatnam	Nakkapalle	7,603	6.73	12	
8	Visakhapatnam	Narsipatnam	33,757	6.83	12	
9	Visakhapatnam	Peda Boddepalle	12,781	10.59	12	
10	Visakhapatnam	Payakaraopeta	27,001	2.59	12	
11	Visakhapatnam	Upper Sileru Project Site Camp	4,632	3.77	12	
12	Visakhapatnam	Yelamanchili	27,265	10.36	12	
1	Vizianagaram	Cheepurupalle	14,847	3.48	9	
2	Vizianagaram	Chintalavalasa	5,921	3.59	9	
3	Vizianagaram	Gajapathinagaram	5,687	1.04	9	
4	Vizianagaram	Jarjapupeta	5,761	2.30	9	
5	Vizianagaram	Kanapaka	5,960	5.30	9	
6	Vizianagaram	Kothavalasa	14,321	7.60	9	
7	Vizianagaram	Malicherla	33,757	6.83	9	
8	Vizianagaram	Sriramnagar	18,893	7.72	9	
9	Vizianagaram	Tummikapalle	4,911	2.95	9	
1	West Godavari	Dwarakatirumala	5,543	2.18	5	
2	West Godavari	Gavaravaram	10,029	1.40	5	
3	West Godavari	Sanivarapupeta	8,142	1.70	5	
4	West Godavari	Satrampadu	6,393	1.40	5	
5	West Godavari	Tangellamudi	8,250	4.80	5	
Total					104	
