= Chodavaram =

Chodavaram may refer to:

- Chodavaram, Anakapalli district, a village in Andhra Pradesh, India
- Chodavaram, Nagayalanka mandal, a village the Nagayalanka mandal of Krishna district of Andhra Pradesh, India
- Chodavaram, Vijayawada, a village in Penamaluru mandal of Krishna district in Andhra Pradesh, India
- Chodavaram, Konaseema district, a village in Andhra Pradesh, India
- Chodavaram, Prakasam district, a village in Andhra Pradesh, India
- Chodavaram (East), a village in the Nallajerla mandal of West Godavari district of Andhra Pradesh, India
- Chodavaram (West), a village in the Nallajerla mandal of West Godavari district of Andhra Pradesh, India
- Chodavaram Assembly constituency
