= Chowdavaram =

Chowdavaram may refer to:

- Chowdavaram, Guntur, a suburb of Guntur city, Andhra Pradesh, India
- Chowdavaram OW, a village in Vemsoor mandal, Khammam district, Telangana, India
- Chodavaram, Visakhapatnam district, a village in Visakhapatnam district, Andhra Pradesh, India
- Chodavaram, Nagayalanka mandal, a village in Nagayalanka mandal, Krishna district, Andhra Pradesh, India
- Chodavaram, Penamaluru mandal, a village in Penamaluru mandal, Krishna district, Andhra Pradesh, India
- Chodavaram, East Godavari district, a village in East Godavari district, Andhra Pradesh, India
- Chodavaram, Prakasam district, a village in Prakasam district, Andhra Pradesh, India
