= Sriramnagar =

Sriramnagar may refer to places in India:

- Sriramnagar, Ranga Reddy district, Andhra Pradesh
- Sriramnagar, Vizianagaram district, Andhra Pradesh
