= Tadigadapa =

- Town
- Location in Andhra Pradesh, India
- Coordinates: 16.4789°N 80.6905°E
- Country: India
- State: Andhra Pradesh
- District: Krishna
- Mandal: Penamaluru
- City: Vijayawada
- Metro: Andhra Pradesh Capital Region

Area
  - Total: 5.77 km^{2} (2.23 sq mi)

Population (2011)
  - Total: 17,462
  - Density: 3,030/km^{2} (7,840/sq mi)

Languages
  - Official: Telugu
- Time zone: UTC+5:30 (IST)
- PIN: 521137
- Vehicle registration: AP–16, AP–39

Tadigadapa is a town and suburb in Krishna district, Andhra Pradesh, India. It is a major industrial, commercial, educational and residential hub located in eastern part of Vijayawada. On 31 December 2020, the Government of Andhra Pradesh formed a first grade municipality by merging Yenamalakuduru, Kanuru, Tadigadapa and Poranki villages. Tadigadapa Municipality is a part of Vijayawada Urban Agglomeration, Vijayawada Metropolitan area and Andhra Pradesh Capital Region.

== Education ==
Primary and secondary school education is provided by the local government. Aided and private schools also function under the School Education Department of State. Instruction in schools is in English and/or Telugu.
