= Vemavaram =

Vemavaram may refer to:

- A. Vemavaram
- Vemavaram, Krishna district, Andhra Pradesh, India
