= Dommara Nandyal =

- Census Town
- Location in Andhra Pradesh, India
- Coordinates: 14°51′52″N 78°21′57″E
- Country: India
- State: Andhra Pradesh
- District: Cuddapah

Population (2001)
  - Total: 7,678

Languages
  - Official: Telugu
- Time zone: UTC+5:30 (IST)
- PIN: 516431

Dommara Nandyal is a census town in Mylavaram Mandal, Kadapa district, Andhra Pradesh, India. Dommara Nandyal is under the constituency of Jammalamadugu. Dommara Nandyal is situated along the bank of the Penna River. Mylavaram dam is constructed just 3 km away from it, that supplies water for drinking. Dommara Nandyal is also famous for people making silk sarees with their own hands. Veparala and Moragudi, beside of Dommaranadyala, are also the handloom towns.

In the village, people of all religions are living together. There are religion temples of Rama, Shiva, Venkateswara, Hanuman and Mosque, Church, etc. where all the religions people are celebrating their festivals grandly. A major ceremony held is "Jyothi Uthsavas" in praise of Chaudeswari Devi popularly called Chowdamma thalli on 4th day of full moon in the month of Kartika or October/November every year (after the ten days of Vijayadashami). Ganesh Chaturthi is also celebrated very well. Here, it is not only the religion's temple but also the 5 national temples. The high school has well constructed buildings and playground. In spite of the huge competition from the present corporate studies, the students of this high school are showing their talent in ssc public exams by getting top marks in district level.

== Demographics ==
As of 2001 India census, Dommara Nandyal had a population of 7,678. Males constitute 51% of the population and females 49%. Dommara Nandyal has an average literacy rate of 54%, lower than the national average of 59.5%: male literacy is 67%, and female literacy is 40%. In Dommara Nandyal, 12% of the population is under 6 years of age.
