= Pedapulipaka =

- Neighbourhood
- Interactive map of Pedapulipaka
- Location within Andhra Pradesh
- Coordinates: 16°27′35″N 80°41′02″E
- Country: India
- State: Andhra Pradesh
- District: Krishna
- Mandal: Penamaluru
- Village: Vijayawada
- Metro: Andhra Pradesh Capital Region

Area
  - Total: 9.69 km^{2} (3.74 sq mi)

Population
  - Total: 2,571
  - Density: 265/km^{2} (687/sq mi)
- Time zone: UTC+05:30 (IST)
- Pincode: 521137

Pedapulipaka is a part of Vijayawada in Penamaluru Mandal of Krishna District, Andhra Pradesh.

== Government Bodies ==
Pedapulipaka's latest Government Leaders are

- Sarpanch/President was Mr Srinivas Choudhary from 2021 to 2026
- MLA is Mr. BODE PRASAD from 2024 to present
- MP is Mr. Vallabhaneni Balasouri from 2019 to present
- CM is Nara Chandrababu Babu Naidu 2024 to present
- PM is Mr. Narendra Modi from 2014 to present

== Geography ==
Pedapulipaka village (gram panchayat) is located in Penamaluru Mandal of Krishna district in Andhra Pradesh, India. It is 10 km away from sub-district headquarter Penamaluru, and 70 km away from district headquarter Machilipatnam.

- The total geographical area of village is 969 hectares.
- Pedapulipaka has a total population of 9,108 peoples.
- There are about 750 houses in Pedapulipaka village.
- Vijayawada is nearest town to Pedapulipaka which is approximately 8 km away.
- The nearest place is 5 km away west - Auto Nagar (old checkpost).
- The nearest village was 5 km away east - Tadigadapa.

== Transportation ==
There is no private transportation available here, such as auto rickshaws, cabs, and private buses, so people rely on APSRTC buses or personal vehicles such as bikes and cars.

== Education ==
There are both government and private education facilities in and near the village.

== Health Facilities ==
- There are first-aid centers available - run by reputed RMP Doctors.
- Time Hospital - is known as the best private hospital near Tadigadapa.

== Post Office and banking ==
- PIN Code is 521134
- Post Office is behind Panchayati Office Road.

== Agriculture ==
The village produces rice, sugarcane, corn and vegetables.
