= Guntupalle =

Guntupalle or Guntupalli may refer to:

- Guntupalli, NTR district, a village in NTR district, Andhra Pradesh, India
- Guntupalle, Eluru district, a village in Eluru district, Andhra Pradesh, India (known for its Buddhist monuments)
- Guntupalli Group of Buddhist Monuments, an archaeological site in Eluru district, Andhra Pradesh, India
