= Naginayani Cheruvu Thanda =

- Village
- Interactive map of Naginayani Cheruvu Thanda
- Location in Andhra Pradesh, India
- Coordinates: 14°1′1.50″N 77°38′38″E
- Country: India
- State: Andhra Pradesh
- District: Sri Sathya Sai

Population (2011)
  - Total: 1,078

Languages
  - Official: Telugu
- Time zone: UTC+5:30 (IST)

Naginayani Cheruvu Thanda is a village in Somandepalle mandal, Sri Sathya Sai district of Andhra Pradesh, India. It lies 3 km from the village of Somandepalle and 13 km from the town of Penukonda. Nestled between surrounding hills, this village has traditionally housed a farming and herding community.
