= Prasad V. Potluri Siddhartha Institute of Technology =

Higher education institution in Andhra Pradesh, India

Prasad V Potluri Siddhartha Institute of Technology
- Other names: PVPSIT, PVP Siddhartha Institute of Technology
- Established: 1998; 28 years ago
- Chairperson: Sri N. Venkateswarlu
- President: Dr. C. NageswaraRao
- Principal: Dr K. Sivaji Babu
- Location: Kanuru, Vijayawada, Andhra Pradesh, India
- Campus: 19.98 acres (8.09 ha)
- Website: pvpsit.ac.in

Prasad V. Potluri Siddhartha Institute of Technology, established in 1988, is a higher educational and self-financed institution located in Kanuru, NTR District, Vijayawada, Andhra Pradesh, India. It offers several higher educational courses like Bachelor of Technology and Master of Business Administration.

== History and establishment ==
The college was established in 1988. It was built using 19.98 acres of land. The college is sponsored by Siddhartha Academy of General and Technical Education, the organization that runs 18 educational institutions under it. It is Autonomous and approved by the All India Council for Technical Education (AICTE). It is permanently affiliated to Jawaharlal Nehru Technological University, Kakinada (JNTUK).

== Accreditations ==
The institution is accredited by the National Accreditation and Assessment Council with A+ grade. It is also accredited by the National Board of Accreditation (NBA) for all its undergraduate education programs. It is also an ISO 9001-2015 certified institution and provides quality standards to all its students. UGC has also accorded 2f/12B status.

== Achievements ==
The students of the institute secured the 2nd runner up position at the Smart India Hackathon, 2019. It is also declared as one of the nodal centres of Smart India Hackathon 2023.

== Facilities ==
PVPSIT provides a variety of facilities to enhance the student experience, including a central library, hostel, sports and games areas, gym, and internet access. The campus also features an auditorium, yoga and meditation areas, and a stationery store for students convenience.
