= Batlapalem =

- Village
- Interactive map of Batlapalem
- Location in Andhra Pradesh, India Batlapalem (India)
- Coordinates: 16.556209°N 81.981429°E
- Country: India
- State: Andhra Pradesh
- District: Konaseema
- Mandal: Amalapuram
- Elevation: 3 m (9.8 ft)

Languages
  - Official: Telugu
- Time zone: UTC+5:30 (IST)
- PIN: 533201
- Telephone code: 8856
- Vehicle registration: AP 05

Batlapalem is a village located in Amalapuram mandal, Konaseema district, Andhra Pradesh, India. It houses BVC Engineering College.
