= Rameswaram, Kadapa district =

Rameswaram
- Census Town
- Location in Andhra Pradesh, India
- Coordinates: 14.7527°N 78.5617°E
- Country: India
- State: Andhra Pradesh
- District: Cuddapah

Population (2001)
  - Total: 14,981

Languages
  - Official: Telugu
- Time zone: UTC+5:30 (IST)
- Vehicle registration: AP

Rameswaram is a census town in Cuddapah district inside Proddatur in the Indian state of Andhra Pradesh.

== Demographics ==
As of 2001 India census, Rameswaram had a population of 14,981. Males constitute 51% of the population and females 49%. Rameswaram has an average literacy rate of 48%, lower than the national average of 59.5%: male literacy is 59%, and female literacy is 37%. In Rameswaram, 14% of the population is under 6 years of age.

== Education ==
The primary and secondary school education is imparted by government, aided and private schools, under the School Education Department of the state. The medium of instruction followed by different schools are English, Telugu.

== See also ==
- List of census towns in Andhra Pradesh
