= Edarapalle =

- village
- Interactive map of Edarapalle
- Location in Andhra Pradesh, India Edarapalle (India)
- Coordinates: 16.5815°N 81.9980°E
- Country: India
- State: Andhra Pradesh
- District: Dr. B.R. Ambedkar Konaseema

Area
  - Total: 1.63 km^{2} (0.63 sq mi)

Population (2011)
  - Total: 6,170
  - Density: 3,785/km^{2} (9,800/sq mi)

Languages
  - Official: Telugu
- Time zone: UTC+5:30 (IST)
- Postal code: 533 446

Edarapalle is a village in Amalapuram Mandal, Dr. B.R. Ambedkar Konaseema district in the state of Andhra Pradesh in India.

== Geography ==
Edarapalle is located at 16.5815°N 81.9980°E.

== Demographics ==
As of 2011 India census, Edarapalle had a population of 6170, out of which 1043 were male and 1001 were female. The population of children below 6 years of age was 10%. The literacy rate of the village was 83%.
