= Vanne Chintalapudi =

- village
- Interactive map of Vanne Chintalapudi
- Location in Andhra Pradesh, India Vanne Chintalapudi (India)
- Coordinates: 16.5579°N 81.0385°E
- Country: India
- State: Andhra Pradesh
- District: Dr. B.R. Ambedkar Konaseema

Area
  - Total: 6.12 km^{2} (2.36 sq mi)

Population (2011)
  - Total: 5,204
  - Density: 850/km^{2} (2,200/sq mi)

Languages
  - Official: Telugu
- Time zone: UTC+5:30 (IST)
- Postal code: 533 446

Vanne Chintalapudi is a village in Amalapuram Mandal, Dr. B.R. Ambedkar Konaseema district in the state of Andhra Pradesh in India.

== Geography ==
Vanne Chintalapudi is located at 16.5579°N 81.0385°E.

== Demographics ==
As of 2011 India census, Vanne Chintalapudi had a population of 5204, out of which 2573 were male and 2631 were female. The population of children below 6 years of age was 10%. The literacy rate of the village was 79%.
