= Ibrahimpatnam mandal, NTR district =

Ibrahimpatnam mandal
- Mandal
- Interactive map of Ibrahimpatnam mandal
- Location in Andhra Pradesh, India
- Coordinates: 16°36′20″N 80°22′43″E
- Country: India
- State: Andhra Pradesh
- District: NTR
- Headquarters: Ibrahimpatnam

Area
  - Total: 104.81 km^{2} (40.47 sq mi)

Population (2011)
  - Total: 103,559
  - Density: 988.06/km^{2} (2,559.1/sq mi)

Languages
  - Official: Telugu
- Time zone: UTC+5:30 (IST)
- Vehicle registration: AP

Ibrahimpatnam mandal is one of the 20 mandals that constitute the NTR district of the State of Andhra Pradesh in India. It is under the administration of the Vijayawada revenue division and the mandal headquarters are located at Ibrahimpatnam town. The mandal is located on the banks of Krishna River and is bounded by Kanchikacherla, Veerullapadu, G. Konduru and Vijayawada (rural) mandals. The mandal is also a part of the Andhra Pradesh Capital Region under the jurisdiction of APCRDA.

== Demographics ==
As of 2011 census, the mandal had a population of 103,559. The total population constitute, 50,895 males and 52,664 females —a sex ratio of 1035 females per 1000 males. 10,856 children are in the age group of 0–6 years, of which 5,552 are boys and 5,304 are girls. The average literacy rate stands at 77.59% with 71,926 literates.

== Towns and villages ==
As of 2011 census, the mandal has 18 settlements. It includes 3 census towns and 15 villages.

The settlements in the mandal are listed below:

1. Chilukuru
2. Damuluru
3. Elaprolu
4. Gudurupadu
5. Guntupalli (CT)
6. Ibrahimpatnam (CT)
7. Jupudi
8. Kachavaram
9. Kethanakonda
10. Kondapalli (CT)
11. Kotikalapudi
12. Malkapuram
13. Mulapadu
14. N. Pothavaram
15. Trilochanapuram
16. Tummalapalem
17. Zami Machavaram
18. Zami Navi Pothavaram

Note: (CT)-Census town
