= Nallamilli, Amalapuram Mandal =

Nallamilli
- village
- Interactive map of Nallamilli
- Location in Andhra Pradesh, India Nallamilli (India)
- Coordinates: 16.6032°N 82.0084°E
- Country: India
- State: Andhra Pradesh
- District: Dr. B.R. Ambedkar Konaseema

Area
  - Total: 2.18 km^{2} (0.84 sq mi)

Population (2011)
  - Total: 1,996
  - Density: 916/km^{2} (2,370/sq mi)

Languages
  - Official: Telugu
- Time zone: UTC+5:30 (IST)
- Postal code: 533 577

Nallamilli is a village in Amalapuram Mandal, Dr. B.R. Ambedkar Konaseema district in the state of Andhra Pradesh in India.

== Geography ==
Nallamilli is located at 16.6032°N 82.0084°E.

== Demographics ==
As of the 2011 India census, Nallamilli had a population of 1996, out of which 1041 were male and 955 were female. The population of children below 6 years of age was 8%. The literacy rate of the village was 74%.
