= Ibrahimpatnam =

- Town
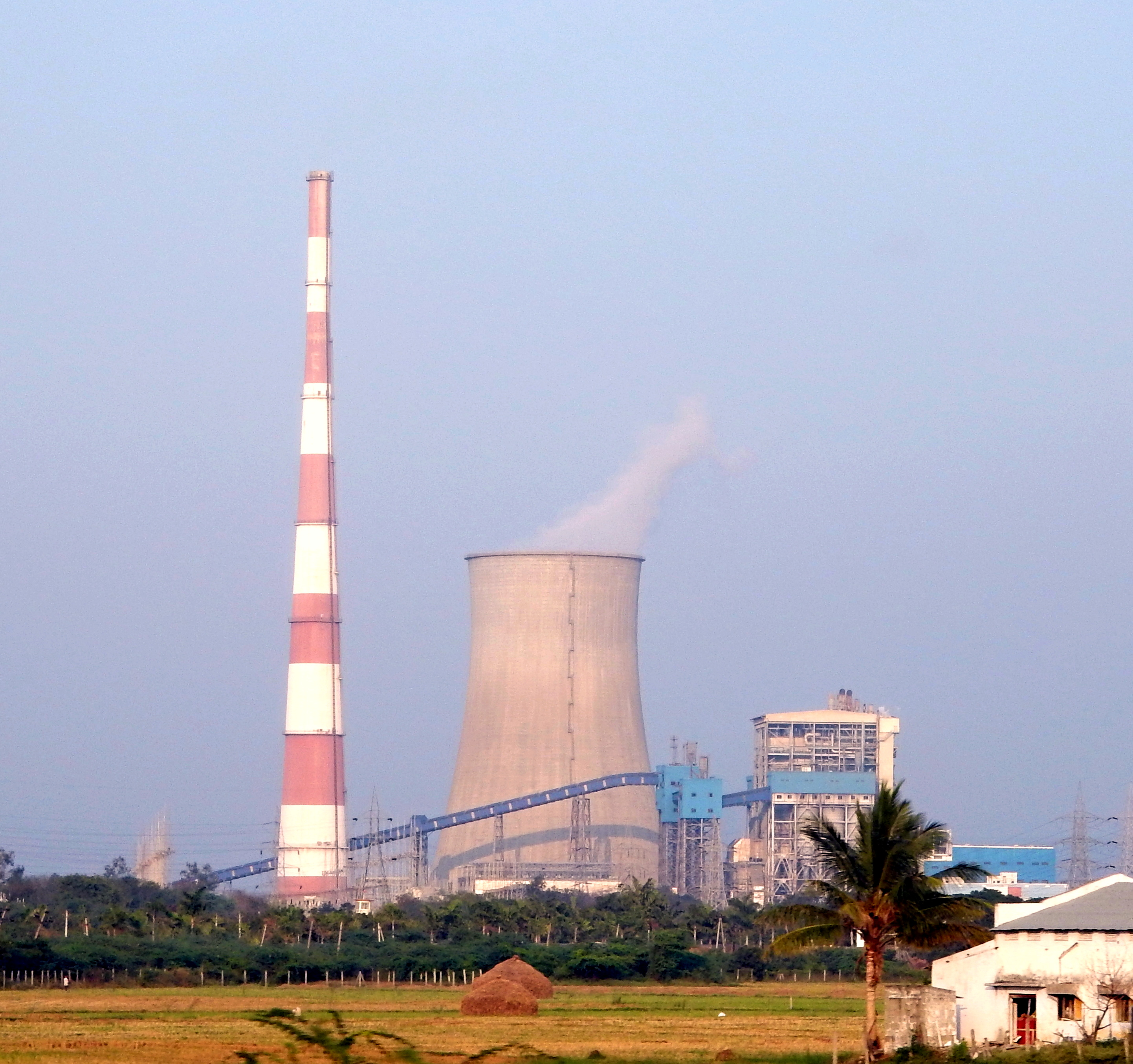
- Vijayawada Thermal Power Station (VTPS), Ibrahimpatnam
- Interactive map of Ibrahimpatnam
- Location within Andhra Pradesh
- Coordinates: 16.5952°N 80.5223°E
- Country: India
- State: Andhra Pradesh
- Region: Coastal Andhra
- District: NTR
- Mandal: Ibrahimpatnam mandal

Area
  - Total: 15.00 km^{2} (5.79 sq mi)
- Elevation: 27 m (89 ft)

Population (2011)
  - Total: 29,432
  - Density: 1,962/km^{2} (5,082/sq mi)
- Time zone: UTC+5:30 (IST)
- PIN: 521456
- Telephone code: +91–866

Ibrahimpatnam is a municipality located in NTR district of the Indian state of Andhra Pradesh. It is also the mandal headquarters of Ibrahimpatnam mandal. The Dr Narla Tata Rao Thermal Power Station, one of the major thermal power stations of the state, is located near the town. The Railway Wagon Workshop at Rayanapadu is also located very near to Ibrahimpatnam at a distance of 4 km.

== Demographics ==
At the 2011 census, the village had a population of 29,432 (13,690 males and 15,742 females: a sex ratio of 1,150 females per 1,000 males). 3,052 children were in the age group of 0–6 years (1,514 are boys and 1,538 are girls; ratio of 1,016 per 1,000). The average literacy rate was 78.37% with 20,673 literates, significantly higher than the state average of 67.41%.

== Transport ==
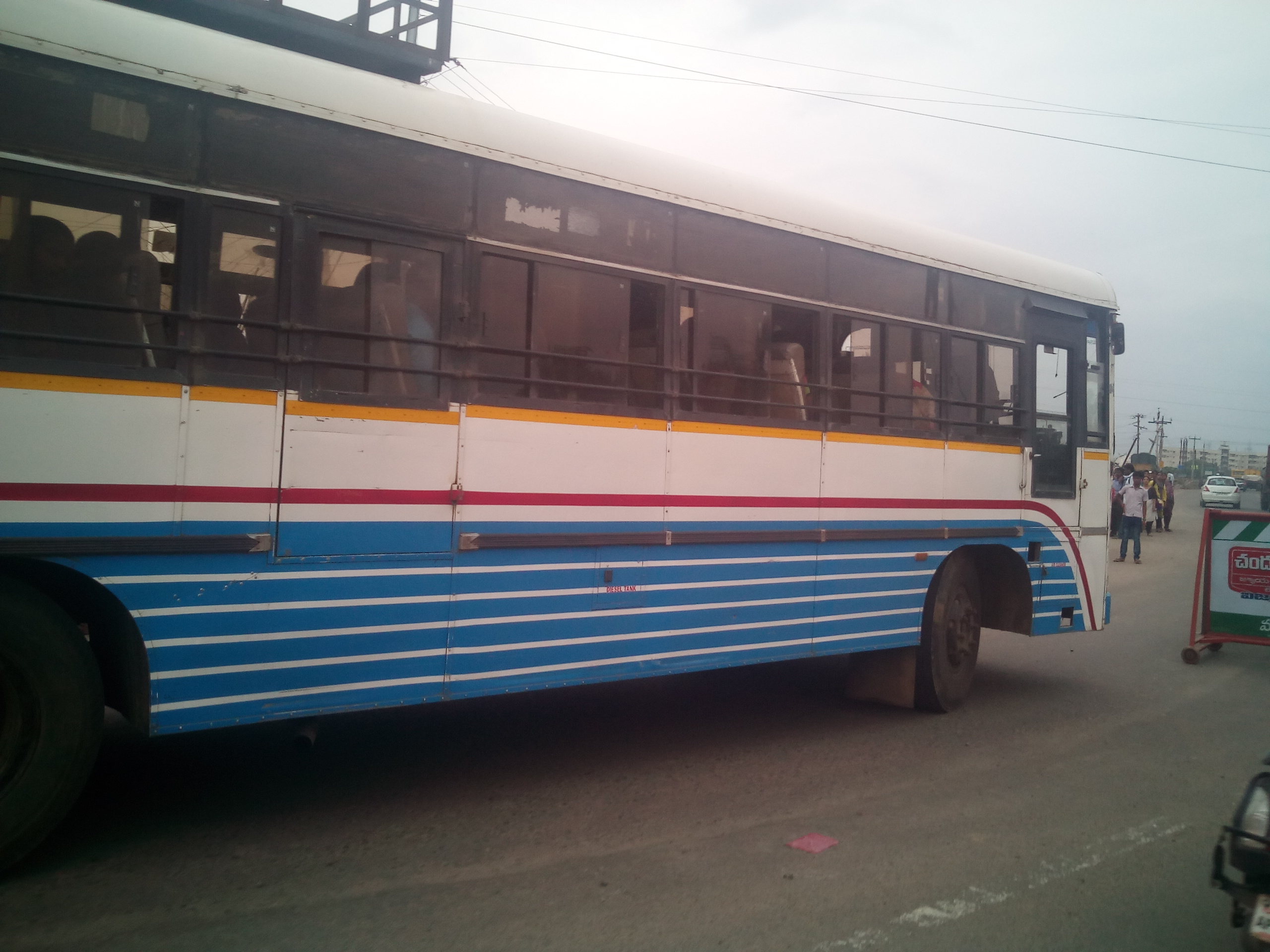
APSRTC bus at Ibrahimpatnam bus stop

Kondapalli Railway Station is the nearest station to the town, located at a distance of 6 kilometres (3.7 mi) on Kazipet–Vijayawada section. It is under the administration of the Vijayawada railway division of South Central Railway zone. NH 65 passes through the town, which connects Vijayawada and Hyderabad. APSRTC operates city buses from Ibrahimpatnam to various parts of the city. APSRTC City Bus Routes

Route number	Start	End	Via
1k	Ibrahimpatnam	Kankipadu	Gollapuri, City Terminal, Governorpet, M.G Road, Libbipet, Benz circle, Patamata, Poranki, Ganur
144	Kondapalli	Auto Nagar	Ibrahimpatam, Gollapuri, City Terminal, Governorpet, M.G Road, Libbipet, Benz circle, Patamata
145	Kondapalli	Nidamanuru	Ibrahimpatnam, Gollapuri, City Terminal, Maruthinagar, gunadala, Ramavarapadu, Nidamanuru,
145G	Kondapalli Railway Station	Gannavaram	Kondapalli Railway Station, City Terminal, Gunadala, Ramavarapadu, Prasadampadu, Enkepadu, Nidamanuru, Kesarapalli, Gannavaram
150	Kondapalli	Kankipadu	Ibrahimpatam, Gollapuri, City Terminal, Governorpet, M.G Road, Libbipet, Benz circle, Patamata, Tadigadapa, Penamaluru
188	Kondapalli Railway Station	Gannavaram	Kondapalli Railway Station, Ibrahim patnam, City Terminal, Gunadala, Ramavarappadu, Gannavaram Centre Bus Stop
200	Kondapalli Khilla	City Terminal	Kondapalli Railway Station, Ibrahim patnam, City Terminal

== Education ==
Primary and secondary school education are provideded by government, aided and private schools, under the School Education Department of the state. The medium of instruction in schools is English and Telugu.

== See also ==
- List of census towns in Andhra Pradesh
