= Bandarulanka =

- Census town
- Location in Andhra Pradesh, India
- Coordinates: 16.5864890°N 81.9679709°E
- Country: India
- State: Andhra Pradesh
- District: Dr. B.R. Ambedkar Konaseema

Area
  - Total: 4.97 km^{2} (1.92 sq mi)

Population (2011)
  - Total: 11,470
  - Density: 2,310/km^{2} (5,980/sq mi)

Languages
  - Official: Telugu
- Time zone: UTC+5:30 (IST)
- Vehicle registration: AP

Bandarulanka is a census town in Amalapuram Mandal, Dr. B.R. Ambedkar Konaseema district of the Indian state of Andhra Pradesh.

== Demographics ==
As of 2011 census of India, Bandarulanka had a population of 11,470 with 3,256 households. The total population constitute, 5,740 males and 5,730 females —a sex ratio of 998 females per 1000 males. 988 children are in the age group of 0–6 years, of which 523 are boys and 465 are girls, —a ratio of 889 per 1000. The average literacy rate stands at 83.40% with 8,742 literates, significantly higher than the state average of 67.41%.

== Education ==
The primary and secondary school education is imparted by government, aided and private schools, under the School Education Department of the state. The medium of instruction followed by different schools are English, Telugu.

== See also ==
- List of census towns in Andhra Pradesh
