= Penamaluru mandal =

- Mandal
- Interactive Map Outlining mandal
- Location in Andhra Pradesh, India
- Coordinates: 16°28′05″N 80°43′10″E
- Country: India
- State: Andhra Pradesh
- District: Krishna
- City/Metro: Vijayawada
- Headquarters: Penamaluru

Area
  - Total: 80.99 km^{2} (31.27 sq mi)

Population (2011)
  - Total: 168,022
  - Density: 2,075/km^{2} (5,373/sq mi)

Languages
  - Official: Telugu
- Time zone: UTC+5:30 (IST)
- Vehicle registration: AP

Penamaluru mandal is one of the 25 mandals in Krishna district of the Indian state of Andhra Pradesh. Penamaluru Mandal is the major suburb of Vijayawada.It is under the administration of Vuyyuru revenue division and its headquarters are located at Penamaluru. The mandal lies on the banks of Krishna River and is bounded by Vijayawada (urban), Vijayawada (rural) and Kankipadu mandals. The mandal is also a part of the Andhra Pradesh Capital Region under the jurisdiction of APCRDA.

== Demographics ==
As of 2011 census, the mandal had a population of 168,022. The total population constitute, 84,485 males and 83,537 females —a sex ratio of 989 females per 1000 males. 15,682 children are in the age group of 0–6 years, of which 7,970 are boys and 7,712 are girls. The average literacy rate stands at 80.39% with 122,471 literates.

== Administration ==
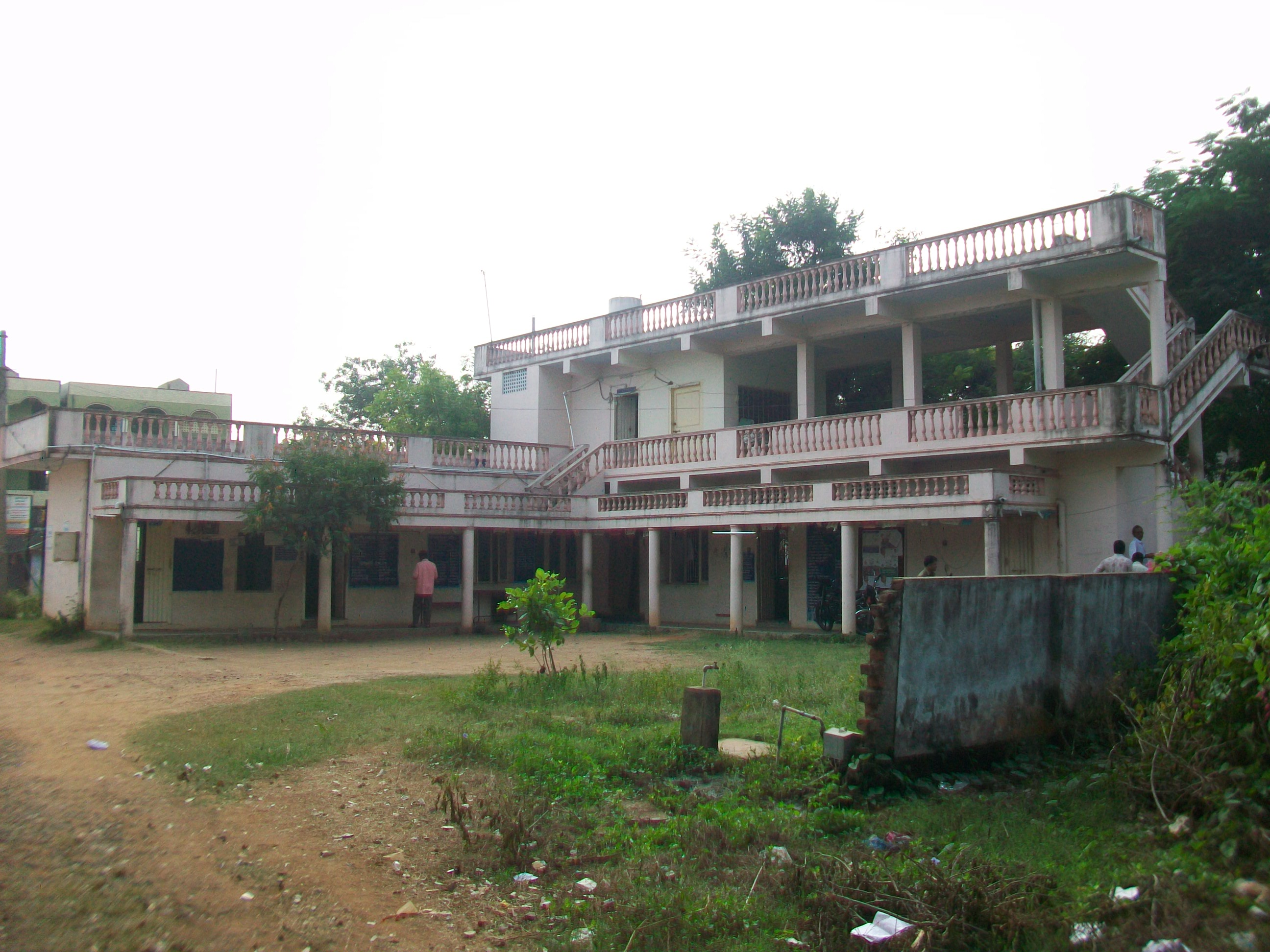
Penamaluru MRO office

The mandal has 10 settlements. It includes 1 out growths and 4 villages. Ganguru (OG) and Penamaluru (OG) are outgrowths to Vijayawada (M.Corp). On 23 March 2017, as per the G.O. 104 of Municipal Administration and Urban Development Department, Kanuru (CT), Poranki (CT), Penamaluru (OG), Tadigadapa (CT), Yanamalakuduru (CT) became a part of Vijayawada metropolitan area.

The following are towns and villages in the mandal:

1. Chodavaram
2. Ganguru (OG)
3. Gosala
4. Pedapulipaka
5. Vanukuru

Note: M.Corp.-Municipal Corporation, (CT)-Census town, OG-Out Growth

== See also ==
- List of villages in Krishna district
- Vijayawada revenue division
