= Kethanakonda =

- Village
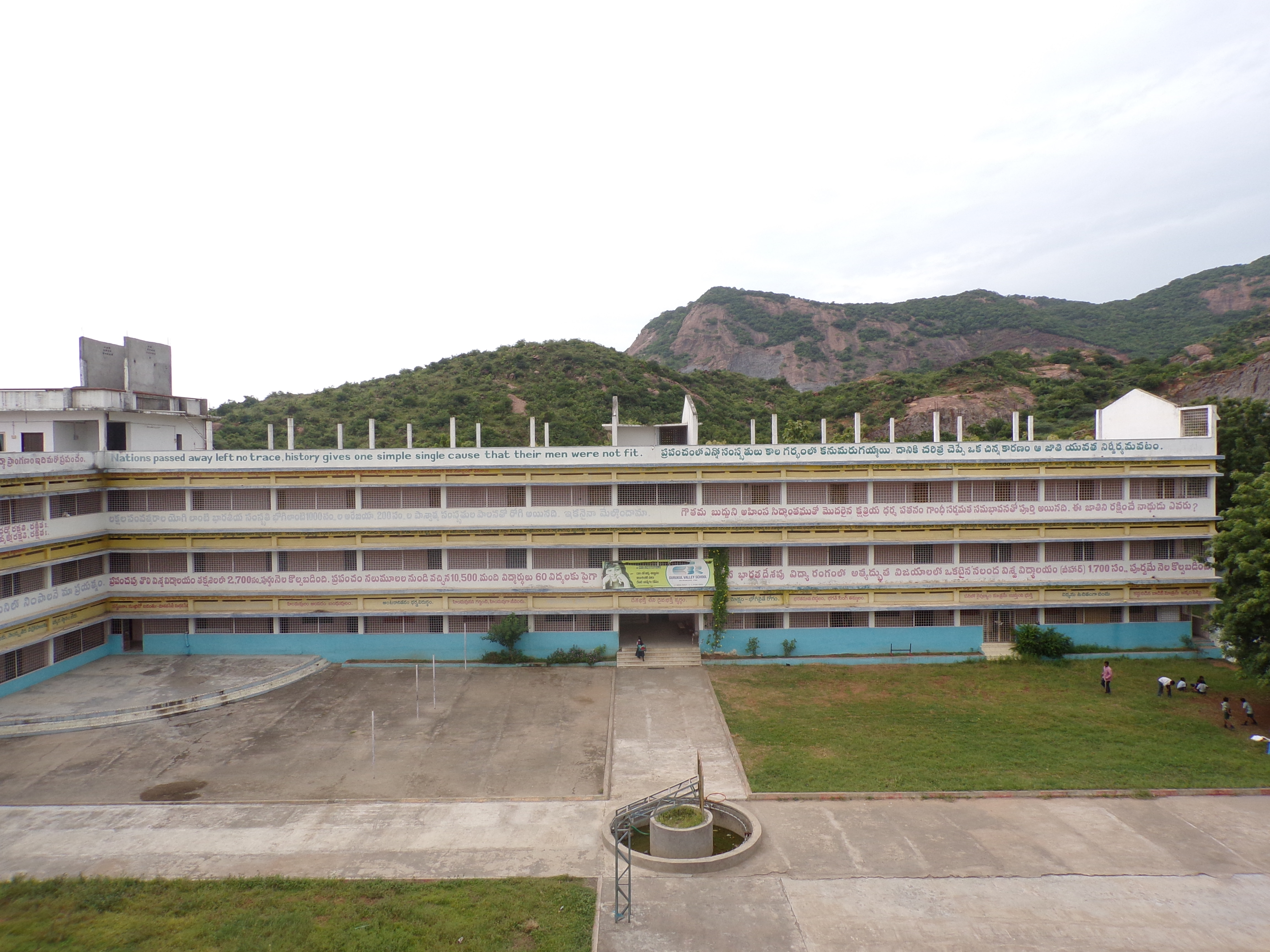
- CBR Sports School
- Interactive map of Kethanakonda
- Location in Andhra Pradesh, India
- Coordinates: 16.6250°N 80.4520°E
- Country: India
- State: Andhra Pradesh
- District: NTR

Area
  - Total: 2.46 km^{2} (0.95 sq mi)

Population (2011)
  - Total: 5,170
  - Density: 2,100/km^{2} (5,440/sq mi)

Languages
  - Official: Telugu
- Time zone: UTC+5:30 (IST)
- Postal code: 521456
- Telephone code: +91-8659
- Vehicle registration: AP-16

Kethanakonda is a suburb of Vijayawada in NTR of the Indian state of Andhra Pradesh. It is located in Ibrahimpatnam mandal under Vijayawada revenue division.
