= Damuluru =

- Village
- Interactive map of Damuluru
- Location in Andhra Pradesh, India Damuluru (India)
- Coordinates: 16.6046765°N 80.4127081°E
- Country: India
- State: Andhra Pradesh
- District: NTR

Area
  - Total: 10.29 km^{2} (3.97 sq mi)

Population (2011)
  - Total: 2,112
  - Density: 205.2/km^{2} (531.6/sq mi)

Languages
  - Official: Telugu
- Time zone: UTC+5:30 (IST)

Damuluru is a village in NTR district of the Indian state of Andhra Pradesh. It is located in Ibrahimpatnam mandal under Vijayawada revenue division.
