= Elaprolu =

- Village
- Interactive map of Elaprolu
- Location in Andhra Pradesh, India Elaprolu (India)
- Coordinates: 16.602032°N 80.558797°E
- Country: India
- State: Andhra Pradesh
- District: NTR

Area
  - Total: 6.77 km^{2} (2.61 sq mi)

Population (2011)
  - Total: 2,076
  - Density: 307/km^{2} (794/sq mi)

Languages
  - Official: Telugu
- Time zone: UTC+5:30 (IST)
- PIN: 521228
- Telephone code: +91–866
- Vehicle registration: AP–16
- Lok Sabha: Vijayawada
- Assembly constituency: Mylavaram

Elaprolu is a village in NTR district of the Indian state of Andhra Pradesh. It is located in Ibrahimpatnam mandal of Vijayawada revenue division.
