= Sakuru, Amalapuram Mandal =

Sakuru
- village
- Interactive map of Sakuru
- Location in Andhra Pradesh, India Sakuru (India)
- Coordinates: 16.5699°N 81.9651°E
- Country: India
- State: Andhra Pradesh
- District: Dr. B.R. Ambedkar Konaseema

Area
  - Total: 1.68 km^{2} (0.65 sq mi)

Population (2011)
  - Total: 1,682
  - Density: 1,001/km^{2} (2,590/sq mi)

Languages
  - Official: Telugu
- Time zone: UTC+5:30 (IST)
- Postal code: 533 446

Sakuru is a village in Amalapuram Mandal, Dr. B.R. Ambedkar Konaseema district in the state of Andhra Pradesh in India.

== Geography ==
Sakuru is located at 16.5699°N 81.9651°E.

== Demographics ==
As of 2011 India census, Sakuru had a population of 1682, out of which 875 were male and 807 were female. The population of children below 6 years of age was 11%. The literacy rate of the village was 82%.
