= Samanasa =

- Village
- Interactive map of Samanasa
- Location in Andhra Pradesh, India
- Coordinates: 16.570863°N 82.047869°E
- Country: India
- State: Andhra Pradesh
- District: Dr. B.R. Ambedkar Konaseema
- Revenue Division: Amalapuram

Languages
  - Official: Telugu
- Time zone: UTC+5:30 (IST)
- PIN: 533213

Samanasa is a village situated in Dr. B.R. Ambedkar Konaseema district in Amalapuram Mandal, in Andhra Pradesh State in India.
