= Ramanayyapeta =

- Census Town
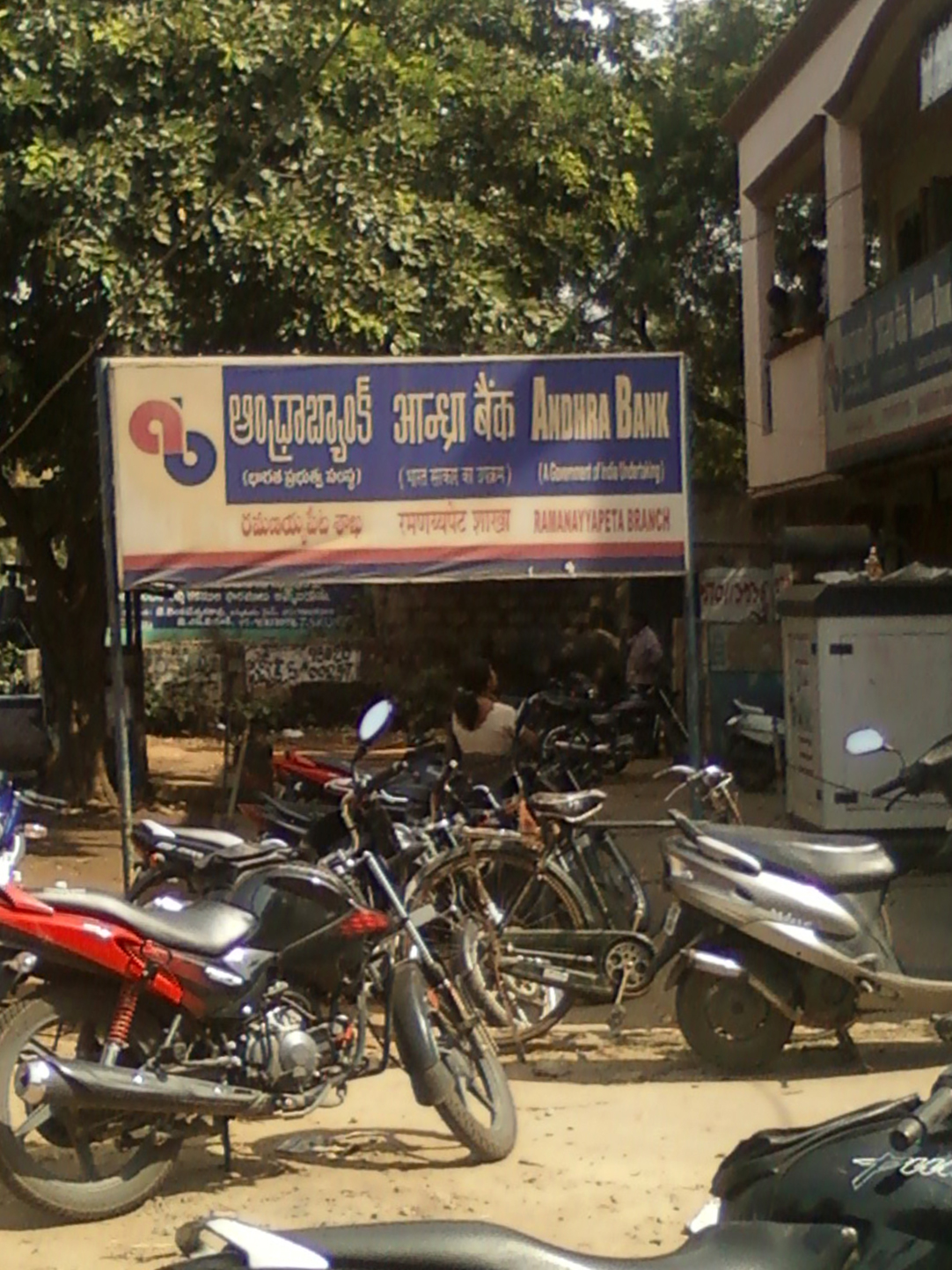
- Ramanayyapeta

- Location in Andhra Pradesh, India
- Coordinates: 17°19′13″N 82°06′05″E
- Country: India
- State: Andhra Pradesh
- District: Kakinada

Area
  - Total: 9.99 km^{2} (3.86 sq mi)

Population (2011)
  - Total: 28,369
  - Density: 2,840/km^{2} (7,350/sq mi)

Languages
  - Official: Telugu
- Time zone: UTC+5:30 (IST)
- Vehicle registration: AP

Ramanayyapeta is a census town in Kakinada district of the Indian state of Andhra Pradesh. It is located in Kakinada (rural) mandal of Kakinada revenue division. The town is a constituent of Kakinada urban agglomeration.

== Demographics ==
As of 2001 India census, Ramanayyapeta had a population of 22,323. Males constitute 51% of the population and females 49%. Ramanayyapeta has an average literacy rate of 75%, higher than the national average of 59.5%: male literacy is 79%, and female literacy is 71%. In Ramanayyapeta, 11% of the population is under 6 years of age.

== Education ==
The primary and secondary school education is imparted by government, aided and private schools, under the School Education Department of the state. The medium of instruction followed by different schools are English, Telugu.

== See also ==
- List of census towns in Andhra Pradesh
