= Palagummi, Amalapuram Mandal =

Palagummi
- village
- Interactive map of Palagummi
- Location in Andhra Pradesh, India Palagummi (India)
- Coordinates: 16.6186°N 81.9758°E
- Country: India
- State: Andhra Pradesh
- District: Dr. B.R. Ambedkar Konaseema

Area
  - Total: 2.1 km^{2} (0.81 sq mi)

Population (2011)
  - Total: 2,369
  - Density: 1,128/km^{2} (2,920/sq mi)

Languages
  - Official: Telugu
- Time zone: UTC+5:30 (IST)
- Postal code: 533 446

Palagummi is a village in Amalapuram Mandal, Dr. B.R. Ambedkar Konaseema district in the state of Andhra Pradesh in India.

== Geography ==
Palagummi is located at 16.6186°N 81.9758°E.

== Demographics ==
As of 2011 India census, Palagummi had a population of 2369, out of which 1166 were male and 1203 were female. The population of children below 6 years of age was 8%. The literacy rate of the village was 82%.
