= Indupalle =

- village
- Interactive map of Indupalle
- Location in Andhra Pradesh, India Indupalle (India)
- Coordinates: 16.5804°N 81.9757°E
- Country: India
- State: Andhra Pradesh
- District: Dr. B.R. Ambedkar Konaseema

Area
  - Total: 5.92 km^{2} (2.29 sq mi)

Population (2011)
  - Total: 5,744
  - Density: 970/km^{2} (2,500/sq mi)

Languages
  - Official: Telugu
- Time zone: UTC+5:30 (IST)
- Postal code: 533 446

Indupalle is a village in Amalapuram Mandal, Dr. B.R. Ambedkar Konaseema district in the state of Andhra Pradesh in India.

== Geography ==
Indupalle is located at 16.5804°N 81.9757°E.

== Demographics ==
As of 2011 India census, Indupalle had a population of 5744, out of which 2902 were male and 2842 were female. The population of children below 6 years of age was 10%. The literacy rate of the village was 78%.
