= Nadipudi, Amalapuram Mandal =

Village in Andhra Pradesh, India

Nadipudi
- village
- Interactive map of Nadipudi
- Location in Andhra Pradesh, India Nadipudi (India)
- Coordinates: 16.6063°N 81.9848°E
- Country: India
- State: Andhra Pradesh
- District: Dr. B.R. Ambedkar Konaseema

Area
  - Total: 2.04 km^{2} (0.79 sq mi)

Population (2011)
  - Total: 3,042
  - Density: 1,491/km^{2} (3,860/sq mi)

Languages
  - Official: Telugu
- Time zone: UTC+5:30 (IST)
- Postal code: 533 446

Nadipudi is a village in Amalapuram Mandal, Dr. B.R. Ambedkar Konaseema district in the state of Andhra Pradesh in India.

== Geography ==
Nadipudi is located at 16.6063°N 81.9848°E.

== Demographics ==
As of 2011 India census, Nadipudi had a population of 3042, out of which 1558 were male and 1484 were female. The population of children below 6 years of age was 9%. The literacy rate of the village was 86%.
