= Ferro Alloys Corporation =

Indian ferromanganese producer

The Ferro Alloys Corporation Limited
- Type: Public
- Traded as: BSE: 532657 NSE: FERROALLOY
- Industry: Ferros metal
- Founded: 1956; 70 years ago
- Founder: Sreeman Seth Durgaprasadji Saraf
- Headquarters: Nagpur, Maharashtra, India
- Area served: South Asia-China, Japan, Korea, Indonesia & Taiwan, Europe- Netherlands, Germany, Italy, United States and Canada
- Key people: R K Saraf, Director & MD

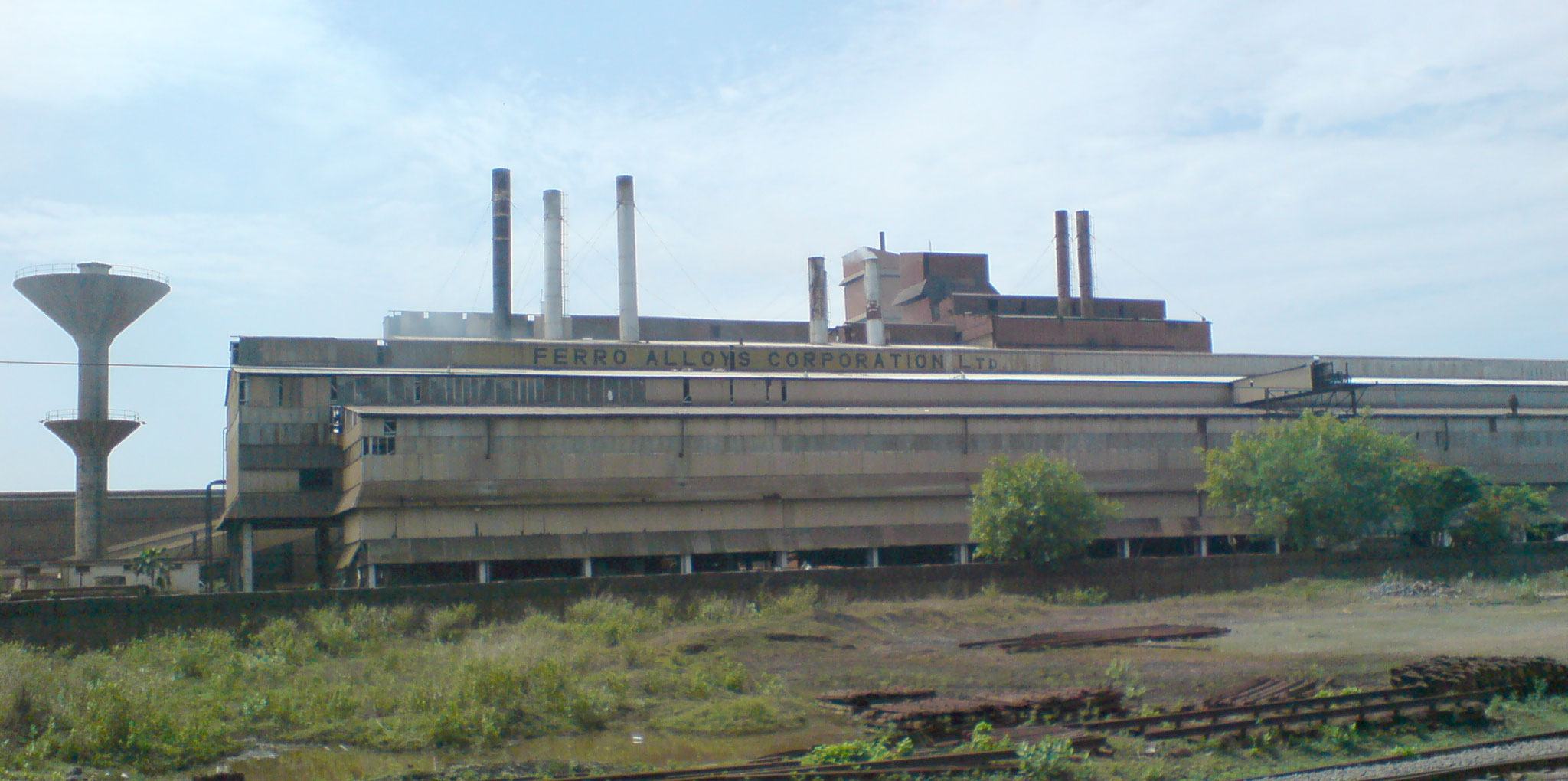
FACOR, Sriramnagar

The Ferro Alloys Corporation Limited (FACOR) was floated in 1955 by the house of Sarafs and Mors to become the first major producer of ferromanganese in India.

== History ==
The year 1956, marked the beginning of the Ferro Alloys Corporation Limited at Sriramnagar, Garividi, Vizianagaram district, Andhra Pradesh. The founder was Seth Shriman Durgaprasadji Saraf (1911–1988). The registered office is at Tumsar, Bhandara district, Maharashtra.

Ferroalloys are used as deoxidizers and alloy additives in the steel manufacturing process.

The ferromanganese plant started production in 1957, equipped with three furnaces for production of high carbon ferromanganese and ferrosilicon. In 1969, a reduction furnace and a slag furnace were commissioned for the production of ferrochrome. The company independently, set up a 16 MVA furnace in 1981.

FACOR acquired a small steel plant at Nagpur in Maharashtra. In 1979, FACOR developed the technology to produce charge chrome in their own R&D wing. They have established a charge chrome plant at D.P.Nagar, Randia in Bhadrak district of Odisha in 1983. It is a 100% Export Oriented Project with a production capacity of 50,000 tons per annum. FACOR signed an agreement with Marc Rich and Co. AG Switzerland, as the sole selling agent of their entire charge chrome output for 10 years.

The plants at Sriramnagar have facilities for raw material handling, metal, and slag casting, crushing, sizing and other ancillaries apart from furnaces for the smelting of ferroalloys. The raw materials are manganese ore, chromite and quartzite ores with principal elements of manganese, chromium and silicon respectively. They are obtained from the Andhra Pradesh, Odisha, Madhya Pradesh and Bihar states. The Ferro Alloys produced are High Carbon Ferro Chrome, Low Carbon Ferro Chrome, Silicochrome, Silicomanganese, and Magnesium Ferrosilicon, Ferromanganese etc., These alloys are tapped from electric arc furnaces in the molten state. They are prepared to the required size from 25 mm to 150 mm and transported to the various steel companies. The furnaces are connected to Two-stage venturi scrubber systems to maintain a clean environment in and around the production area.

FACOR has been accredited under ISO 9001:2000.

The existing manpower at Sriramnagar is about 784 regular employees with 107 supervisory personnel, besides 1070 contract workmen.

In 2003, the charge chrome division along with the mining division in Odisha has been demerged as FACOR STEELS Ltd and the Ferro Alloys division at Garividi as FACOR ALLOYS Ltd.

One of FACOR's group company FACOR Power had defaulted in their payment to Rural Eletricifcation Corporation (REC) and as a result of which REC had initiated CIRP proceedings against FACOR. FACOR had reportedly provided a Corporate Guarantee on behalf of FACOR Power. Through the NCLT Route, FACOR was acquired by the Vedanta Group in 2020. As of date, Ferro Alloys Corporation Limited (FACOR) is a part of the Vedanta Group.
