= Yenamalakuduru =

- Neighbourhood
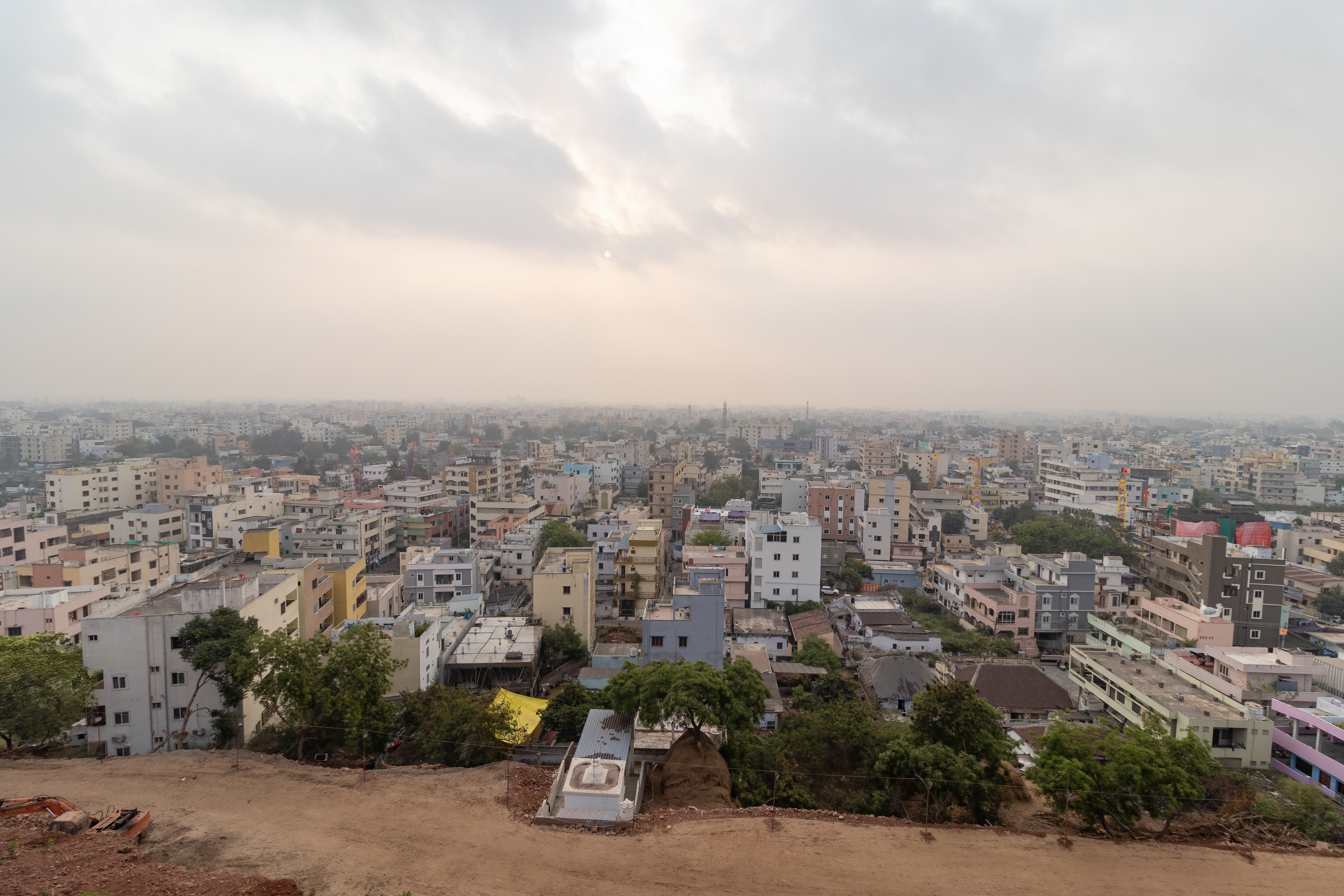
- Aerial view of the town

- Location in Andhra Pradesh, India Yenamalakuduru (India)
- Country: India
- State: Andhra Pradesh
- District: Krishna
- Mandal: Penamaluru
- City: Vijayawada
- Metro: Andhra Pradesh Capital Region

Area
  - Total: 4.17 km^{2} (1.61 sq mi)

Population (2011)
  - Total: 34,177
  - Density: 8,200/km^{2} (21,200/sq mi)

Languages
  - Official: Telugu
- Time zone: UTC+5:30 (IST)
- Postal code: 520007
- Vehicle registration: AP 16
- Assembly constituency: Penamaluru
- Lok Sabha constituency: Machilipatnam

Yanamalakuduru is a neighbourhood in Vijayawada. It is a census town in Krishna district of the Indian state of Andhra Pradesh. It is located in Penamaluru mandal. As per the G.O. No. M.S.104 (dated:23-03-2017), Municipal Administration and Urban Development Department, it became a part of Vijayawada metropolitan area.

== Education ==
The primary and secondary school education is provided by government, aid and development groups, and private schools, under the School Education Department of the state. English and Telugu are the main languages of instruction.

== See also ==
- List of census towns in Andhra Pradesh
