= Tummalapalem =

- Village
- Interactive map of Tummalapalem
- Location in Andhra Pradesh, India Tummalapalem (India)
- Coordinates: 16.5715°N 80.5307°E
- Country: India
- State: Andhra Pradesh
- District: NTR
- Mandal: Ibrahimpatnam
- City: Vijayawada
- Metro: Andhra Pradesh Capital Region

Area
  - Total: 2.18 km^{2} (0.84 sq mi)

Population (2015)
  - Total: 2,698
  - Density: 1,240/km^{2} (3,210/sq mi)

Languages
  - Official: Telugu
- Time zone: UTC+5:30 (IST)
- Telephone code: 521241

Tummalapalem is located in western part of Vijayawada in the Indian state of Andhra Pradesh. It is a village falls under Ibrahimpatnam mandal in Vijayawada revenue division of NTR district. There is a proposal to merge this village into Vijayawada Municipal Corporation (VMC) to form a Greater Vijayawada Municipal Corporation.
