= Amalapuram mandal =

- Mandal
- Interactive map of Amalapuram mandal
- Country: India
- State: Andhra Pradesh
- District: Dr. B.R. Ambedkar Konaseema
- Population according to 2011 Census: 1,41,693
- Number of Villages: 17
- Area in Sq Km: 80.6
- Time zone: UTC+5:30 (IST)

Amalapuram mandal is one of the 22 mandals in Dr. B.R. Ambedkar Konaseema district of Andhra Pradesh, India. According to the 2011 census, there are 17 villages in this mandal.

== Demographics ==
Amalapuram mandal has total population of 1,41,693 as per the 2011 Census out of which 71,098 of inhabitants are male while 70,595 are female. The average sex ratio is 993. The total literacy rate is 84%.

== Towns and villages ==
=== Villages and Towns ===
- A. Vemavaram
- Amalapuram town
- Bandarulanka town
- Bhatnavilli
- Edarapalle
- Gunnapalle Agraharam
- Immidivarappadu
- Indupalle
- Janupalle
- Nadipudi
- Nallamilli
- Palagummi
- Peruru
- Sakuru
- Samanasa
- Thandavapalle
- Vanne Chintalapudi

== See also ==
- List of mandals in Andhra Pradesh
