= Thandavapalli =

- village
- Interactive map of Thandavapalli
- Location in Andhra Pradesh, India Thandavapalli (India)
- Coordinates: 16.5440°N 81.0428°E
- Country: India
- State: Andhra Pradesh
- District: Dr. B.R. Ambedkar Konaseema

Area
  - Total: 2.88 km^{2} (1.11 sq mi)

Population (2011)
  - Total: 1,959
  - Density: 680/km^{2} (1,800/sq mi)

Languages
  - Official: Telugu
- Time zone: UTC+5:30 (IST)
- Postal code: 533 446

Thandavapalli is a village in Amalapuram Mandal, Dr. B.R. Ambedkar Konaseema district in the state of Andhra Pradesh in India.

In September 2005, an ONGC exploratory well in Thandavapalli, near Amalapuram in the Krishna–Godavari basin experienced a high‑pressure blow‑out and fire on September 8. Flames reportedly rose over 150 ft and the resulting inferno burned for several days, prompting the evacuation of nearby villages. Although no casualties were officially confirmed, seven ONGC personnel were initially reported missing, with concerns raised regarding well control practices and emergency response timings. The incident prompted public and governmental scrutiny of ONGC’s safety protocols in the Cauvery delta region and intensified debate over environmental and regulatory practices in the basin.

== Education ==
Thandavapalli has a government-run Mandal Parishad Upper Primary School (MPUPS), established in 1913 as primary school (upgraded to upper primary in 1993), serving students from classes 1 to 8. As a rural, co-educational government school, it offers basic facilities including drinking water, toilets, and a library, and shares school updates on its official Facebook page.

== Geography ==
Thandavapalli is located at 16.5440°N 81.0428°E.

== Demographics ==
As of 2011 India census, Thandavapalli had a population of 1959, out of which 985 were male and 974 were female. The population of children below 6 years of age was 10%. The literacy rate of the village was 81%.
