= Bhatnavilli =

- Village
- Interactive map of Bhatnavilli
- Location in Andhra Pradesh, India
- Coordinates: 16.598776°N 82.041781°E
- Country: India
- State: Andhra Pradesh
- District: Dr. B.R. Ambedkar Konaseema

Population (2011)
  - Total: 4,591

Languages
  - Official: Telugu
- Time zone: UTC+5:30 (IST)
- PIN: 533 222
- Vehicle registration: AP

Bhatnavilli is a village in the Amalapuram Mandal of Dr. B.R. Ambedkar Konaseema district in the State of Andhra Pradesh, India. The village is located by the national highway 216 which is now being expanded to a six lane highway. Amalapuram railway station is being proposed to be located here.

== Demographics ==
Bhatnavilli village has a population of 4591 of which 2269 are males while 2322 are females as per Population Census 2011. Bhatnavilli village has higher literacy rate compared to Andhra Pradesh. In 2011, literacy rate of Bhatnavilli village was 81.19% compared to 67.02% of Andhra Pradesh. In Bhatnavilli Male literacy stands at 85.37% while female literacy rate was 78.10%.

== Education ==
Government school is available in the village which was started in the year 1937. But most of the people prefer sending their children to bigger schools in Amalapuram due to its proximity. Several educational institutions are near to the village on either sides (such as KIMS (Konaseema Institute of Medical Sciences), Srinivasa Engineering college, Prasiddha College of Engineering and Technology etc..)

== Attractions ==
Sakaleshwara swamy (Lord Shiva) and Madhanagopala swamy (Lord Vishnu) temples are two famous temples boasting 150 years of History. Kanakadurga Devi temple is another famous temple visited mostly by the people of nearby villages.
