= Janupalle =

- village
- Interactive map of Janupalle
- Location in Andhra Pradesh, India Janupalle (India)
- Coordinates: 16.5982°N 82.0074°E
- Country: India
- State: Andhra Pradesh
- District: Dr. B.R. Ambedkar Konaseema

Area
  - Total: 1.65 km^{2} (0.64 sq mi)

Population (2011)
  - Total: 3,836
  - Density: 2,325/km^{2} (6,020/sq mi)

Languages
  - Official: Telugu
- Time zone: UTC+5:30 (IST)
- Postal code: 533 446

Janupalle is a village in Amalapuram Mandal, Dr. B.R. Ambedkar Konaseema district in the state of Andhra Pradesh in India.

== Geography ==
Janupalle is located at 16.5982°N 82.0074°E.

== Demographics ==
As of 2011 India census, Janupalle had a population of 3836, out of which 1841 were male and 1995 were female. The population of children below 6 years of age was 9%. The literacy rate of the village was 80%.
