= Ganguru =

- Neighbourhood
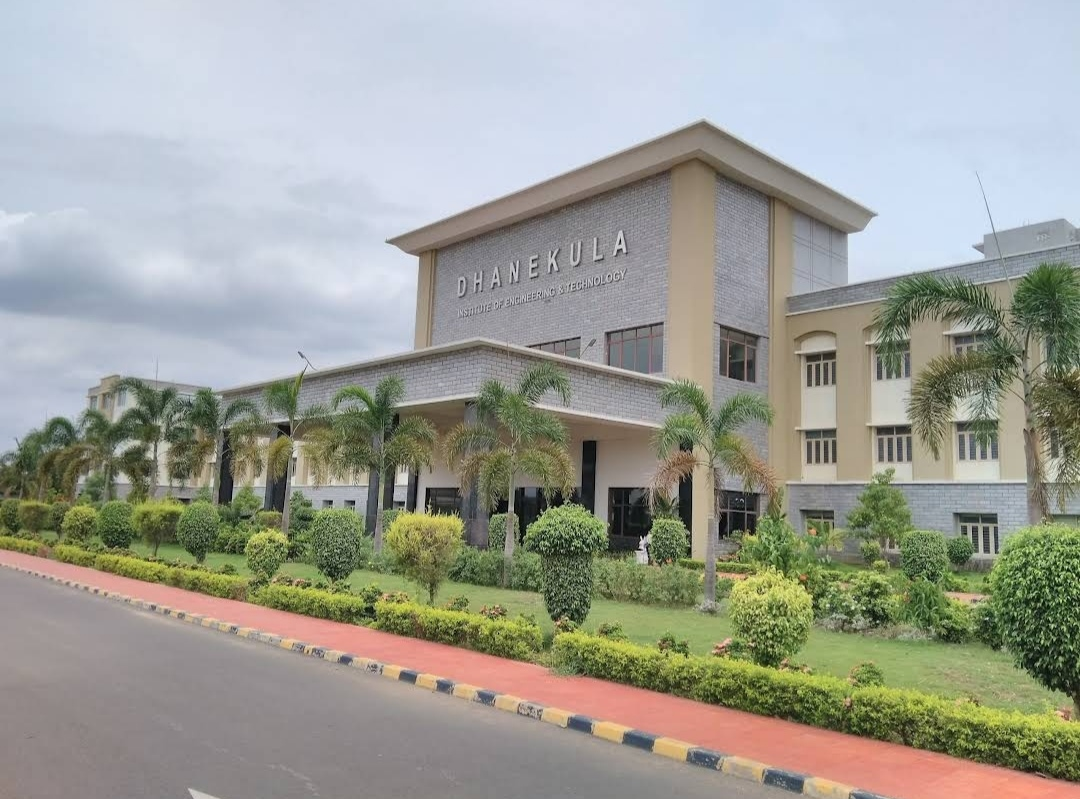
- Danekula College

- Location in Andhra Pradesh, India Ganguru (India)
- Coordinates: 16°28′30″N 80°44′28″E
- Country: India
- State: Andhra Pradesh
- District: Krishna
- Mandal: Penamaluru

Population (2011)
  - Total: 9,757

Languages
  - Official: Telugu
- Time zone: UTC+5:30 (IST)
- Vehicle registration: AP
- Lok Sabha constituency: Machilipatnam

Ganguru is a neighbourhood of Vijayawada in Krishna district of the Indian state of Andhra Pradesh. As per the G.O. No. M.S.104 (dated:23-03-2017), Municipal Administration and Urban Development Department, it became a part of Vijayawada metropolitan area. It is located in Penamaluru mandal
