= Immidivarappadu =

Village in Andhra Pradesh, India

- village
- Interactive map of Immidivarappadu
- Location in Andhra Pradesh, India Immidivarappadu (India)
- Coordinates: 16.5473°N 81.0190°E
- Country: India
- State: Andhra Pradesh
- District: Dr. B.R. Ambedkar Konaseema

Area
  - Total: 1.36 km^{2} (0.53 sq mi)

Population (2011)
  - Total: 1,151
  - Density: 846/km^{2} (2,190/sq mi)

Languages
  - Official: Telugu
- Time zone: UTC+5:30 (IST)
- Postal code: 533 446

Immidivarappadu is a village in Amalapuram Mandal, Dr. B.R. Ambedkar Konaseema district in the state of Andhra Pradesh in India.

== Geography ==
Immidivarappadu is located at 16.5473°N 81.0190°E.

== Demographics ==
As of 2011 India census, Immidivarappadu had a population of 1151, out of which 577 were male and 574 were female. The population of children below 6 years of age was 10%. The literacy rate of the village was 83%.
