= Poranki =

- Neighbourhood
- Location in Andhra Pradesh, India
- Coordinates: 16°28′27.52″N 80°42′46.13″E
- Country: India
- State: Andhra Pradesh
- District: Krishna
- Mandal: Penamaluru
- City: Vijayawada
- Metro: Andhra Pradesh Capital Region

Area
  - Total: 11.78 km^{2} (4.55 sq mi)

Population (2011)
  - Total: 25,545
  - Density: 2,169/km^{2} (5,616/sq mi)

Languages
  - Official: Telugu
- Time zone: UTC+5:30 (IST)
- PIN: 521137
- Telephone code: 0866
- Vehicle registration: AP16
- city: Vijayawada
- Literacy: 90%
- Lok Sabha constituency: Machilipatnam
- Vidhan Sabha constituency: Penamaluru

Poranki is a neighbourhood located in Vijayawada, Krishna district of the Indian state of Andhra Pradesh. It is located in Penamaluru mandal of Vijayawada revenue division. As per the G.O. No. M.S.104 (dated:23-03-2017), Municipal Administration and Urban Development Department, it became a part of Vijayawada metropolitan area. It is 2 KM from Penamaluru.

== Education ==
The primary and secondary school education is imparted by government, aided and private schools, under the School Education Department of the state. The medium of instruction followed by different schools are English, Telugu.

== See also ==
- List of census towns in Andhra Pradesh
