= Gunnapalle Agraharam =

- village
- Interactive map of Gunnapalle Agraharam
- Location in Andhra Pradesh, India Gunnapalle Agraharam (India)
- Coordinates: 16.5704°N 81.9610°E
- Country: India
- State: Andhra Pradesh
- District: Dr. B.R. Ambedkar Konaseema

Area
  - Total: 1.79 km^{2} (0.69 sq mi)

Population (2011)
  - Total: 1,963
  - Density: 1,097/km^{2} (2,840/sq mi)

Languages
  - Official: Telugu
- Time zone: UTC+5:30 (IST)
- Postal code: 533 446

Gunnapalle Agraharam is a village in Amalapuram Mandal, Dr. B.R. Ambedkar Konaseema district in the state of Andhra Pradesh in India.

== Geography ==
Gunnapalle Agraharam is located at 16.5704°N 81.9610°E.

== Demographics ==
As of 2011 India census, Gunnapalle Agraharam had a population of 1963, out of which 1011 were male and 952 were female. The population of children below 6 years of age was 11%. The literacy rate of the village was 81%.
