= Guntupalli, NTR district =

Guntupalli
- Census Town
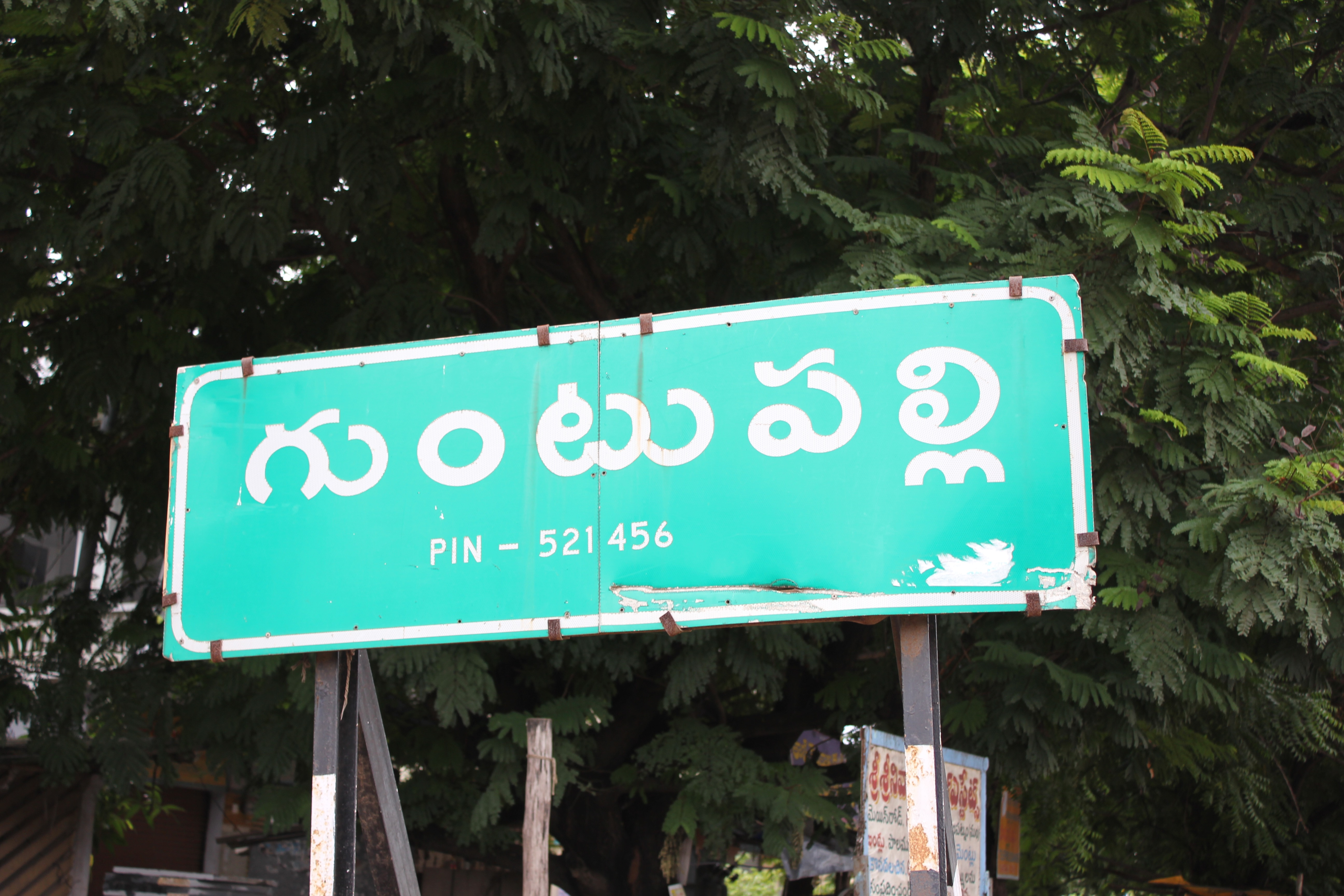
- Guntupalli signboard on National Highway 5
- Interactive map of Guntupalli
- Location within Andhra Pradesh Location within India
- Coordinates: 16.568°N 80.548°E
- Country: India
- State: Andhra Pradesh
- Region: Coastal Andhra
- District: NTR
- Mandal: Ibrahimpatnam
- City: Vijayawada
- Metro: Andhra Pradesh Capital Region

Government
  - Type: Mayor-council
  - Body: Guntupalli Gram panchayat

Area
  - Total: 10.26 km^{2} (3.96 sq mi)

Population (2011)
  - Total: 11,187
  - Density: 1,090/km^{2} (2,824/sq mi)
- Time zone: UTC+5:30 (IST)
- PIN: 521241
- Telephone code: +91-
- Vehicle registration: AP
- Official language: Telugu

Guntupalli is located in western part of Vijayawada in the Indian state of Andhra Pradesh. It is a rural area which falls under Ibrahimpatnam mandal in Vijayawada revenue division of NTR district. Guntupalli Railway Wagon Workshop is located here. There is a proposal to merge this village into Vijayawada Municipal Corporation (VMC) to form a Greater Vijayawada Municipal Corporation.

== Demographics ==
As of 2011 census, the town had a population of 11,187. The total population constitute, 5,573 males and 5,614 females —a sex ratio of 1007 females per 1000 males. 993 children are in the age group of 0–6 years, of which 521 are boys and 472 are girls —a ratio of 906 per 1000. The average literacy rate stands at 85.18% with 8,683 literates, significantly higher than the state average of 67.41%.

Jainism was once practiced and is supported by the Jain remnants at the site.

== Transport ==
APSRTC operates city buses from Vijayawada. Rayanapadu railway station is the nearby railway station to the town. The town is located 10 km to the west of Vijayawada on NH 65. It has the wagon workshop of Indian Railways.

== Education ==
The primary and secondary school education is imparted by government, aided and private schools, under the School Education Department of the state. Several schools and colleges run by Private, Local government, state government and central government.

== See also ==
- List of census towns in Andhra Pradesh
