= Chodavaram, Nallajerla mandal =

Chodavaram
- village
- Interactive map of Chodavaram
- Location in Andhra Pradesh, India
- Coordinates: 16.954813°N 81.453294°E
- Country: India
- State: Andhra Pradesh
- District: East Godavari
- Elevation: 26 m (85 ft)

Languages
  - Official: Telugu
- Time zone: UTC+5:30 (IST)
- PIN: 534111
- Telephone code: 08818272---
- Lok Sabha constituency: Rajahmundry
- Vidhan Sabha constituency: Gopalapuram

Chodavaram, Nallajera Mandal (West) is a village located in Nallajerla Mandal of east Godavari district in Andhra Pradesh, India.

== Demographics ==
As of 2011 Census of India, Chodavaram (West) village has population of 12,412 of which 6,198 are males and 6,214 are females. The population of children between age 0-6 is 1,324 which is 10.67% of total population.

The sex-ratio of Chodavaram (West) village is around 1003 compared to 993 which is average of Andhra Pradesh state. The literacy rate of Chodavaram (West) village is 62% out of which 65.05% males are literate and 58.96% females are literate. There are 21.97% Scheduled Caste (SC) and 0.77% Scheduled Tribe (ST) of total population in Chodavaram (West) village.

=== Chodavaram (West) Population Facts ===
Number of Households	3,666
Population	12,412
Male Population	6,198 (49.94%)
Female Population	6,214 (50.06%)
Children Population	1,324
Sex-ratio	1003
Literacy	62%
Male Literacy	65.05%
Female Literacy	58.96%
Scheduled Tribes (ST) %	0.77%
Scheduled Caste (SC) %	21.97%
