= A. Vemavaram =

- village
- Interactive map of A. Vemavaram
- Location in Andhra Pradesh, India A. Vemavaram (India)
- Coordinates: 16.6098°N 82.0168°E
- Country: India
- State: Andhra Pradesh
- District: Dr. B. R. Ambedkar Konaseema

Population (2011)
  - Total: 3,854

Languages
  - Official: Telugu
- Time zone: UTC+5:30 (IST)
- Postal code: 533 221

A. Vemavaram is a village in Amalapuram Mandal, Dr. B. R. Ambedkar Konaseema district in the state of Andhra Pradesh in India.

== Geography ==
A. Vemavaram is located at 16.6098°N 82.0168°E. It is located on the island between the River Godavari and the Bay of Bengal.

== Demographics ==
As of the Census of 2011, A. Vemavaram has a population of 3,854 of which 1,903 were males while 1,951 were females, sex ratio is 1025. Population of children (age 0–6) was 360 which makes up 9.34% of total population of village. Literacy rate of the village was 79.39%.
