= Kanapaka =

- Census Town
- Location in Andhra Pradesh, India
- Coordinates: 18°06′25″N 83°23′46″E
- Country: India
- State: Andhra Pradesh
- District: Vizianagaram

Population (2001)
  - Total: 6,684

Languages
  - Official: Telugu
- Time zone: UTC+5:30 (IST)
- Vehicle registration: AP

Kanapaka is a census town in Vizianagaram district in the Indian state of Andhra Pradesh.

== Demographics ==
As of 2001 India census, Kanapaka had a population of 6684. Males constitute 51% of the population and females 49%. Kanapaka has an average literacy rate of 70%, higher than the national average of 59.5%: male literacy is 81%, and female literacy is 60%. In Kanapaka, 9% of the population is under 6 years of age.

== Education ==
The primary and secondary school education is imparted by government, aided and private schools, under the School Education Department of the state. The medium of instruction followed by different schools are English, Telugu.
