= Somandepalle =

Town in Anantapuram, Andhra Pradesh

- Census Town
- Location in Andhra Pradesh, India
- Coordinates: 14°00′28″N 77°36′31″E
- Country: India
- State: Andhra Pradesh
- District: Sri Sathya Sai
- Talukas: Somandepalle

Area
  - Total: 30.34 km^{2} (11.71 sq mi)

Population (2011)
  - Total: 18,895
  - Density: 622.8/km^{2} (1,613/sq mi)

Languages
  - Official: Telugu
- Time zone: UTC+5:30 (IST)
- Vehicle registration: AP

Somandepalle is a census town in Sri Sathya Sai district of the Indian state of Andhra Pradesh. It is located in Somandepalle mandal of Penukonda revenue division. The town is a constituent of Anantapur urban agglomeration.

== Demographics ==
According to Indian census, 2001, the demographic details of Somandepalle mandal is as follows:

- Total Population: 40,219 in 8,426 Households
- Male Population: 20,667 and Female Population: 19,552
- Children Under 6-years of age: 5,901 (Boys – 2,960 and Girls – 2,941)
- Total Literates: 17,271

== Education ==
The primary and secondary school education is imparted by government, aided and private schools, under the School Education Department of the state. The medium of instruction followed are English and Telugu.

== See also ==
- List of census towns in Andhra Pradesh
