= Chodavaram, Vijayawada =

Chodavaram Cholavaram
- Neighborhood
- Interactive map of Chodavaram
- Location in Andhra Pradesh, India
- Country: India
- State: Andhra Pradesh
- District: Krishna
- Mandal: Penamaluru
- Constituency: Penamaluru
- City: Vijayawada

Area
  - Total: 16.47 km^{2} (6.36 sq mi)

Population (2016)
  - Total: 3,384
  - Density: 205.5/km^{2} (532.2/sq mi)

Languages
  - Official: Telugu
- Time zone: UTC+5:30 (IST)
- PIN: 521139
- Vehicle registration: AP 16 (old) /AP 39 (New)
- Metro: Vijayawada Metropolitan Region

Chodavaram is a part of Vijayawada in Krishna district of the Indian state of Andhra Pradesh. It is located in Penamaluru mandal of Vijayawada revenue division.

== Demographics ==
It is located at river bank of Krishna.
