= Peruru, Ramagiri =

Village in Andhra Pradesh, India

Coordinates: 16°32′53″N 81°58′46″E

Peruru, also called Perur, is a village located in Ramagiri Mandal, Sri Sathya Sai district in the Indian state of Andhra Pradesh.

The village is located 62 km (39 mi) from district headquarters Anantapur and 422 km (262 mi) from Hyderabad. The local language is Telugu.

== Nearby villages/towns ==
Peruru is surrounded by several villages. Makkinavaripalle lies approximately 4 km to the south, Konetinayanipalyam 5 km to the north, Chennampalle 5.74 km to the west, and Kondapuram 6 km to the south. Kurakulapalle is located approximately 7.56 km to the southwest, Nasanakota 8.26 km to the east, and Ralla Anantapuram 9.40 km to the northwest.

Dharmavaram, approximately 53 km from Perur, is the nearest major town from the village.

== Demographics ==
According to the 2011 census, the population of Peruru is 7,234 across 1,752 households, with 3,652 males and 3,582 female densities.
