= Moragudi =

- Census Town
- Location in Andhra Pradesh, India
- Coordinates: 14°51′45″N 78°22′38″E
- Country: India
- State: Andhra Pradesh
- District: Kadapa

Population (2001)
  - Total: 5,961

Languages
  - Official: Telugu
- Time zone: UTC+5:30 (IST)
- Vehicle registration: AP

Moragudi is a census town in Kadapa district in the Indian state of Andhra Pradesh.

== Demographics ==
As of 2001 India census, Moragudi had a population of 5961. Males constitute 50% of the population and females 50%. Moragudi has an average literacy rate of 55%, lower than the national average of 59.5%: male literacy is 68%, and female literacy is 42%. In Moragudi, 12% of the population is under 6 years of age.

== Education ==
The primary and secondary school education is imparted by government, aided and private schools, under the School Education Department of the state. The medium of instruction followed by different schools are English, Telugu.

== See also ==
- List of census towns in Andhra Pradesh
