= Jarjapupeta =

Jarajapupeta
- Census Town
- Location in Andhra Pradesh, India
- Coordinates: 18°10′46″N 83°26′23″E
- Country: India
- State: Andhra Pradesh
- District: Vizianagaram

Area
  - Total: 2.30 km^{2} (0.89 sq mi)

Population (2011)
  - Total: 7,500
  - Density: 3,300/km^{2} (8,400/sq mi)

Languages
  - Official: Telugu
- Time zone: UTC+5:30 (IST)
- pin code: 535217
- Vehicle registration: AP

Jarajapupeta is a census town in Vizianagaram district of the Indian state of Andhra Pradesh. It is located in Nellimarla mandal of Vizianagaram revenue division.

== Demographics ==
As of 2001 India census, Jarjapupeta had a population of 5534. Males constitute 51% of the population and females 49%. Jarjapupeta has an average literacy rate of 57%, lower than the national average of 59.5%: male literacy is 67%, and female literacy is 46%. In Jarjapupeta, 11% of the population is under 6 years of age.

== Education ==
The primary and secondary school education is imparted by government, aided and private schools, under the School Education Department of the state. The medium of instruction followed by different schools are English, Telugu.
