= Sriramnagar, Ranga Reddy district =

Sriramnagar
- Village
- Interactive map of Sriramnagar
- Coordinates: 17°16′02″N 78°15′25″E
- Country: India
- State: Telangana
- District: Ranga Reddy
- Metro: Ranga Reddy district

Government
  - Body: Mandal Office

Languages
  - Official: Telugu
- Time zone: UTC+5:30 (IST)
- Planning agency: Panchayat
- Civic agency: Mandal Office

Sriramnagar is a village and panchayat in Ranga Reddy district, Telangana, India. It falls under Moinabad mandal.
