= Chintalavalasa =

- Census Town
- Location in Andhra Pradesh, India
- Coordinates: 18°04′03″N 83°24′34″E
- Country: India
- State: Andhra Pradesh
- District: Vizianagaram

Area
  - Total: 3.59 km^{2} (1.39 sq mi)

Population (2011)
  - Total: 5,921
  - Density: 1,650/km^{2} (4,270/sq mi)

Languages
  - Official: Telugu
- Time zone: UTC+5:30 (IST)
- Vehicle registration: AP

Chintalavalasa is a census town in Vizianagaram district of the Indian state of Andhra Pradesh. It is located in Denkada mandal of Vizianagaram revenue division.

== Demographics ==
As of 2001 India census, Chintalavalasa had a population of 6421. Males constitute 52% of the population and females 48%. Chintalavalasa has an average literacy rate of 67%, higher than the national average of 59.5%; with male literacy of 72% and female literacy of 61%. 12% of the population is under 6 years of age.

== Education ==
The primary and secondary school education is imparted by government, aided and private schools, under the School Education Department of the state. The medium of instruction followed by different schools are English, Telugu.
