= Sriramnagar, Vizianagaram =

Sriramnagar
- Census Town
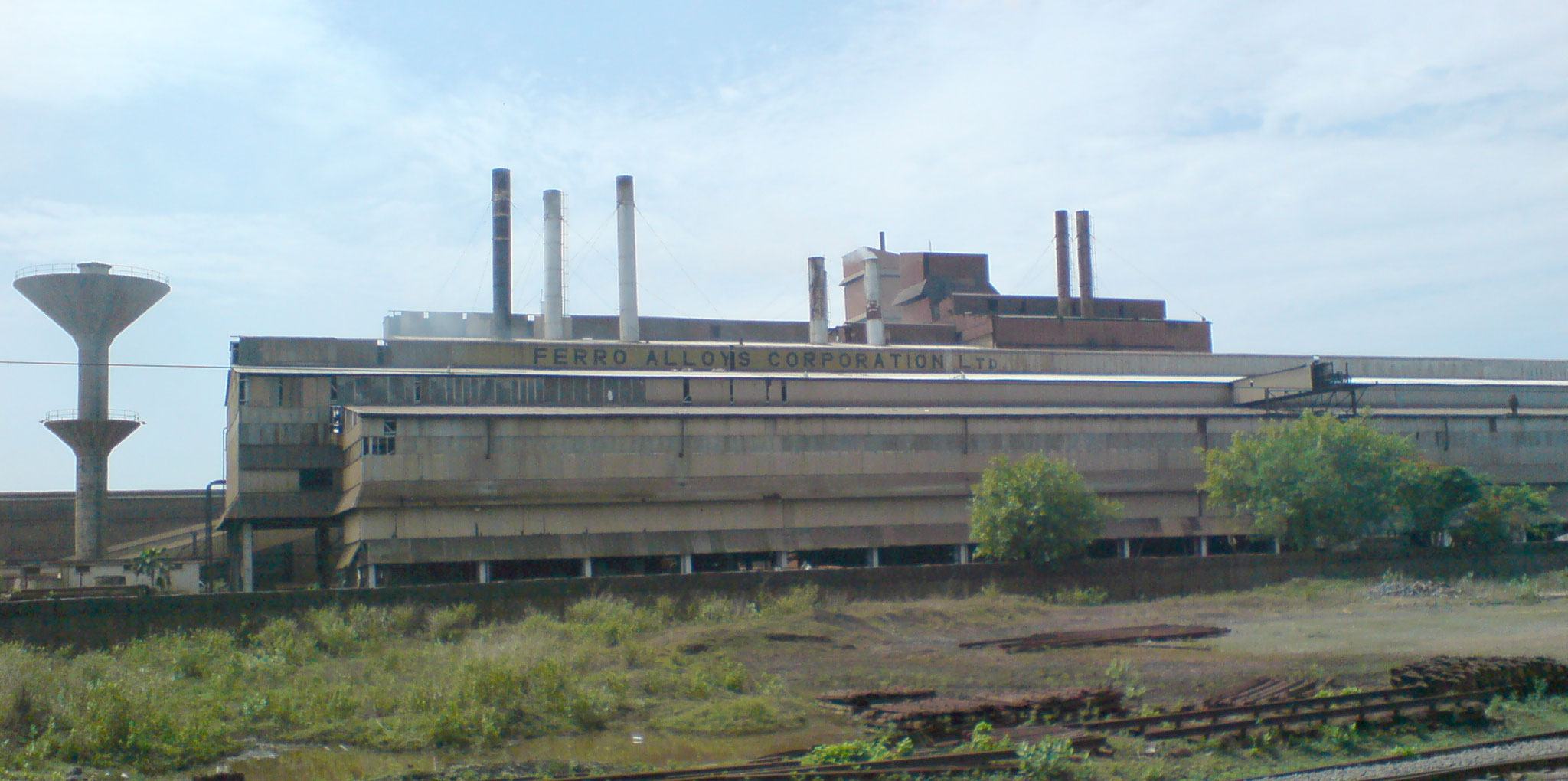
- Ferro Alloys Corporation, Sriramnagar

- Location in Andhra Pradesh, India
- Coordinates: 18.2844°N 83.5406°E
- Country: India
- State: Andhra Pradesh
- District: Vizianagaram

Area
  - Total: 7.72 km^{2} (2.98 sq mi)

Population (2011)
  - Total: 18,893
  - Density: 2,450/km^{2} (6,340/sq mi)

Languages
  - Official: Telugu
- Time zone: UTC+5:30 (IST)
- PIN: 535 101
- Vehicle registration: AP

Sriramnagar is a census town in Vizianagaram district of the Indian state of Andhra Pradesh. It is located in Garividi mandal of Vizianagaram revenue division.

== Demographics ==
As of 2001 India census, Sriramnagar had a population of 19,550. Males constitute 50% of the population and females 50%. Sriramnagar has an average literacy rate of 64%, higher than the national average of 59.5%: male literacy is 73%, and female literacy is 56%. In Sriramnagar, 11% of the population is under 6 years of age.

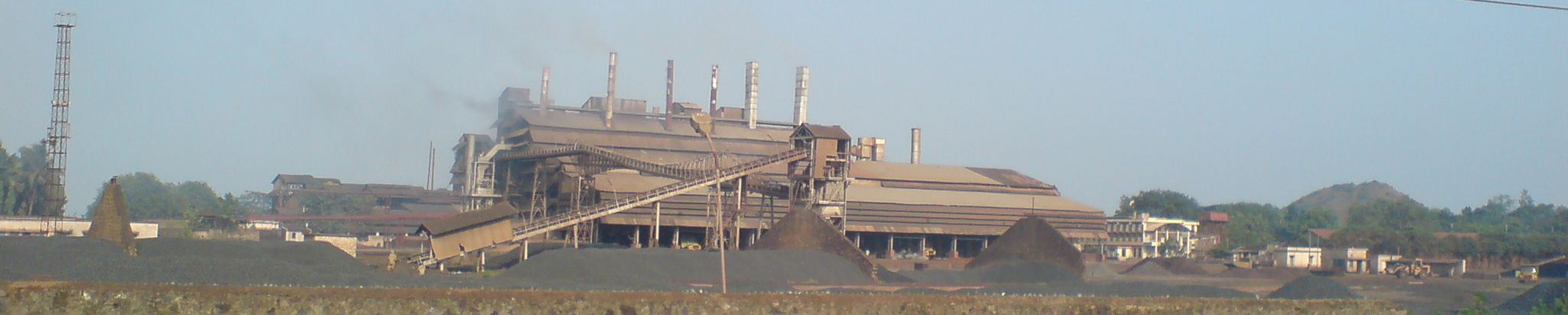
FACOR, Sriramnagar

== Education ==
The primary and secondary school education is imparted by government, aided and private schools, under the School Education Department of the state. The medium of instruction followed by different schools are English, Telugu.
