= Chodavaram, Prakasam district =

Chodavaram
- village
- Interactive map of Chodavaram
- Location in Andhra Pradesh, India Chodavaram (India)
- Coordinates: 15.371336°N 79.9440°E
- Country: India
- State: Andhra Pradesh
- District: Prakasam
- Talukas: Kondapi

Languages
  - Official: Telugu
- Time zone: UTC+5:30 (IST)
- PIN: 523279
- Telephone code: 08598

Chodavaram settlement's location code or village code is 591308 according to data from the Census of 2011. The village of Chodavaram is situated in Andhra Pradesh's Kondapi mandal in the Prakasam district. It is located 38 km from the district headquarters in Ongole and 7 km from the sub-district headquarters in Kondapi (tehsildar office). Chodavaram hamlet also has a gramme panchayat, according to 2009 statistics.

The village has a total size of 1042 hectares. There are 1,638 people living in Chodavaram in total, 821 of them are men and 817 of whom are women. The literacy rate in the village of Chodavaram is 60.01%, with 66.87% of men and 53.12% of women being literate. In the village of Chodavaram, there are roughly 404 homes. The locality code for Chodavaram village is 523279.
