= Chodavaram, Konaseema district =

Chodavaram
- village
- Interactive map of Chodavaram
- Location in Andhra Pradesh, India Chodavaram (India)
- Coordinates: 16°51′07″N 82°03′24″E
- Country: India
- State: Andhra Pradesh
- District: Konaseema

Population (2010)
  - Total: 5,000

Languages
  - Official: Telugu
- Time zone: UTC+5:30 (IST)

Chodavaram is a small village in Ramachandrapuram Mandal, Konaseema district, Andhra Pradesh, India.
