= Kanuru =

- Neighbourhood
- Location in Andhra Pradesh, India
- Coordinates: 16°17′10″N 81°15′16″E
- Country: India
- State: Andhra Pradesh
- District: Krishna
- Mandal: Penamaluru
- City: Vijayawada
- Metro: Andhra Pradesh Capital Region

Area
  - Total: 9.02 km^{2} (3.48 sq mi)

Population (2011)
  - Total: 49,006
  - Density: 5,430/km^{2} (14,100/sq mi)

Languages
  - Official: Telugu
- Time zone: UTC+5:30 (IST)
- Postal code: 520007

Kanuru is a neighborhood in Vijayawada, Krishna district of the Indian state of Andhra Pradesh.It is one of the Major educational hub of the city. As per the G.O. No. M.S.104 (dated:23-03-2017), Municipal Administration and Urban Development Department, it became a part of Vijayawada metropolitan area.

== Demographics ==
As of 2011 India census, Kanuru had a population of 49006. Of which male population is 26,574 and female population is 22,432. The average literacy rate is 85.07% and 4,401 of the population is under 6 years of age.

== See also ==
- List of census towns in Andhra Pradesh
