= Chodavaram, Anakapalli district =

Chodavaram
- Census town
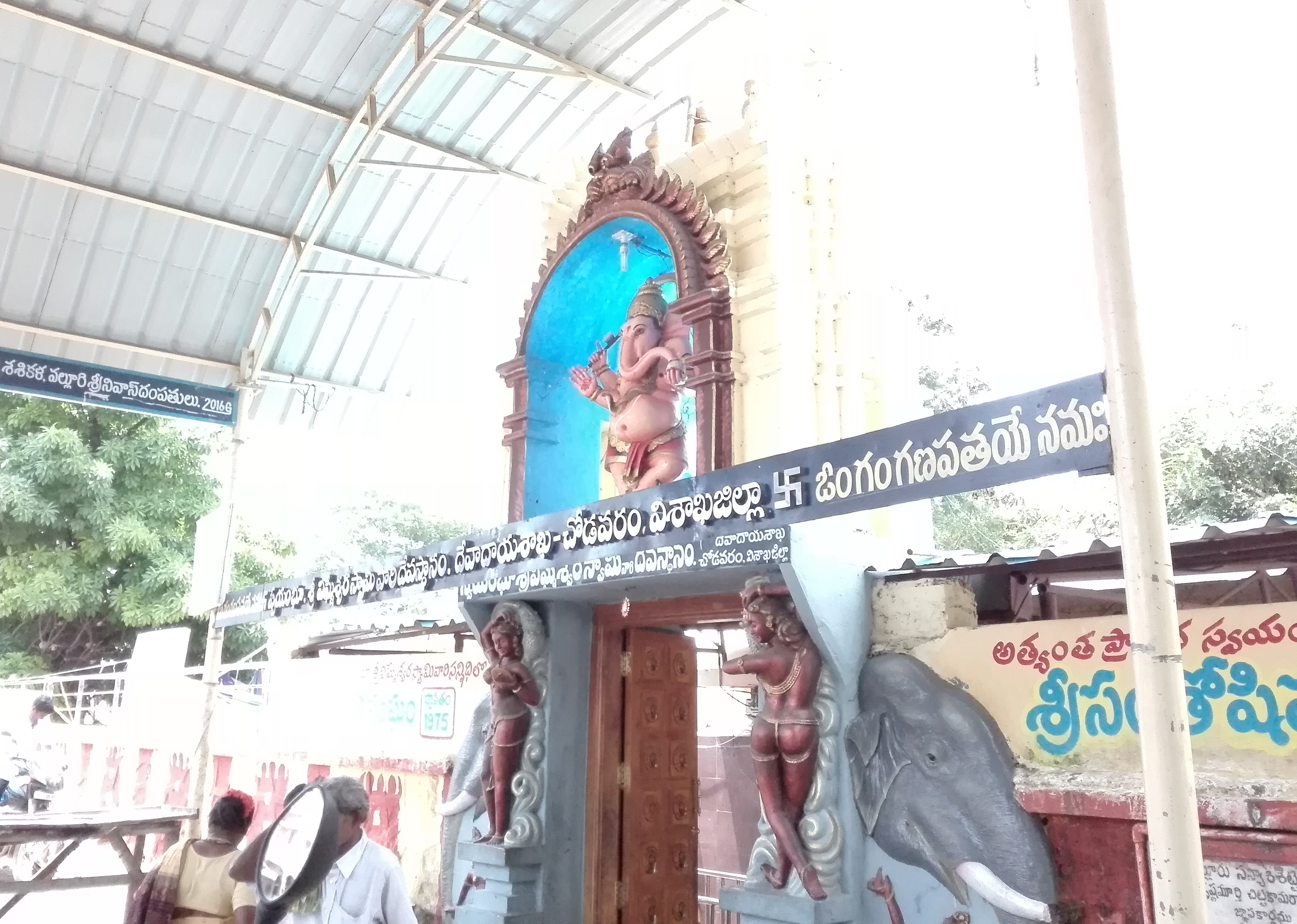
- Entrance arch of Chodavaram Ganesh Temple

- Location in Andhra Pradesh, India Chodavaram (India)
- Coordinates: 17.8333°N 82.9500°E
- Country: India
- State: Andhra Pradesh
- District: Anakapalli district

Government
  - MLA: K S N S Raju
- Elevation: 39 m (128 ft)

Languages
  - Official: Telugu
- Time zone: UTC+5:30 (IST)
- Vehicle Registration: AP31 (Former); AP39 (from 30 January 2019)

Chodavaram (Telugu: చోడవరం; Telugu pronunciation: [tʃoːɖawaram]) is a town in Anakapalli district in the Indian state of Andhra Pradesh. The town is located on the country's east coast. It falls under Visakhapatnam Metropolitan Region Development Authority. The town has one of the largest cooperative Sugar factories in state.

== History ==
The original name of the town was Chola Varam. The Chola dynasty (300 BC to 1279 AD), at that time rulers of Tamil Nadu and coastal Andhra Pradesh, founded Chola Varam as a border post en route to the Gajapathi kingdom of Orissa.

== Demographics ==
As of the census of 2011, the town's population was 20,251, composed of 9,868 males and 10,383 females. The sex ratio was 1,052; versus a state average was 993. 2,035 children were aged 0–6, comprising 10.05% of Chodavaram's population and creating a child sex ratio of approximately 951; the state average is 939.

The literacy rate in the town of Chodavaram is approximately 77.49%; the state rate is 67.02%. The town has a vast court complex headed by a senior magistrate.

== Legislative assembly ==
Chodavaram is an assembly constituency. 154,712 voters were registered in the Chodavaram constituency along with Butchiyyapeta, Ravikamatham and Rolugunta, according to the 1999 elections. Chodavaram MLA constituency comes under Anakapalle parliament constituency.

Elected Members

- 1951 - Kandarpa Venkataramesam (KLP)
- 1955 - Reddi Jagannadham Naidu (Cong)
- 1967 - Sri Vechalapu Palavelly (Cong)
- 1972 - Sri Vechalapu Palavelly (Cong)
- 1978 - Emani Seetha Rama Sastry (Janata Party)
- 1983 - Gunuru Erri Naidu (Milatri Naidu) (TDP)
- 1985 - Gunuru Erri Naidu (Milatri Naidu) (TDP)
- 1989 - Balireddi Satya Rao (Cong)
- 1994 - Gunuru Erri Naidu (Milatri Naidu) (TDP)
- 1999 - Balireddi Satya Rao (Cong)
- 2004 - Ganta Srinivasa Rao (TDP)
- 2008 - Ganta Srinivasa Rao (resigned as MLA and joined in PRP)
- 2009 - KSNS Raju (TDP)
- 2014 - KSNS Raju (TDP)
- 2019 - Karanam Dharmasri (YSRCP)
- 2024 - KSNS Raju (TDP)

== Education ==
Primary and secondary education is provided by the government, aided by private schools. Instruction is offered in English & Telugu. There are several government primary and upper primary schools present in this town. For secondary education government high school as well as zilla parishad girl's high school are present. Government schools in this town are most popular among poor and middle-class people and they offer very good education. Important private schools include Bhashyam school, Amar school, Chalapathi, Mahathi, Sri vignan public school, Ravi Convent and Adams public school. For higher education government junior college as well as government degree college are present. There is also a government polytechnic in Chodavaram with limited facilities. Important private colleges include Ushodaya junior and degree college and Vidhyardi college. Most people prefer to study higher education such as engineering from nearby city Visakhapatnam, the colleges operate their busses to the town daily.
