= Penamaluru =

- Neighbourhood
- Location in Andhra Pradesh, India
- Coordinates: 16°28′05″N 80°43′10″E
- Country: India
- State: Andhra Pradesh
- District: Krishna
- City: Vijayawada
- Metro: Andhra Pradesh Capital Region

Area
  - Total: 6.68 km^{2} (2.58 sq mi)

Population (2011)
  - Total: 13,170
  - Density: 1,970/km^{2} (5,110/sq mi)

Languages
  - Official: Telugu
- Time zone: UTC+5:30 (IST)
- Postal code: 521139
- Vehicle registration: AP–16, from Jan 31 2019 all new vehicles in Andhra Pradesh are marked as AP-39 (in every district)
- Lok Sabha constituency: Machilipatnam

Penamaluru is a Locality of Vijayawada in Krishna district of the Indian state of Andhra Pradesh. It is the mandal headquarters of Penamaluru mandal . As per the G.O. No. M.S.104 (dated:23-03-2017), Municipal Administration and Urban Department, it became a part of vijayawada metropolitan area.

== Transport ==
Bus numbers to go to Vijayawada Bus Station and Railway station from Penamaluru are 10, 10K and 23H. We can get Bus Nos.333 and 222 from Penamaluru Center to go to Vijayawada Railway Station.

== Etymology ==
The village got its name by Pinamalleswarudu and previously known as Mathab Ka Penamaluru.

== Government and politics ==
Penamaluru is represented by Penamaluru (Assembly constituency) for Andhra Pradesh Legislative Assembly. Bode Prasad is the present MLA of the constituency representing Telugu Desam Party.

== See also ==
- Villages in Penamaluru mandal
