= List of tourist attractions in Vijayawada =

Vijayawada formerly known as Bezawada, is the second most populous city in the Indian state of Andhra Pradesh. It is the administrative headquarters of the NTR district and a part of State's Capital Region. Vijayawada lies on the banks of Krishna River and Budameru Rivulet surrounded by the hills of Eastern Ghats.

== Religious Places ==
Vijayawada is considered to be a sacred place for famous temples, churches, mosques and jain temples. It also serves as the ritual host of Pushkaram (a river worshipping ritual in India) of River Krishna.

- Akkanna Madanna Caves: Akkanna Madanna Caves are located at the foothills of the Indrakeeladri Hill near the famous Kanaka Durga Temple. As per legends, these beautiful caves date back to the 7-century and are dedicated to Akkanna and Madanna who were ministers in the court of Quli Qutub Shah, the Nawab of Golconda. The rock-cut caves are triple-celled with pillared hall and are devoid of any ornamental moulding or sculpture. This architecture echoes the richness of the bygone era and the tragic end of the two great secretariats of Qutub Shah. The temple encompassed in the caves was constructed in the 17-century and there is a predecessor cave nearby that belongs to 2-century with idols of Trimurti, Brahma, Vishnu and Shiva.
- Gunadala Matha Shrine: In 1925, Rf. Arlati, the Rector of St. Joseph's Orphanage at Gunadala, installed a statue of Mary, mother of Jesus and later a church was built and consecrated in 1971, now popularly known as Gunadala Mary Matha Church. Since then the Feast of Our Lady of Lourdes became an annual event here, attended by hundreds of people. The church is situated on a hillock on the eastern side of the city.
- Kanaka Durga Temple: One of the most popular temples in and around Vijayawada, located on the Indrakeeladri on the banks of Krishna River. Kanaka Durga Temple is a Hindu Temple dedicated to Goddess Kanaka Durga. The temple is located in the heart of Vijayawada and is a 10 minute drive from the Vijayawada Railway Station and Vijayawada Bus Station, while being about 20 kilometre away from the Vijayawada Airport. Buses depart for the temple from both the bus stand and railway station every 20 minutes. One can either motor up the ghat road or take to the steps on foot. During Dasara, a special pujas are performed for 9 days known as Navaratri festival. This Navaratri festival is celebrated in this temple for every year. A large number of pilgrims from the city and its environs visited the temple after a holy dip in the River Krishna.
- Moghalrajapuram Caves: Mogalrajapuram Caves are five rock-cut cave temple groups located in different parts of Vijayawada, Andhra Pradesh, India. Dedicated to Shiva, they were excavated during the Eastern Chalukya reign or the Vishnukundins reign. They are generally dated to about the 7th century, after the Akkanna Madanna Caves.

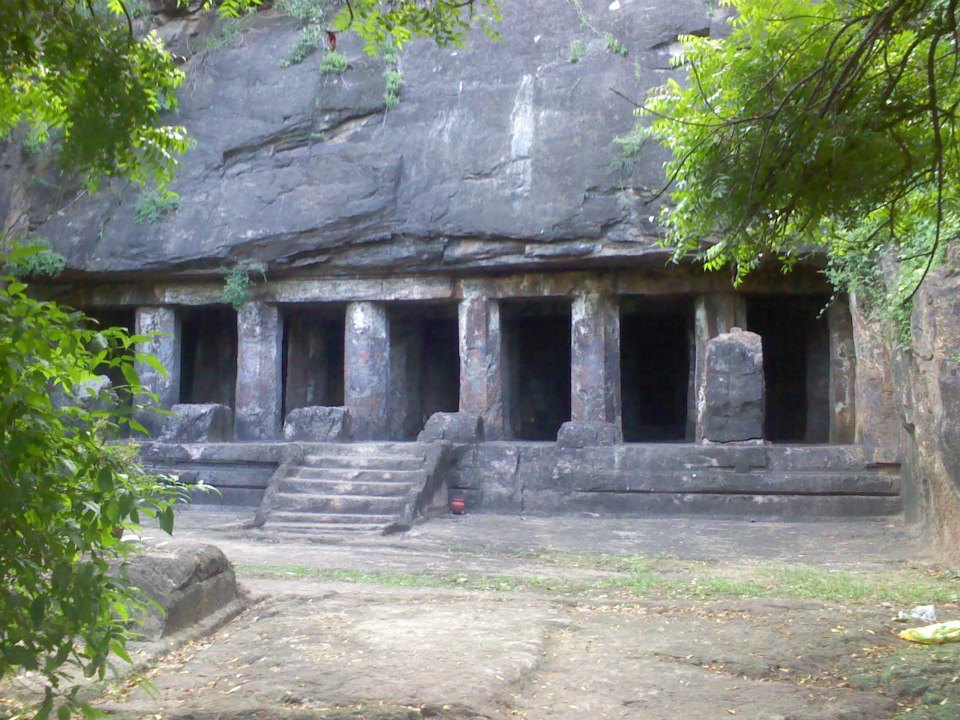
Akkanna madanna caves

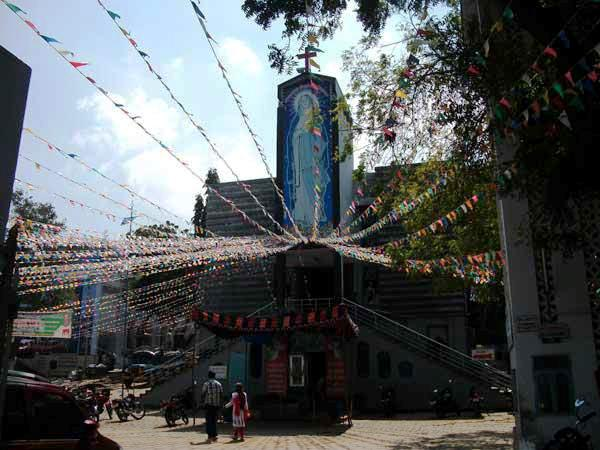
St Mary's Church at Gunadala Matha Shrine

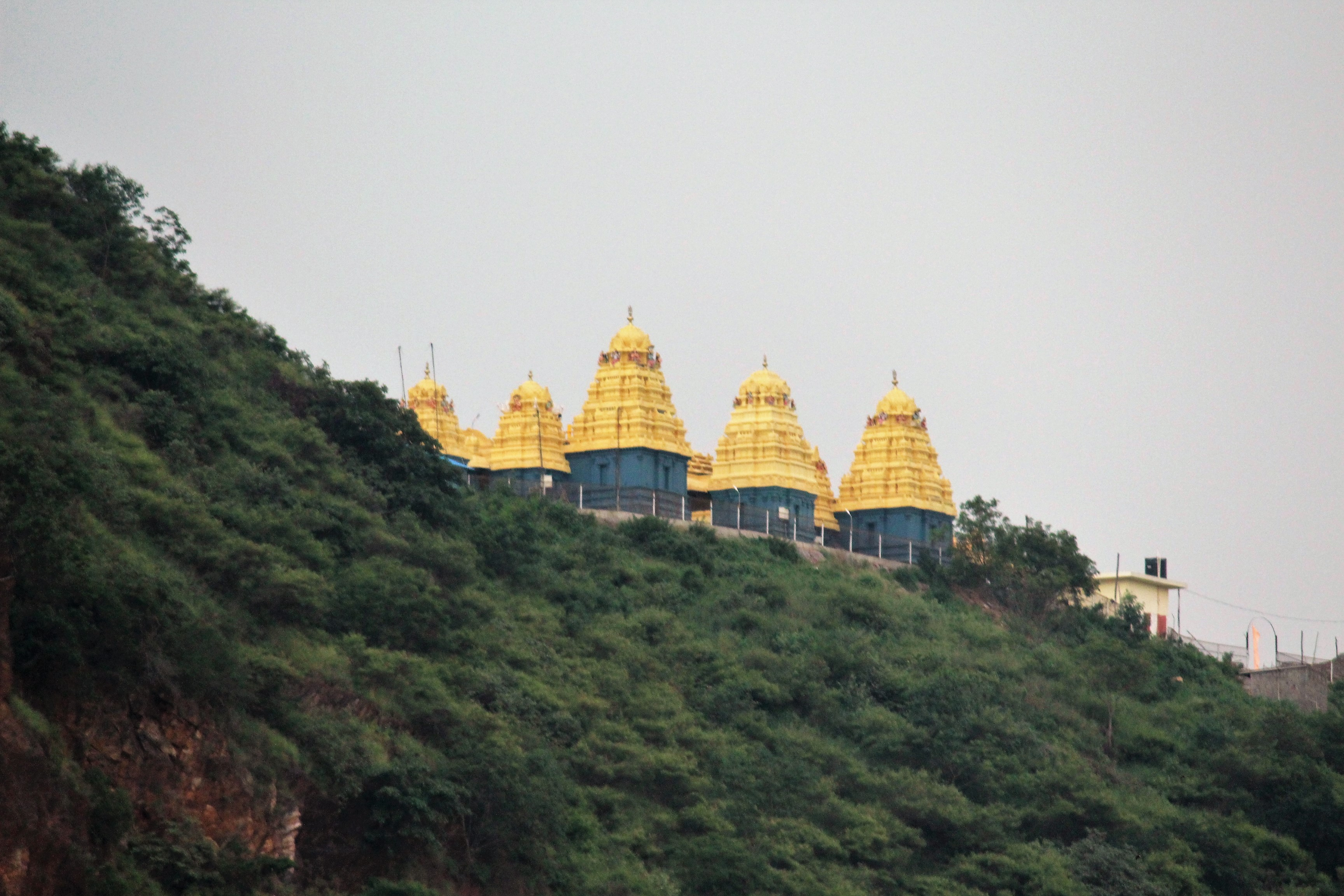
View of Kanaka Durga Temple from Parakasam Barrage in Vijayawada.

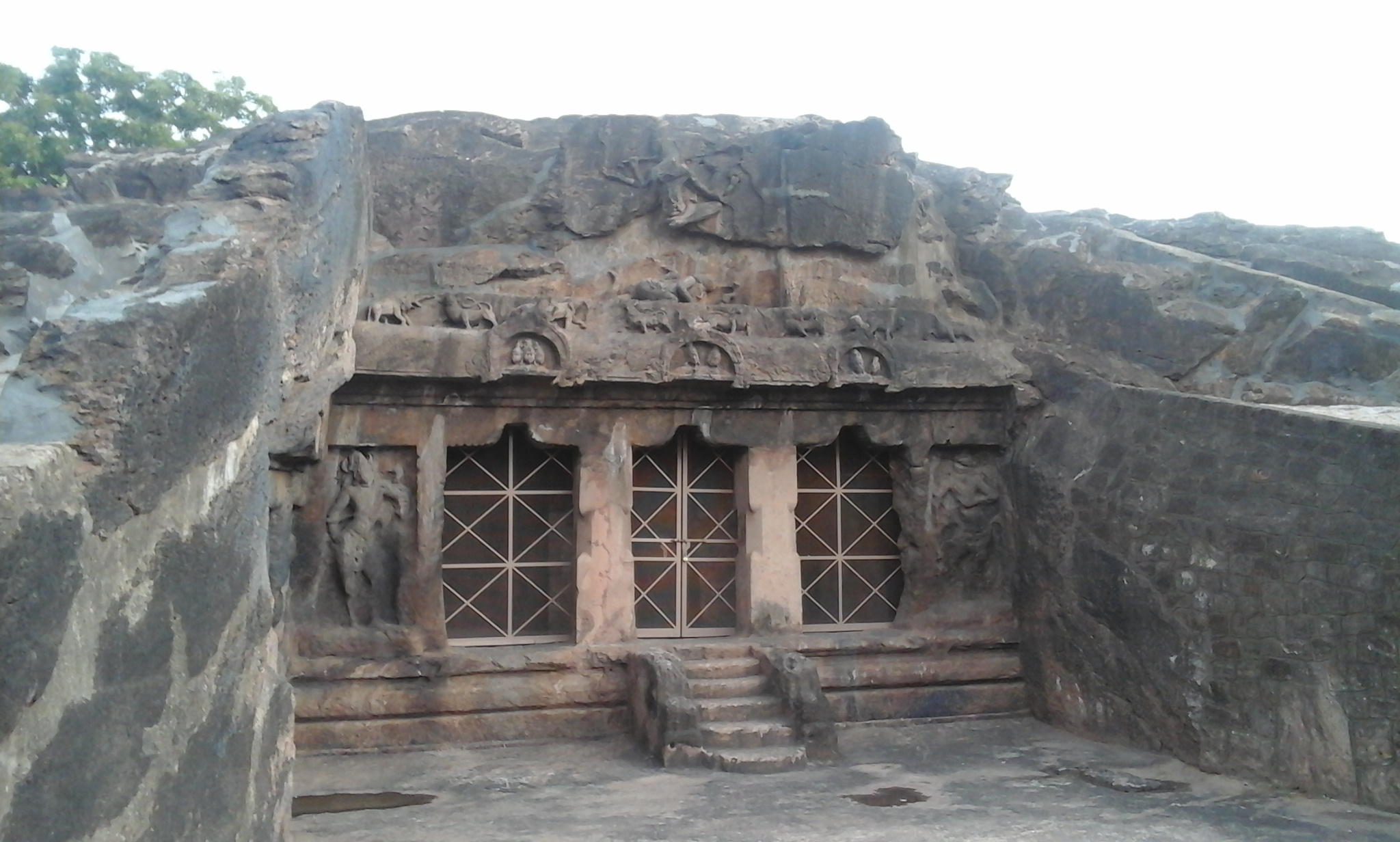
Moghalrajpuram Caves

== Landmarks ==
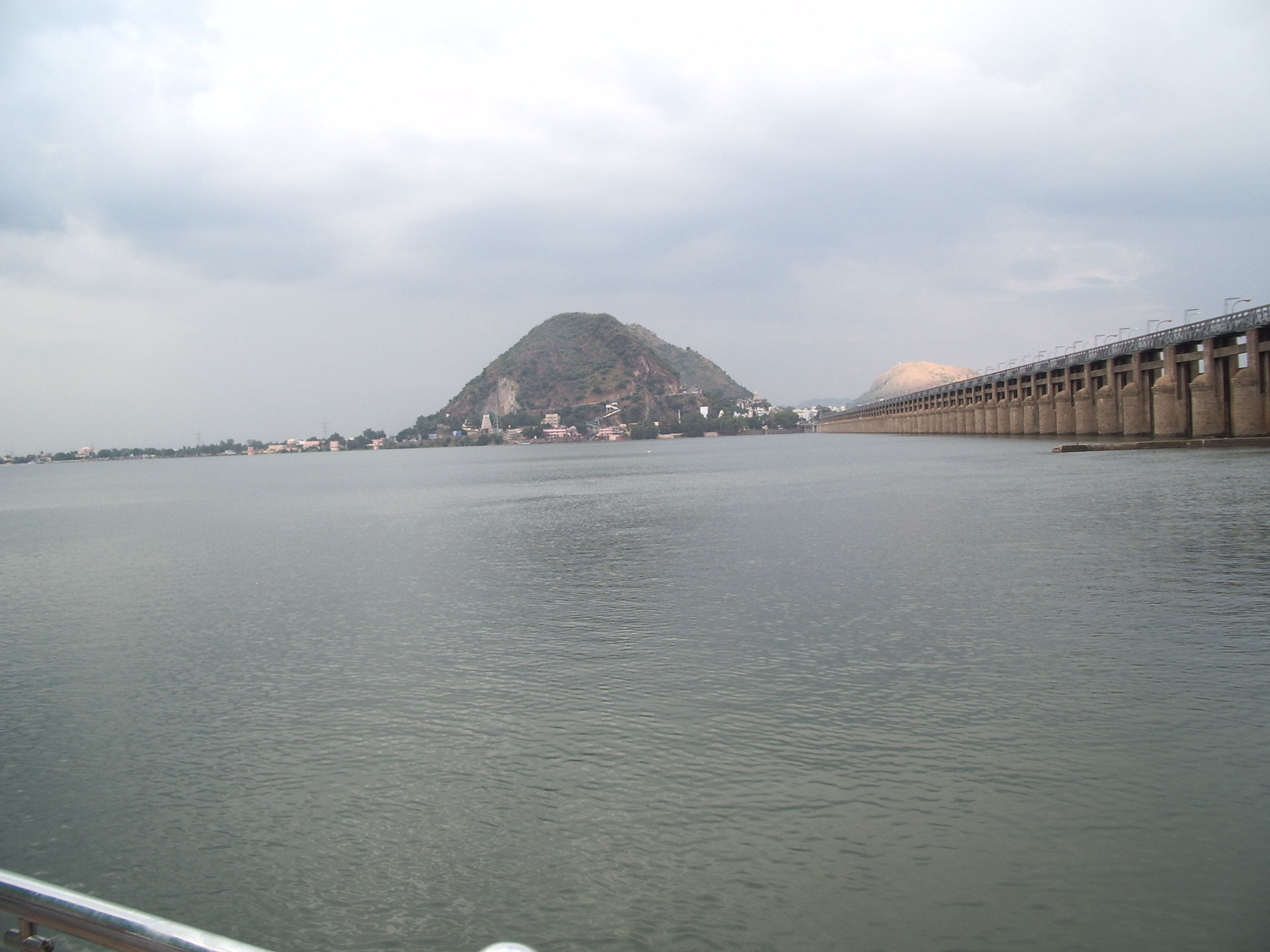
Rear view of Prakasam Barrage

- Prakasam Barrage: The original dam across the Krishna was built over a 150 years ago. The dam construction was started in 1852 and completed in 1855. And the present structure dates to the 1950s. It is 1,223.5 m (4,014 ft) long. Several canals through the city of Vijayawada terminate in a lake behind the barrage.
- Krishnaveni mandapam: It is also known as the river museum and located at the side of Prakasam Barrage. It was constructed by the Krishna Industrial and Agricultural Exhibition society which consists of geographical route map of River Krishna, world currency, Krishnamma Idol etc.
- Undavalli caves: Located in Other side of the Krishna River, five kilometers from Vijayawada, these caves are said to have been carved in the 7th century A.D. Buddhist monks used this two-storey cave structure as a rest house during the monsoon. A huge monolith of the Buddha in reclining posture is a magnificent sight.
- Rajiv Gandhi Park: Created by the Vijayawada Municipal Corporation with great care, this park welcomes the tourists at the entrance of the city with its impressive horticultural network. It includes a mini zoo and a musical water fountain. This park is open from 2pm to 8pm.
- Gandhi Hill: The first Gandhi memorial with seven stupas in the country was constructed on this hill at a height of 500 ft (150 m). The 52 ft (16 m) stupa was unveiled on 6 October 1968 by Dr. Zakir Hussain, the President of India. Gandhi Memorial Library, a sound and light show on Mahatma Gandhi's life and a planetarium are the other attractions.
- Victoria Jubilee Museum: A place for archaeology lovers, this museum has a carefully preserved collection of ancient sculptures, paintings, idols, weapons, cutlery, and inscriptions. This museum is closed temporarily due to repair works.
- Bhavani Island: Perhaps one of the largest islands on a river, Bhavani Island is located on Krishna River close to the city. AP Tourism is converting this 133-acre (54 hectare) island into an attractive tourist spot and a riverfront resort.
