= Allur =

Allur or Alluru or Alloor or Allooru may refer to:

== Places in India ==
- Alor, Bastar, a village in Kondagaon district, Chhattisgarh
- Allur, Gulbargha, a village in Kalaburagi district, Karnataka
- Alluru, Krishna District, a village in Krishna district, Andhra Pradesh
- Allur, Nellore district, a village in Nellore district, Andhra Pradesh
- Allur, Prakasam, a village in Prakasam district, Andhra Pradesh
- Allur, Tiruchirappalli district, a village in Tiruchirappalli district, Tamil Nadu

== See also ==
- Alluri, an Indian name
- Tiruvallur, a town in Tamil Nadu, India
