= Gunadala Matha Shrine =

- Our Lady of Lourdes, Mary Matha Church
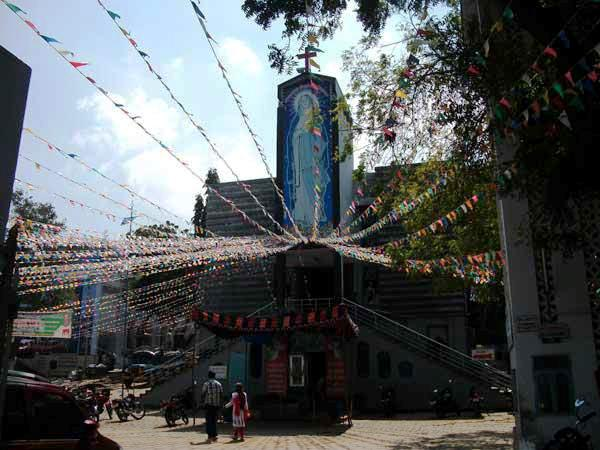
- Mary Matha Church at the base of the hill (2013)
- Gunadala Matha Shrine
- 16°31′15″N 80°39′34″E
- Location: Gunadala, Vijayawada
- Country: India
- Denomination: Roman Catholic
- Website: https://gunadalamathaofficial.com/

History
- Status: Church
- Founded: 1924
- Founder(s): Rf. Arlati (Rector of St. Joseph's Orphanage, Gunadala)
- Consecrated: 1971
- Events: Gunadala Matha Festival, Feast for Our Lady of Lourdes

Administration
- Diocese: Diocese of Vijayawada

Clergy
- Bishop: Thelegathoti Joseph Raja Rao
- Rector: William Jayaraju
- Vicar: Gabriel Mesapam

Gunadala Matha Shrine (also: Our Lady of Lourdes or Mary Matha Church), located in the city of Vijayawada, Andhra Pradesh, is a renowned Catholic pilgrimage site attracting approximately 10 lakh devotees during its annual festival. The site features a church, a grotto, and the stations of the Cross along the hill leading to the 18-foot-high holy cross erected at the hill's summit. It is considered the second biggest site dedicated to Saint Mary, mother of Jesus after the Basilica of Our Lady of Good Health at Velankanni in Tamil Nadu.

== Geography ==
Situated amidst a cluster of hillocks, Gunadala stands as the tallest hillock in the city, offering a unique topographical feature within the otherwise flat terrain. Roughly one-third of the hill's slopes are occupied by dwellings, distinguishing it from other smaller hills like Gandhi Hill and Indrakeeladri.

== Annual festival ==
The Gunadala Mary Matha festival takes place on February 9, 10 and 11 each year, becoming a significant event as devotees come not only from all corners of the state but from the neighboring Telangana, Tamil Nadu and Karnataka states during the festival. The festival commences at Padavala Revu, formerly a bustling wharf for boats traveling to Machilipatnam, and stretches along Eluru Road to the Ramavarappadu Junction.

During the festival, pilgrims visit the Mary Matha Church at the base of the hill and ascend on foot to pay their respects to the statue of Our Lady of Lourdes consecrated in 1925 within a grotto midway up the hill. Additionally, devotees offer prayers at the 18-foot-high holy cross erected at the hill's summit. The festival will also feature prayers and cultural programs at the nearby Bishop Grassi High School ground.

Many people come here to offer their hair as a symbol of their faith. They also break coconuts at the shrine. In addition to Christians, a significant number of individuals from various religious backgrounds also visit this location, believed to possess healing properties. Numerous worshippers attend the festival with their infants, seeking blessings from the Mother.

== History ==
The development of Gunadala, particularly the Mary Matha Shrine, is credited to the efforts of Catholic priest Huges Pezzoni. Starting with the establishment of an orphanage, Fr. Pezzoni laid the foundation for several Catholic institutions in Gunadala. According to the history chronicled by Fr. John Leoncini of the Vijayawada Catholic Diocese, Fr. Pezzoni acquired a 25-acre area through donations and purchases in 1923. The first manager of Gunadala Catholic Institutions, Fr. P Arlati, overcame numerous challenges to clear the land.

On June 24, 1924, the St. Joseph's orphanage was officially inaugurated, and Fr. Arlati installed a small statue of Our Lady of Lourdes (Mother Mary) in a natural grotto on the slopes of Gunadala hill the same year. In 1937, the Diocesan festival started. During that year, Fr .Arlati put a new statue in the Grotto, which is in the middle of the hill. This marked the beginning of the celebration of the feast of Our Lady of Lourdes, which was moved to September 8 every year. They also built an altar in front of the niche for Masses on various occasions.

To improve accessibility, they widened the pathway, deepened the Grotto, and leveled the ground in front of it. Despite the challenges, dedicated individuals like Monsignor A. Bianchi, the Vicar General, Reverend Brother Bertoli, and Reverend Brother Cripp worked tirelessly and patiently to complete these renovations. In 1947, after Monsignor Bianchi returned to Italy, Brother Bertoli continued the work. Due to issues caused by September rains for pilgrims, the feast of Our Lady of Lourdes was moved to February 11.

Subsequently, a church was constructed and consecrated in 1971, establishing the Feast of Our Lady of Lourdes as an annual event since then.
