= Bapu Museum, Vijayawada =

Bapu Museum
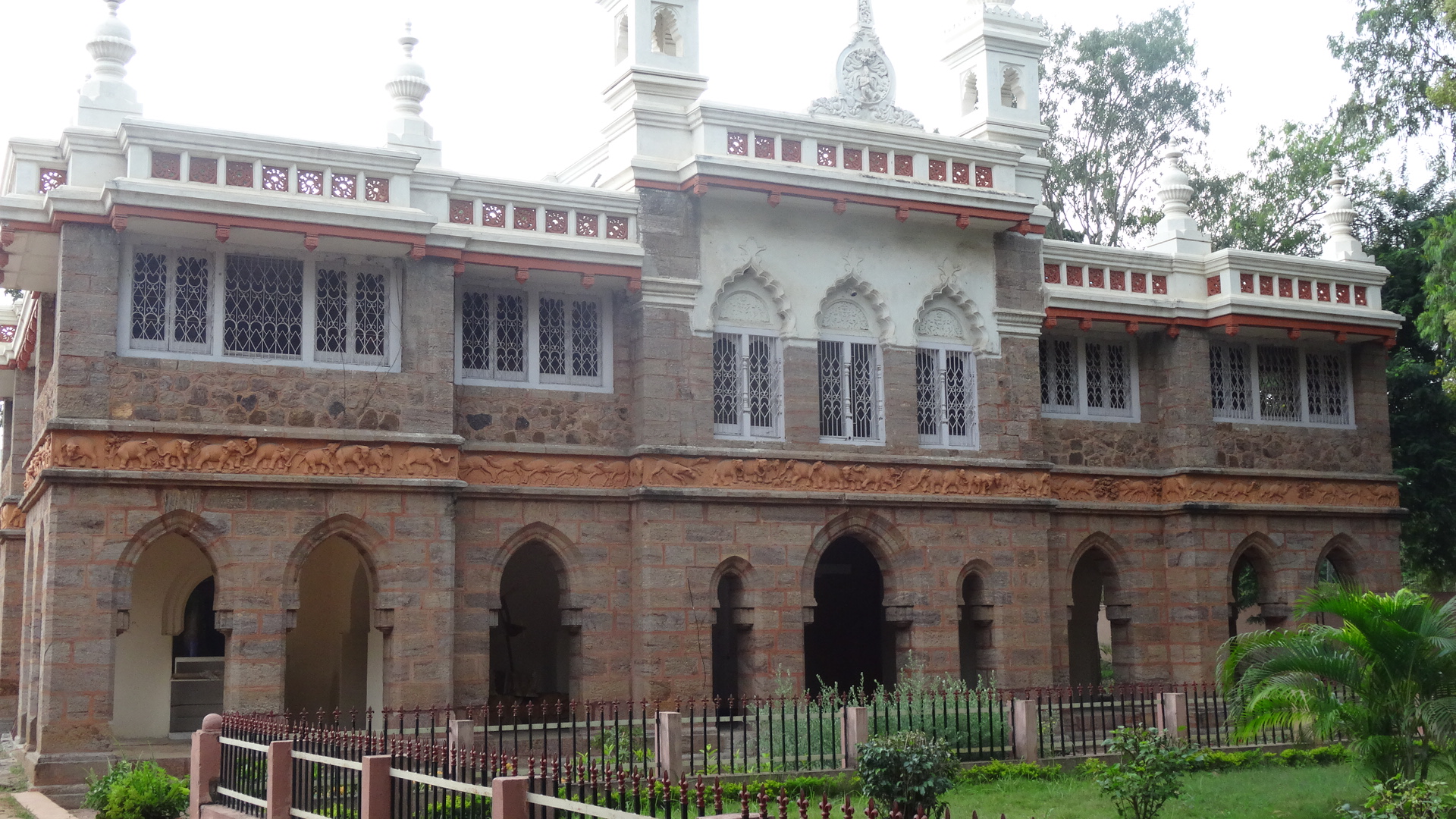
- Facade of the Bapu Museum
- Interactive map of Bapu Museum
- Coordinates: 16.508°N 80.628°E
- Created: 1887
- Operator: Department of Archaeology & Museums
- Status: opened

The Bapu Museum (formerly: Victoria Jubilee Museum) is an archaeological museum, located at M. G. Road of Vijayawada. It was renamed in the memory of the renowned film director, illustrator, cartoonist and author Bapu. The museum is maintained by the Archaeological department and has large collection of sculptures, paintings and artifacts of Buddhist and Hindu relics, with some of them as old as 2nd and 3rd Centuries. The structure of building is an Indo-European style of architectural and is more than a hundred years old structure.

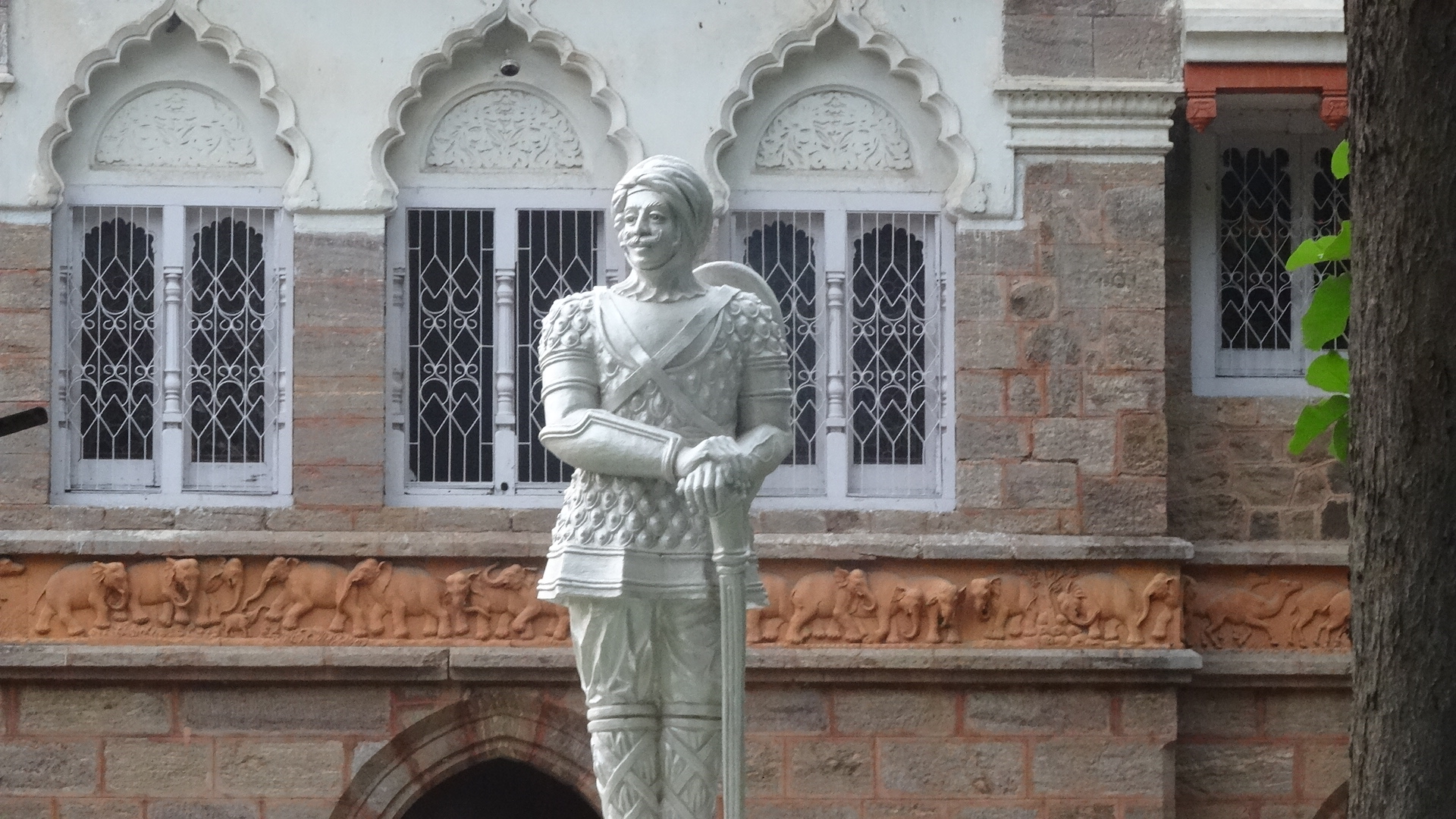
Statue of Nuzvid Zamindar at bapu museum

== History ==
The museum was created as part of the celebrations of the Golden Jubilee of Queen Victoria in 1887. The foundation stone was laid by Robert Sewell, District Collector of Krishna district, on 27 June 1887. Sri Pingali Venkayya presented a tri-colour flag to Mahatma Gandhi at this location in 1921. The building initially housed industrial exhibitions. It was converted to an archaeological museum under the auspices of the Department of Archaeology and Museums, Government of Andhra Pradesh, in 1962.

== Paintings and relics ==
The museum has historical galleries, stone cut writings, coins, swords, body armour, shields, arms, ornamentation, etc., used by kings. A standing Buddha of white limestone of Alluru (3rd–4th century), Lord Shiva and Goddess Durga as slaying the buffalo demon, Mahishasura (2nd century) can also be found at the museum.

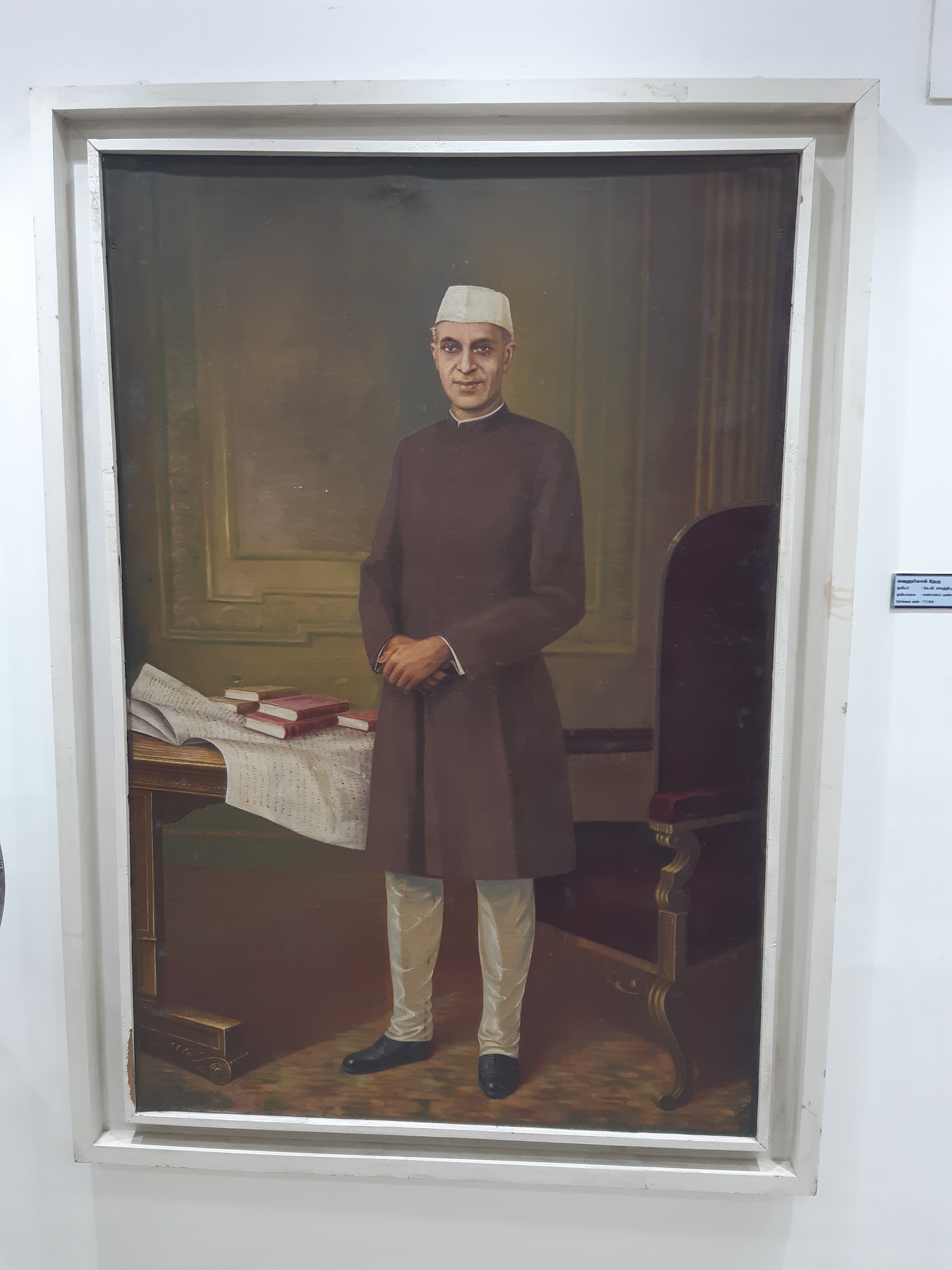
Painting of Jawaharlal Nehru

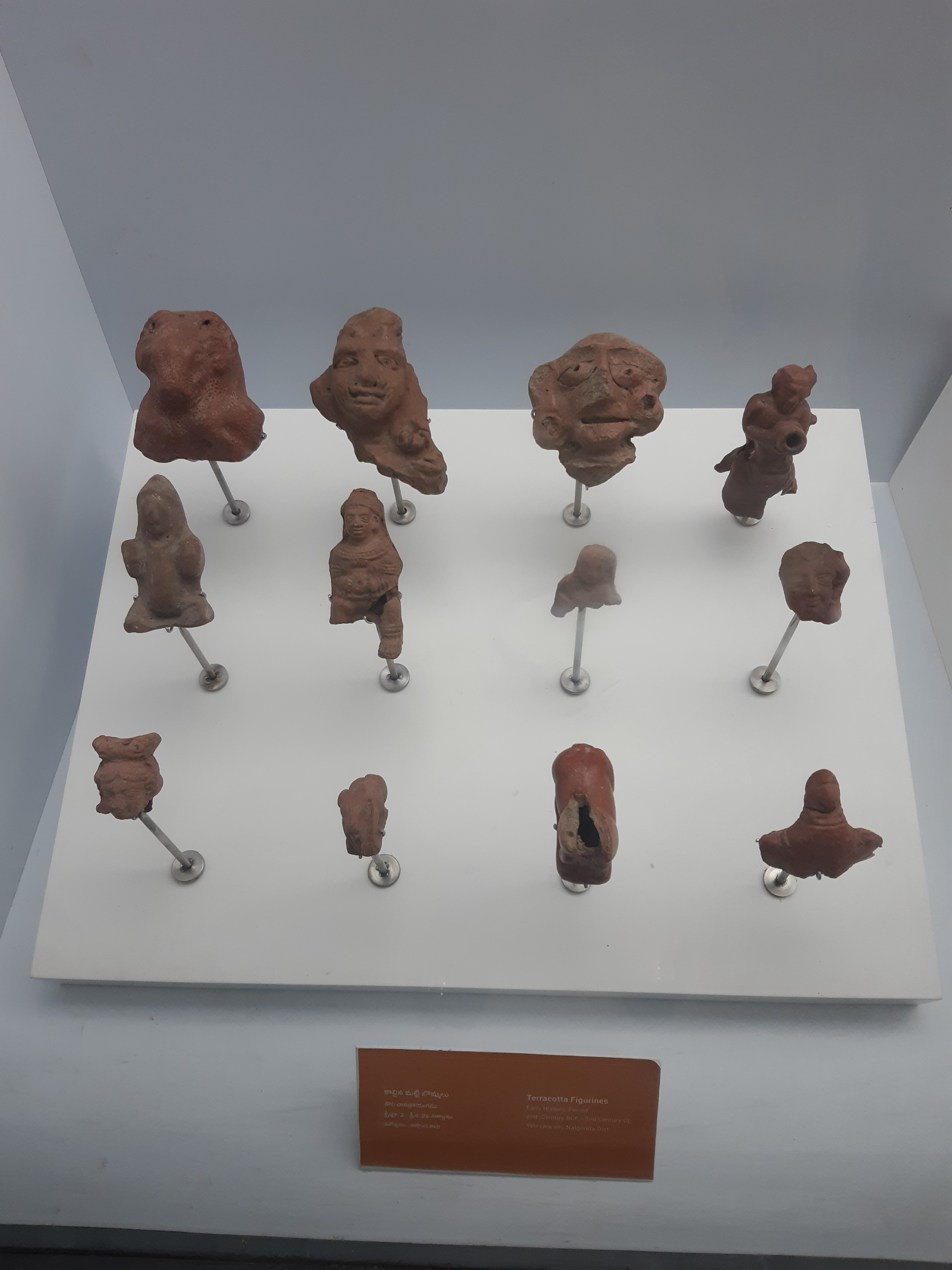
Kaolin and Stucco Figurines

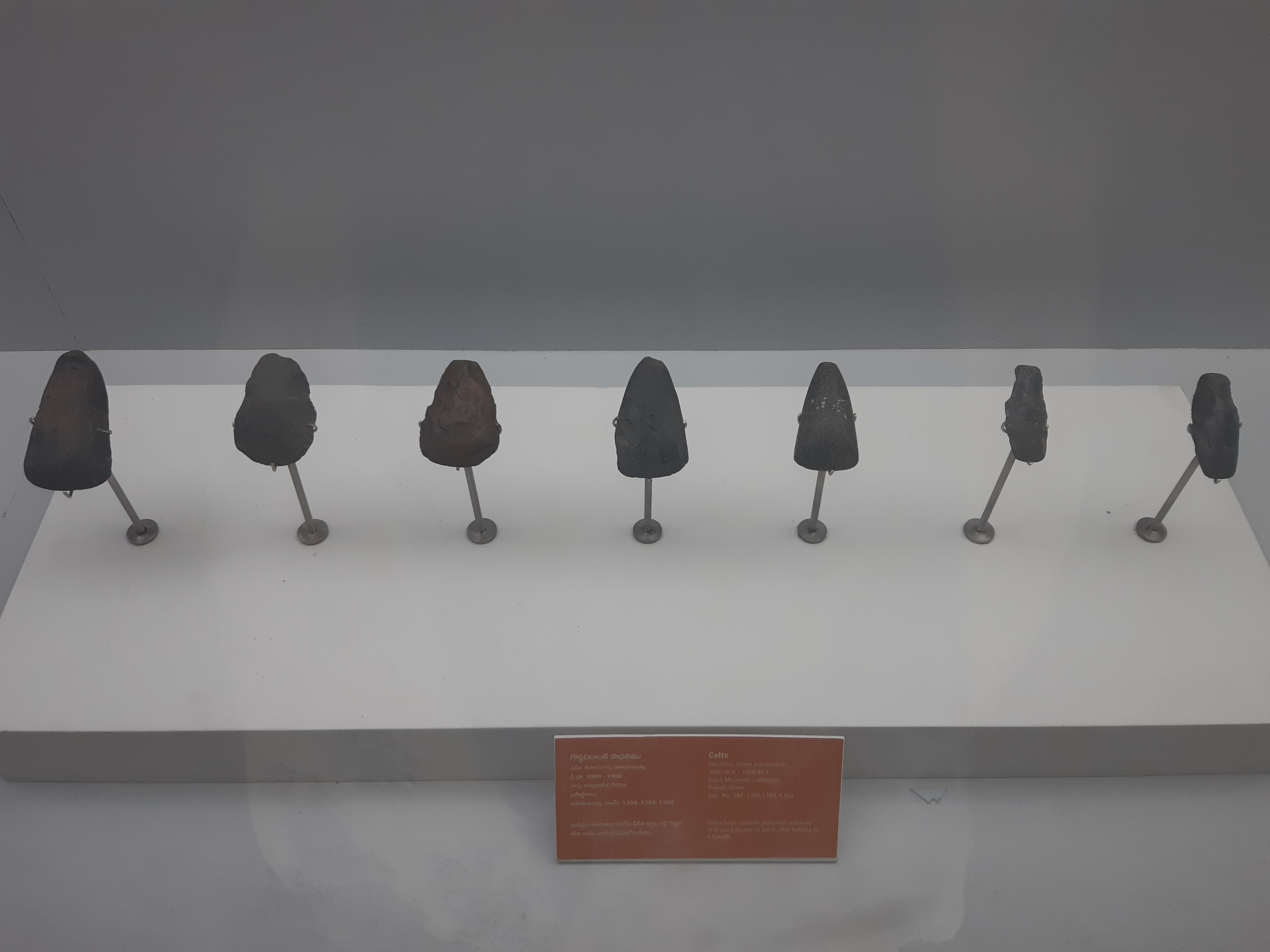
Celts

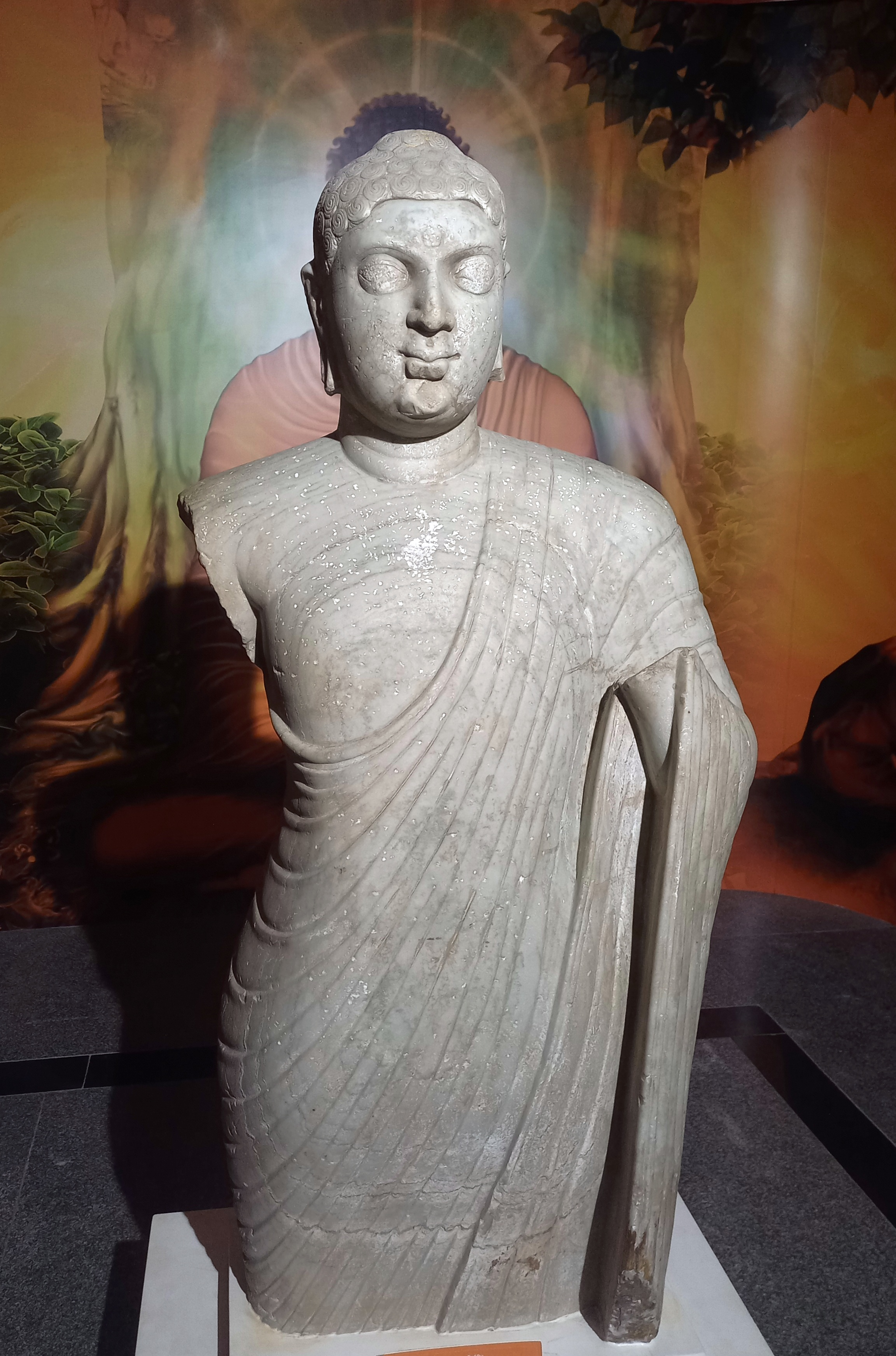
A limestonestatue of Buddha

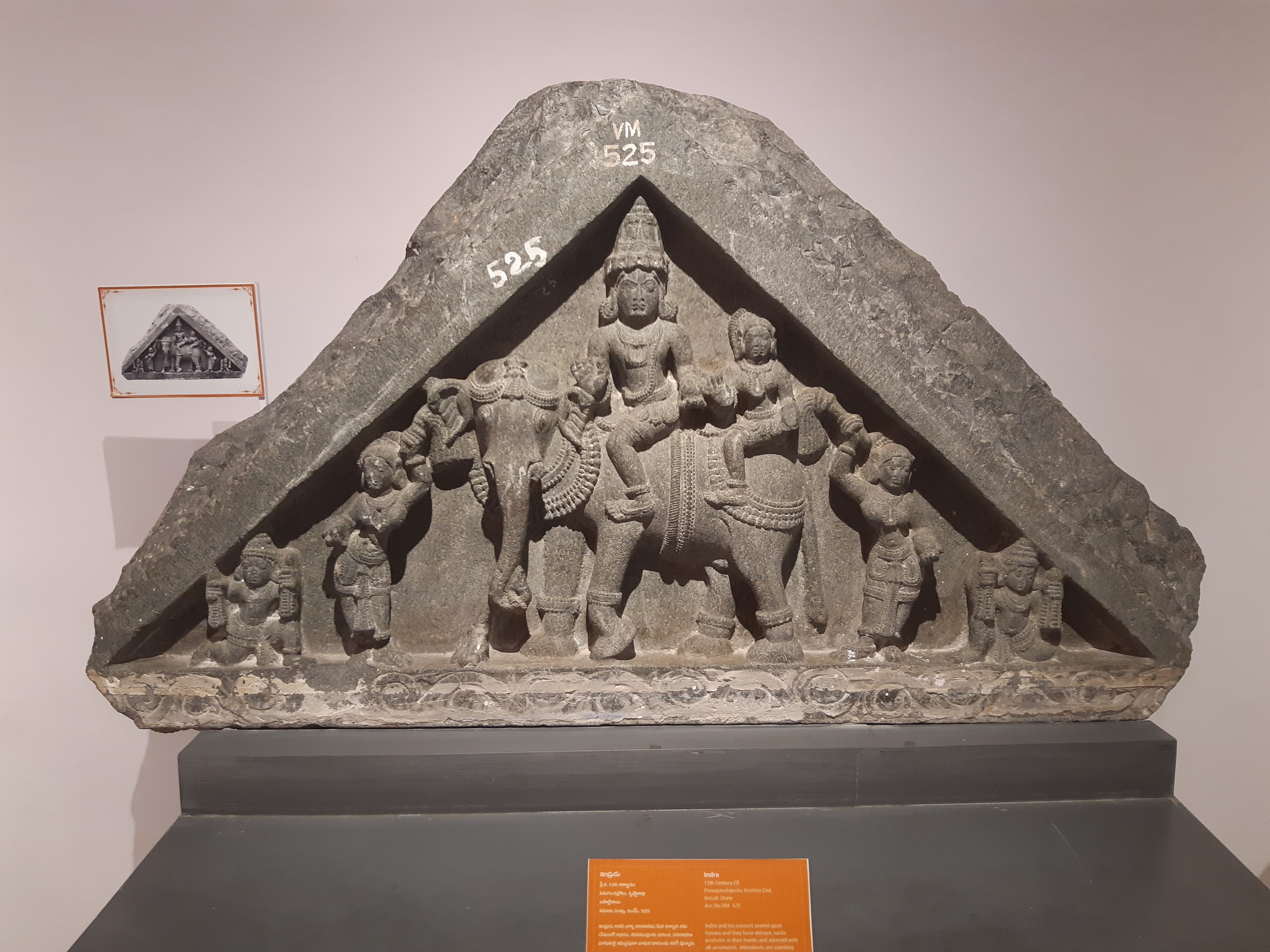
Indra statue made of Basalt stone

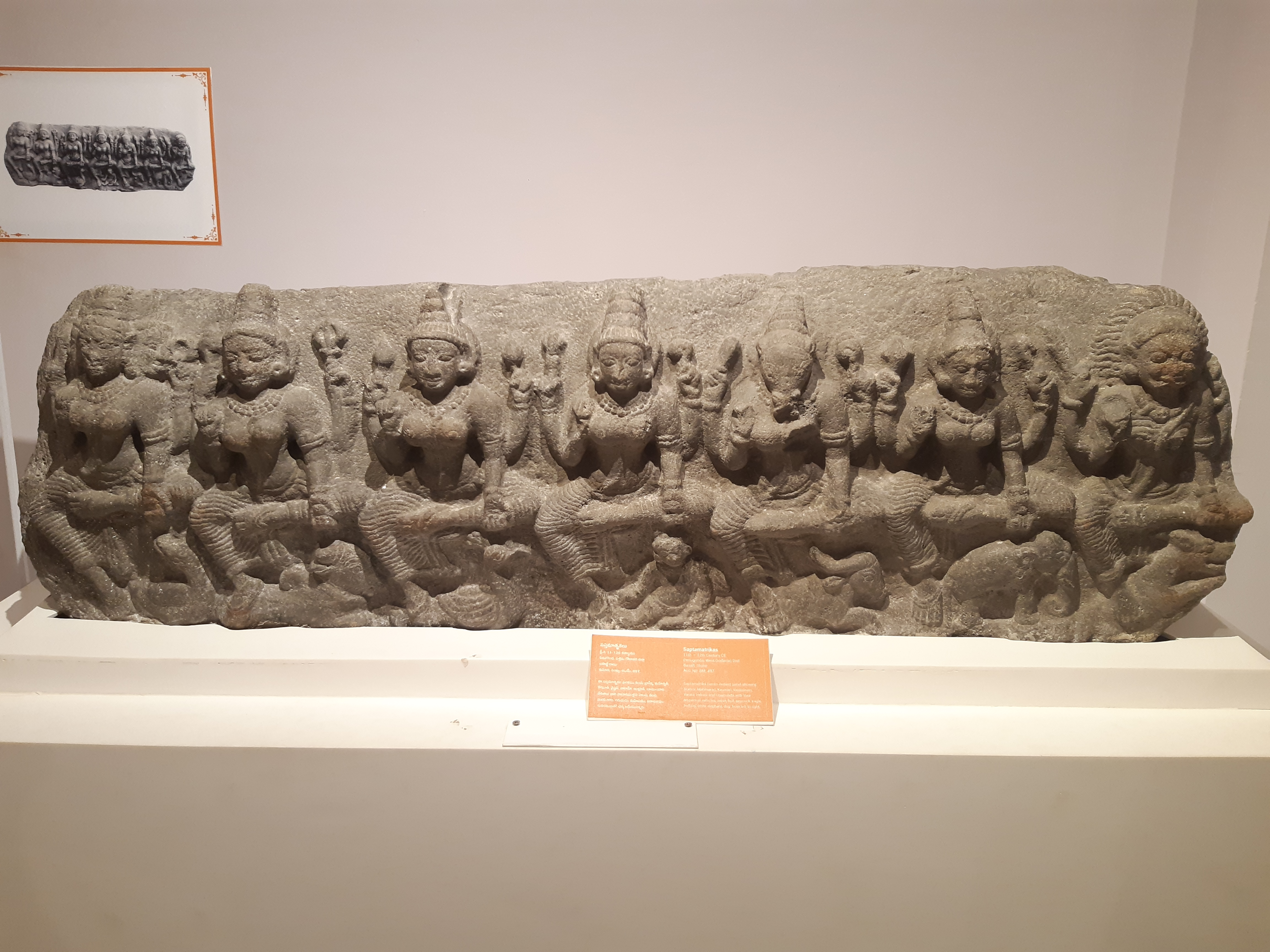
Sapthamatrikas
