= Ramavarappadu Junction =

- Ramavarappadu Ring
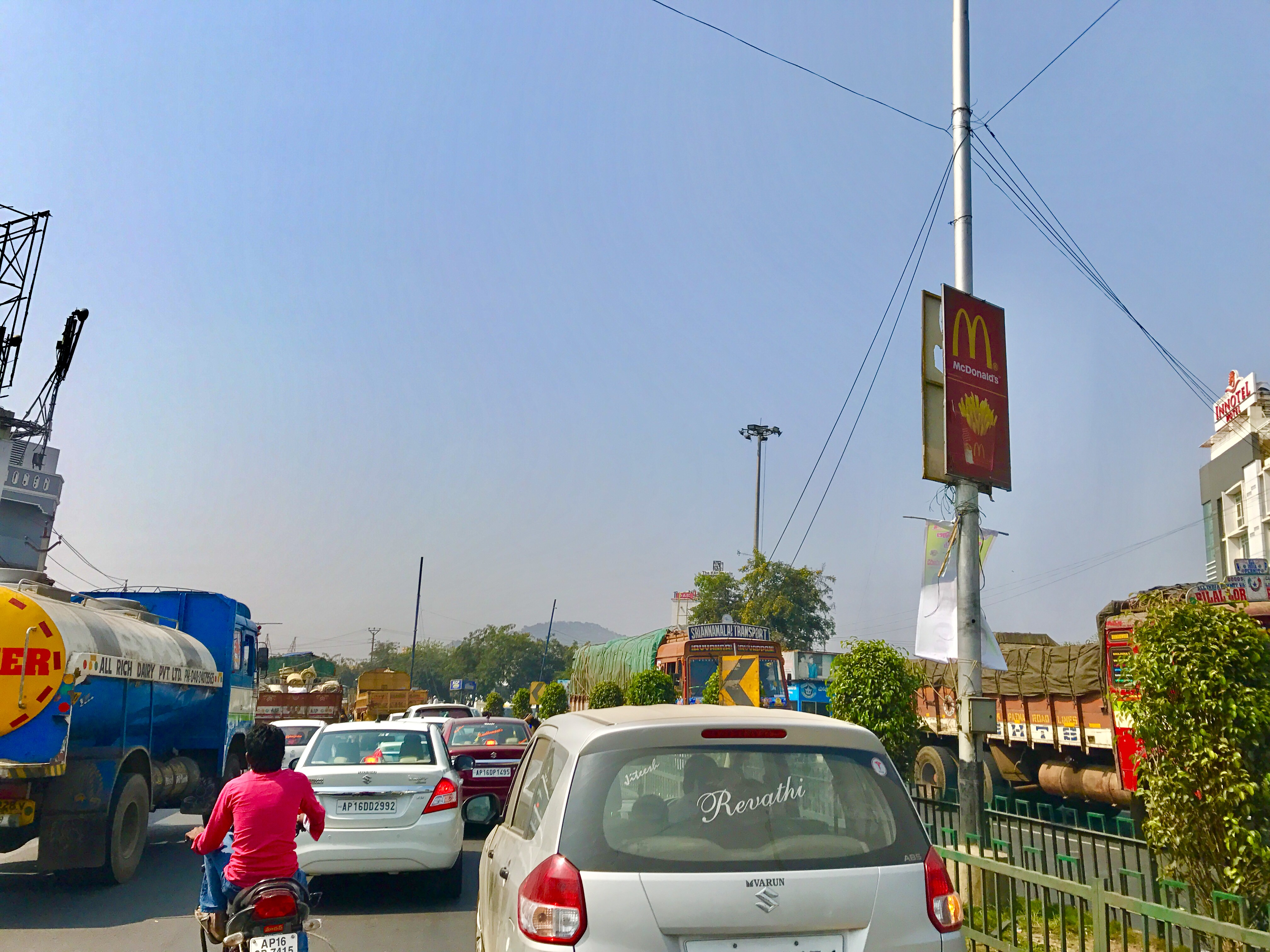
- Ramavarappadu Junction from AH-45
- Interactive map of Ramavarappadu Junction

Location
- Vijayawada, Andhra Pradesh
- Coordinates: 16.523813°N 80.677441°E
- Roads at junction: NH16; Vijayawada Inner Ring Road

Construction
- Type: Roundabout

Ramavarappadu Junction is one of the busiest chowks (roundabout / traffic circle) and a prominent landmark located on National Highway 16 in the Indian City of Vijayawada, Andhra Pradesh. Two highways, NH16 and Vijayawada Inner Ring Road, intersect at this junction.

== Traffic ==
Ramavarappadu Junction is one of the busiest junctions in Vijayawada. The Green Loop of Vijayawada BRTS and the Vijayawada Inner Ring Road meet with National Highway 16 at this junction. Metro station will come up at the Ramavarappadu circle junction. The CRDA is planning to construct a big arch at the Ramavarappadu ring junction to welcome the people who come from Eluru on the national highway.
