= Bhavani Island =

Island in Vijayawada, India

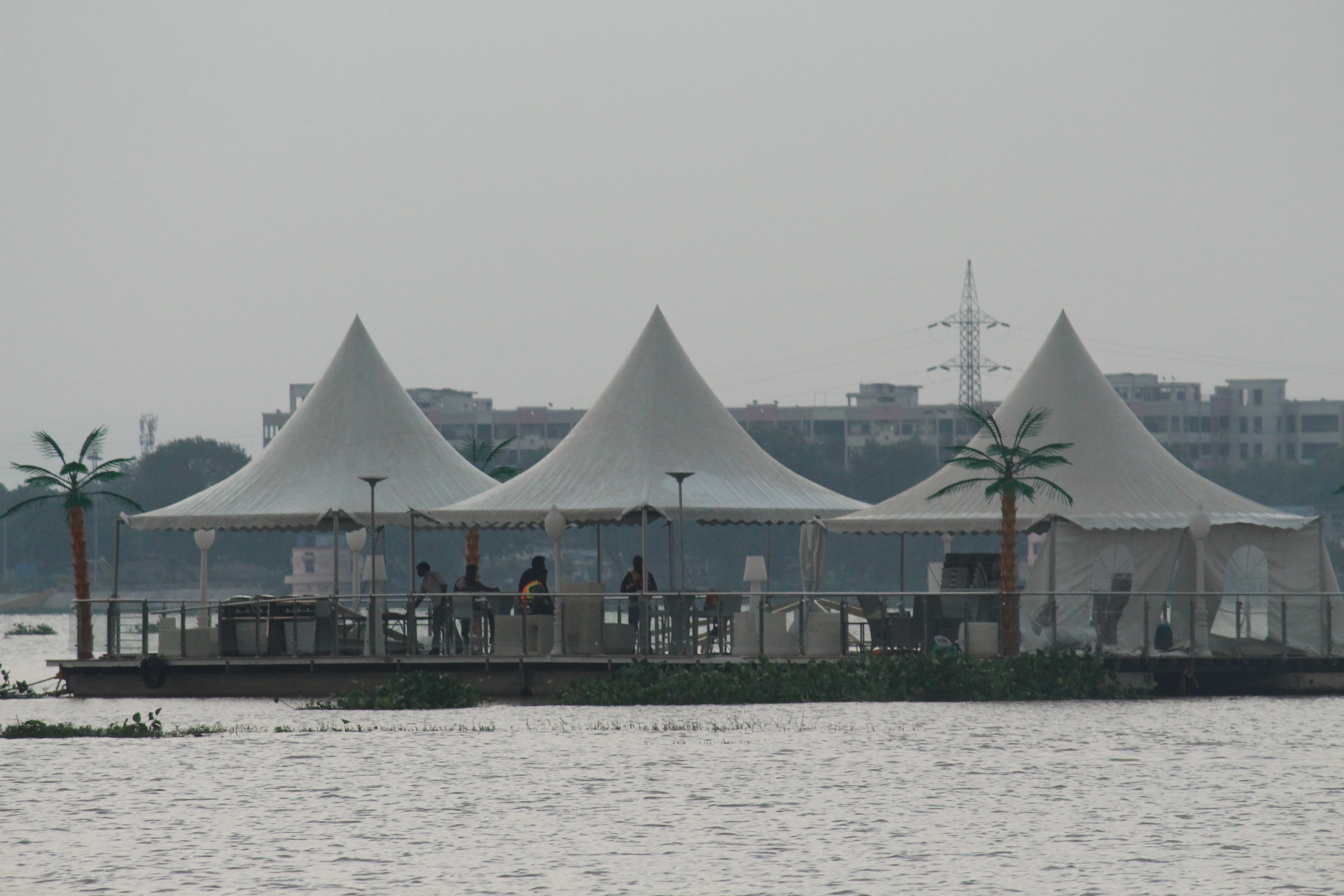
- Man Made Island near Bhavani Island
- Interactive map of Bhavani Island
- Location: Vijayawada, Andhra Pradesh, India
- Coordinates: 16.522780°N 80.573107°E
- Area: 133 acres (54 ha)
- Operator: APTDC

Bhavani Island situated in the midst of the Krishna River, at Vijayawada. It is located at the upstream of Prakasam Barrage and is considered one of the largest river islands in India, with an area of 133 acres (54 ha). It has a robotic dinosaur park, garden maze, mirror maze, golf and badminton simulator, cycling, etc.

== Etymology ==
The Kanaka Durga Temple is the abode of Goddess Durga. She is also known with another name as Bhavani and hence, the island is named Bhavani Island. The island is located in close proximity to the temple.

== Tourism developments ==
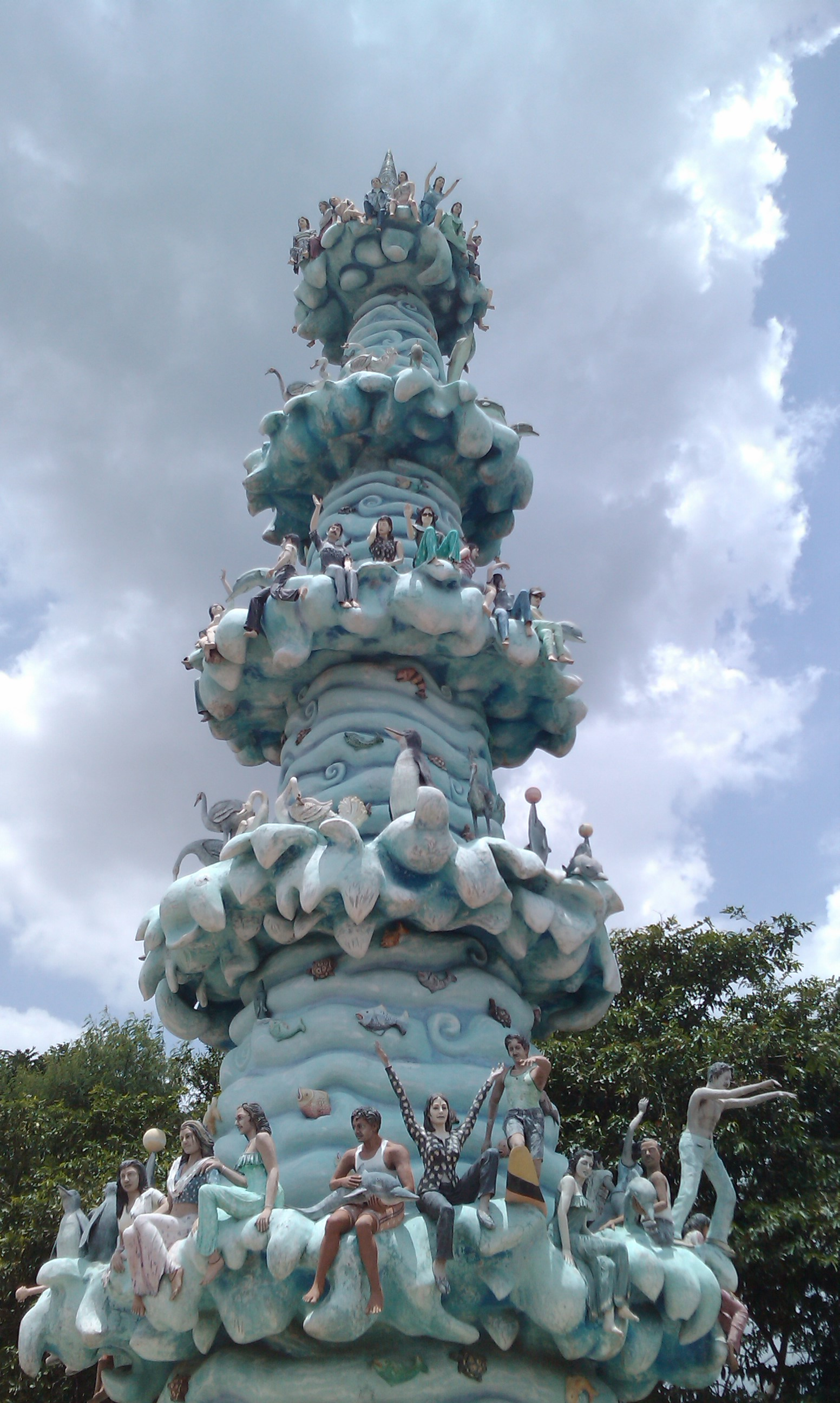
Tourist attraction at Bhavani Island

APTDC has taken initiatives to develop the place into a tourist spot. One such initiative is Shilparamam, an arts and crafts village project. It is also helpful for local artisans such as Kondapalli toy makers, weavers etc. APTDC has developed infrastructure on Bhavani Island to attract many tourists, which include sporting activities, resorts, rural museum, Berm Park, rope-way etc.
