= Alluri =

Alluri is a Telugu surname. Notable people with the surname include:

- Alluri Satyanarayana Raju (1913–1963) Indian independence activist and politician
- Alluri Sitarama Raju (1897–1924), Indian revolutionary
- Alluri Subhash Chandra Bose (b. 1940), Indian politician
- Shriram Alluri, Indian-born musician

== See also ==
- Alluri Seetarama Raju (film), 1974 Indian Telugu-language biographical film
- Alluri (film), 2022 Indian Telugu-language Action-Crime-Drama film
