= Inner Ring Road, Vijayawada =

Route information
- Maintained by APCRDA
- Length: 9.84 km (6.11 mi)

Location
- Country: India
- State: Andhra Pradesh

Highway system
- Roads in India; Expressways; National; State; Asian; State Highways in Andhra Pradesh

The Inner Ring Road is a ring road freeway in the city of Vijayawada in the Indian state of Andhra Pradesh. The project has a total stretch of 9.84 km (6.11 mi) with an estimated cost of ₹ 122.35 crores and is under the authority of APCRDA.

== Route ==
The route of the road starts at Gollapudi Y–junction of Krishna district and terminates at Ramavarappadu ring, connecting National Highway 16 and National Highway 65.
