= Alluri (musician) =

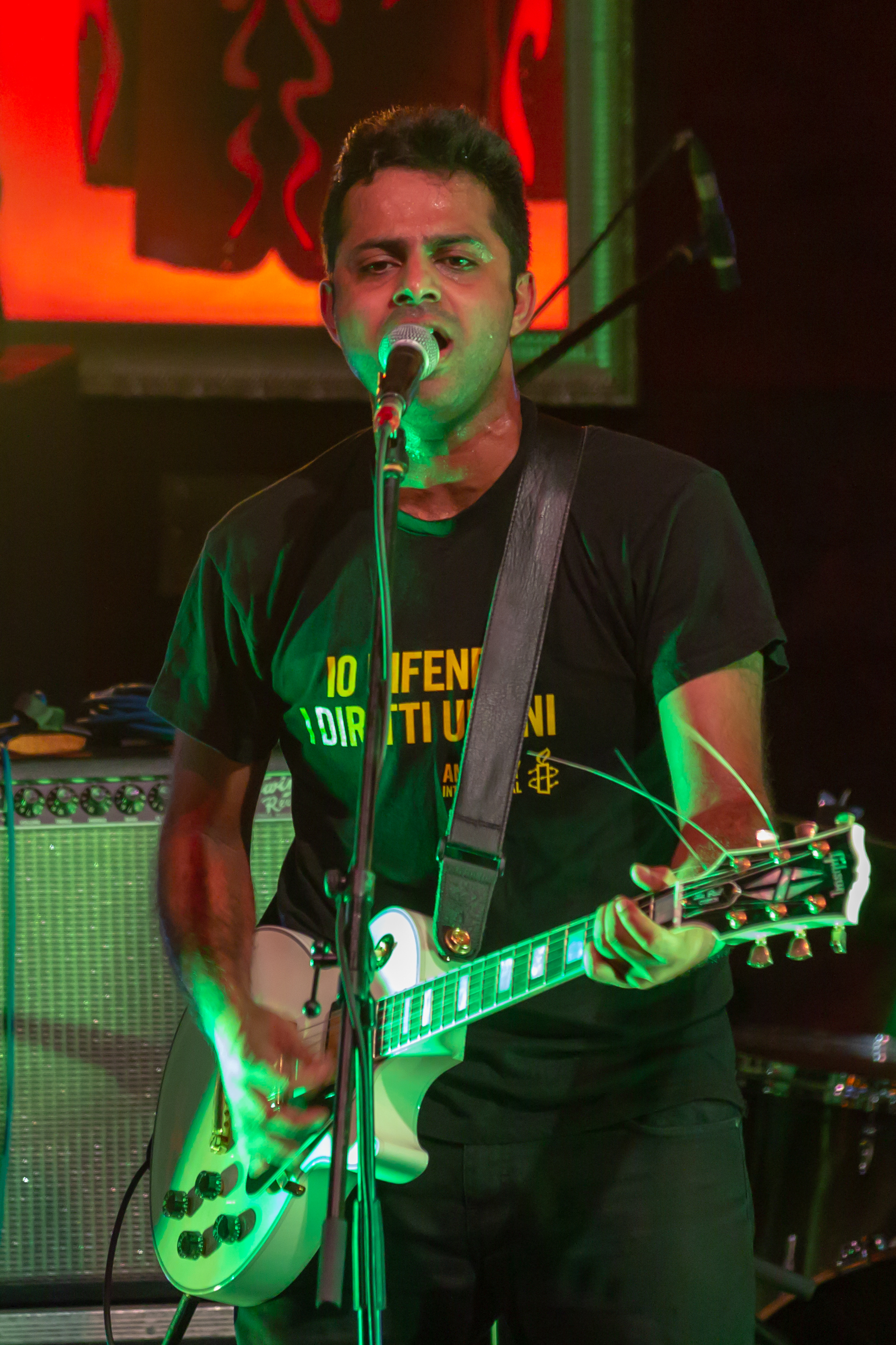
- Alluri performing at The Hard Rock Cafe in Mumbai in 2018

Background information
- Born: Shriram Alluri
- Origin: Hyderabad, India
- Genres: Indie rock, Indian Indie
- Years active: 2014–present
- Labels: Life Is Thus Records, Killing Moon Records
- Website: allurimusic.com

Shriram Alluri is an indie rock musician and songwriter from Hyderabad, India. He currently resides in the United Kingdom.

Alluri was raised in India, hearing local classical music, Bollywood and Tollywood music, and some Western popular music as a child, although he had no exposure to rock until his teens, at which point he began playing guitar. He relocated to the UK first as a student and then again in 2015 to record the album Man of Truth at Brighton Electric Studios. Alluri cites The Smiths, Joy Division, David Bowie, The Doves and Nick Cave as influences on his work.

Following the positive critical reception of Man of Truth, Alluri worked with the Grammy winning producer Tommaso Colliva (Muse, Jesus And Mary Chain, Franz Ferdinand) on the single Evari Kosam (For Who's Sake), his first recording to feature vocals performed in his native tongue, Telugu.

His 2018 single Don't Lose Touch With was recorded with Glen Matlock of the Sex Pistols after Matlock saw and tweeted a video of Alluri's live Telugu language cover version of Anarchy in the UK. When asked by Indian press as to what got him working with Alluri, Matlock said, "If somebody knows what they’re doing, they have some drive, and they’ve got a certain degree of accomplishment on their instrument, they kind of look alright. I think he’s got all of that. I find him interesting." Matlock produced the single, working with Alluri and Tommaso Colliva in Italy.

In interviews supporting the release of his 2018 Telugu language album O Katha: Tales of This Telugu Man, Alluri has stated that following the release of his 2015 album he experienced an identity crisis. Feeling he couldn't truly share his English language songs with his friends and family in India, he began to write songs in Telugu to re-inforce that aspect of his identity, with the songs reportedly coming to him in a creative burst. On writing Telugu language songs, Alluri has said, "When the British came to India they heard Telugu and called it 'the Italian of the east', because all words end with a vowel, not a consonant. These new songs, melodically, they’re influenced so much by the language". Alluri recorded the album in Italy working again with Muse producer/mixer Tommaso Colliva along with Italian musician Massimo Martelotta, of the cinematic Italo-funk band Calibro 35.

Alluri has made several notable live appearances in 2018 at events such as a stadium concert in Hyderabad, Tallinn Music Week, and a show with Glen Matlock at the Hard Rock Cafe in Mumbai. He has stated he has renewed his focus on songwriting and is working with producer Adrian Hall (Shakira, Depeche Mode, Anna Calvi) on new English language songs to eventually form a series of EPs and his third album.

== Critical reception ==
Alluri's debut album Man of Truth received favourable UK reviews and coverage in 2016 from notable sources including Q magazine, and the NME, alongside features articles in major papers, and favourable reviews and interviews appearing on various music websites.

In India, he has been praised in many of the country's largest newspapers for making authentic cross-cultural indie music, with feature articles and interviews having been published in media including The Times of India, The Hindu, The New Indian Express and the Deccan Chronicle.

== Discography ==
Studio Albums

- 2018 O Katha: Tales of This Telugu Man (Life Is Thus Records)
- 2015 Man of Truth (Life Is Thus Records)

Singles

- 2018 Baalyam (The Lost Irredeemable Magical Weirdness of Childhood) (Life Is Thus Records)
- 2018 Don't Lose Touch
- 2018 Naato Vastavaa (A Trip) (Killing Moon Records)
- 2016 Texture Composure (Life Is Thus Records)
- 2016 Evari Kosam (Killing Moon Records)
