= Gandhi Hill, Vijayawada =

Where a Gandhi memorial lies

Gandhi Hill
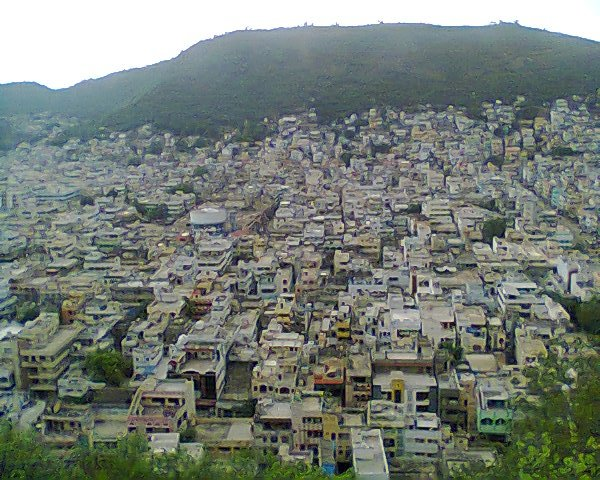
- View of city from Gandhi Hill, Vijayawada
- Interactive map of Gandhi Hill
- Location: Vijayawada, Andhra Pradesh, India
- Coordinates: 16.5198°N 80.6168°E

The Gandhi Hill (elevation 500 ft (150 m)) is a hill in Vijayawada, situated behind the Vijayawada railway station in the Tarapet area. A Gandhi Memorial, built on this hill, is the first in the country to have seven stupas. The hill is also popularly known by the name of Gandhi. The hill was formerly known as ORR hill.

== Memorial ==
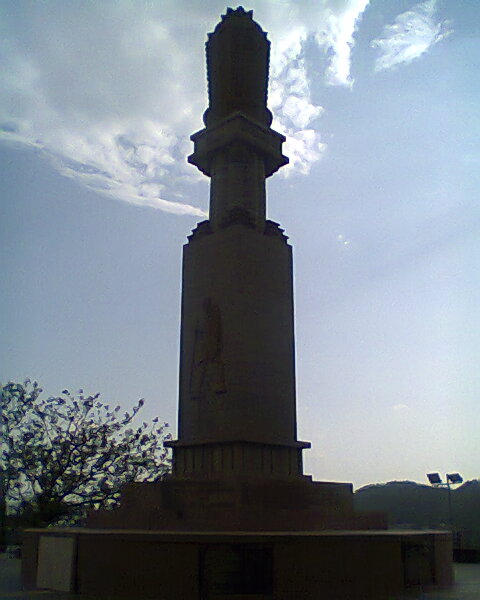
Gandhi memorial stupa

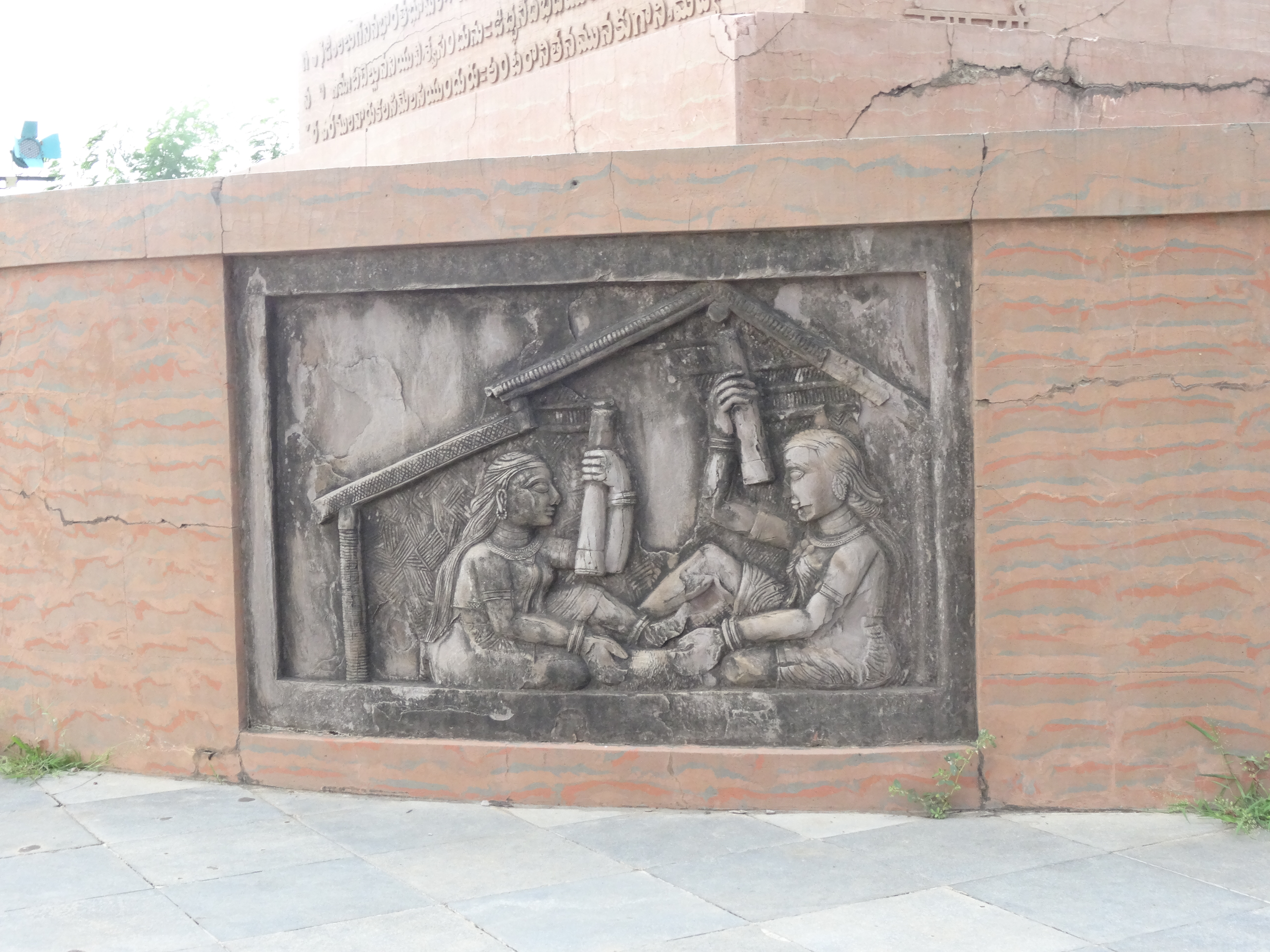
Inscriptions on Gandhi statue at Gandhi hill.

Gandhi Hill is considered as a monument of Indian Independence struggle and pays homage to Father of the nation, Mahatma Gandhi. The Gandhi Hill Memorial has a stone slab with inscriptions of Gandhi quotations. The facility has a library and a planetarium, and offers a show on the father of the nation. On 6 October 1968, a stupa 52 ft (16 m) tall was unveiled by former President of India, Dr. Zakir Hussain. There are also seven tall pillars, each 150 m (490 ft) tall.

== See also ==
- List of tourist attractions in Vijayawada
