= Alluru, Mudinepalli mandal =

Alluru
- Village
- Interactive map of Alluru
- Location in Andhra Pradesh, India Alluru (India)
- Coordinates: 16.457886°N 81.183018°E
- Country: India
- State: Andhra Pradesh
- District: Eluru
- Elevation: 7 m (23 ft)

Population (2011)
  - Total: 5,372

Languages
  - Official: Telugu
- Time zone: UTC+5:30 (IST)
- PIN: 521181
- Telephone code: 08678

Alluru is located in Eluru district of Andhra Pradesh, India.
