= Kanaka Durga Temple =

Hindu Temple in Andhra Pradesh, India

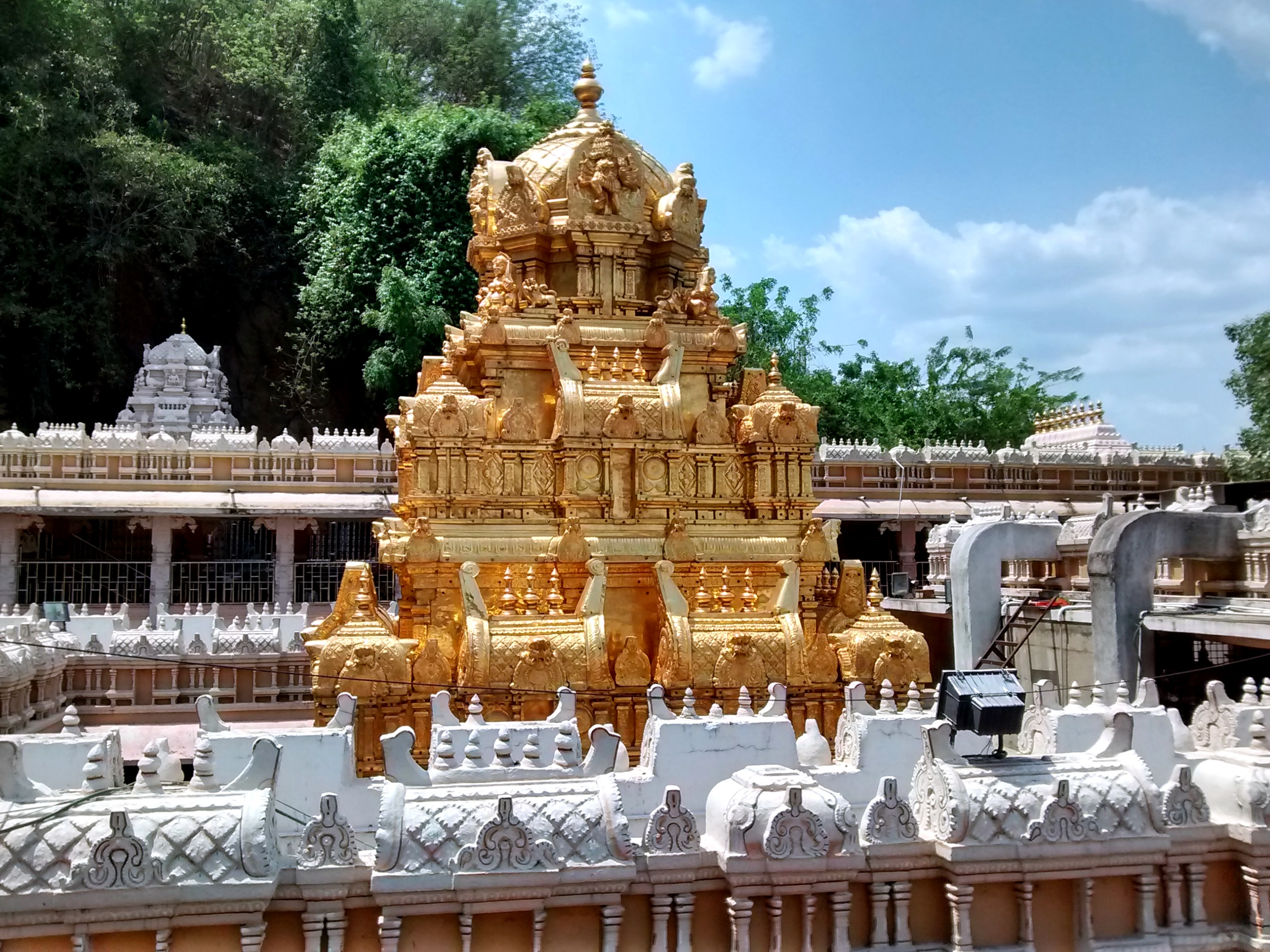
- Kanaka Durga Temple

- Location in Andhra Pradesh Location in India

Religion
- Affiliation: Hinduism
- District: NTR
- Deity: Kanaka Durga
- Governing body: Sri Durga Malleswara Swamy Varla Devasthanam

Location
- Location: Vijayawada
- State: Andhra Pradesh
- Country: India
- Coordinates: 16°31′8.50″N 80°37′17.38″E

Architecture
- Type: Dravidian

Website
- kanakadurgamma.org

Kanaka Durga Temple, officially known as Sri Durga Malleswara Swamyvarla Devasthanam, is a Hindu temple dedicated to Kanaka Durga. The deity in this temple is also popularly referred as Kanaka Durga. The temple is located in Vijayawada, Andhra Pradesh, India on the Indrakeeladri hill on the banks of Krishna River. Kaalika Purana, Durgaa Sapthashati and other Vedic literature have mentioned about Kanaka Durga on the Indrakeelaadri and have described the deity as Swayambhu, (self-manifested) in Triteeya Kalpa.

== Goddess legend ==
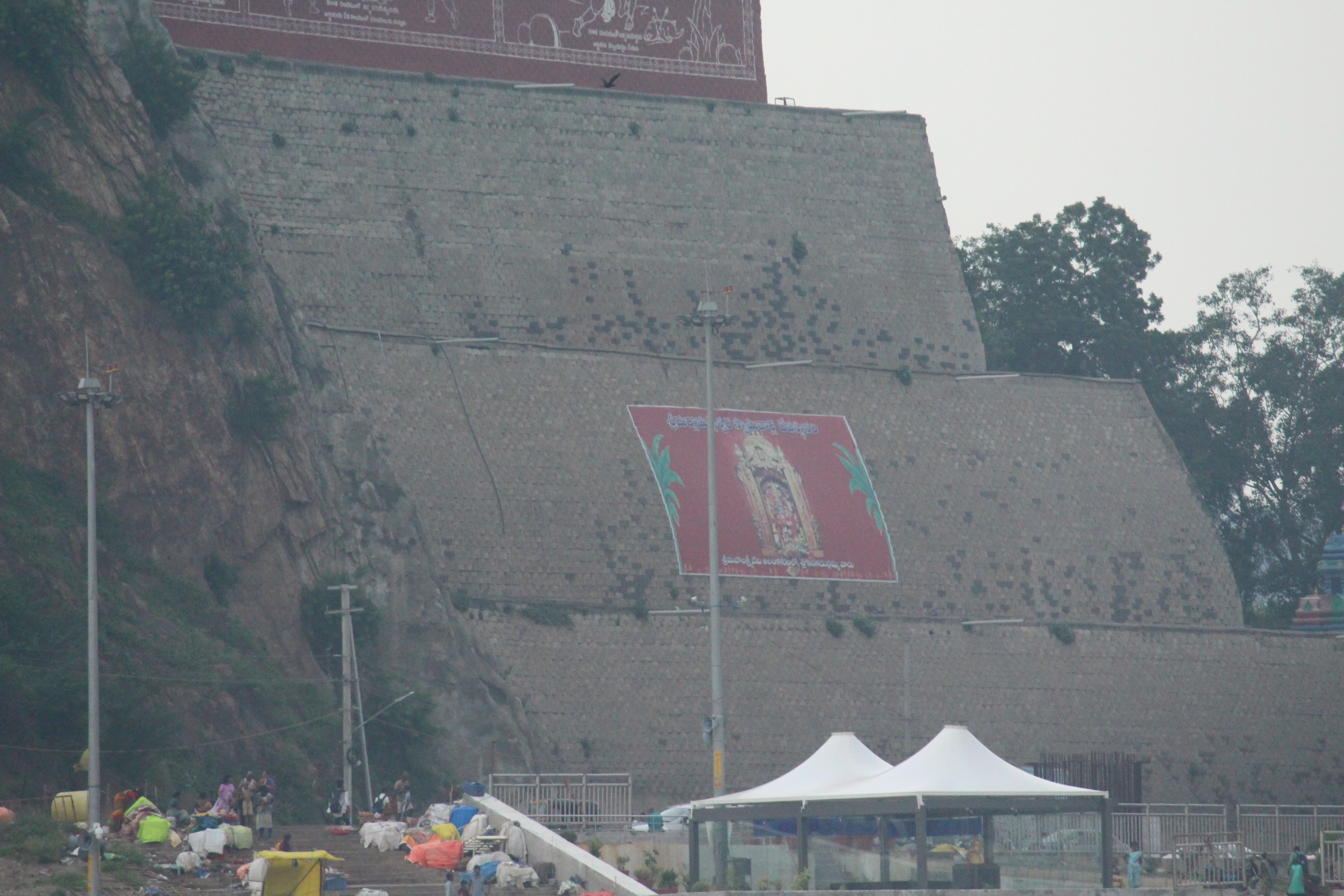
View of temple Basement

The popular legend is about the triumph of Kanaka Durga over the demon King Mahishasura. It is said that the growing menace of demons became unbearable for the natives. Sage Indrakila practiced severe penance, and when the goddess appeared the sage pleaded to her to reside on his head and keep a vigil on the wicked demons. As per his wishes of killing the demons, Durga made Indrakila her permanent abode. Later, she also slayed the demon king Mahishasura freeing the people of Vijayawada from evil.

At the Kanaka Durga temple, the enchanting 4-foot-high (1.2 m) icon of the deity is bedecked in glittering ornaments and bright flowers. Her icon here depicts her eight-armed form, each holding a powerful weapon, in a standing posture over the demon Mahishashura and piercing him with her trident. The goddess is the epitome of beauty.

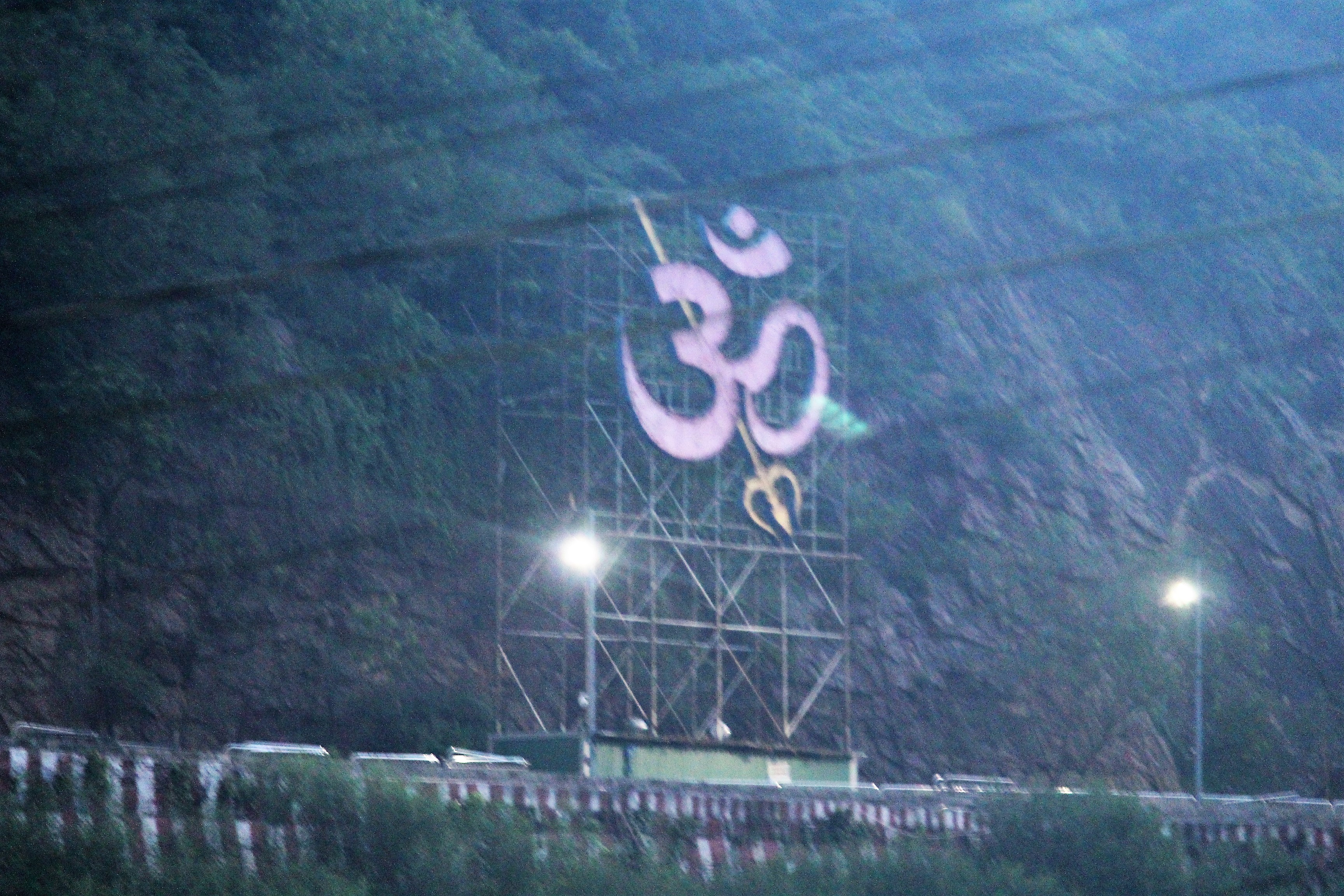
Om Symbol at Kanaka Durga Temple.

== History ==
A Telugu inscription dated 1229 CE from Chola era and found in Veligandla Village in Prakasam District recorded a donation to the God Bejawada Malleswaradeva at Indrakiladri, known as Dakshina Varanasi was made by Podukayuri Siddayadeva and Sivamagi Maraya for the merit of their chief Siddaraju, alias Trilochana Pallava, a Telugu Pallava King.

== Sub-shrines ==
Other than Kanaka Durga, more deities are housed within the temple complex. Those deities include Malleswara Swamy, Nataraja and Kartikeya, Valli and Devasena. Malleswara and Nataraja Swamy's shrines are located at the northeast corner of the temple, while Subramanya, Valli, and Devasena are located on the north side of the main temple. Hanuman is the kshetrapalaka (guardian) of the temple, and behind him, there is Aparajitha Devi. Both are located on the temple's backside and in the direction facing Devi. When you go up the hill, there will be Shrines of Abhaya Anjaneya and Kamadhenu Devi.

== Worship ==
Kanaka Durga Temple is synonymous with Vijayawada. It is mentioned in the sacred texts.

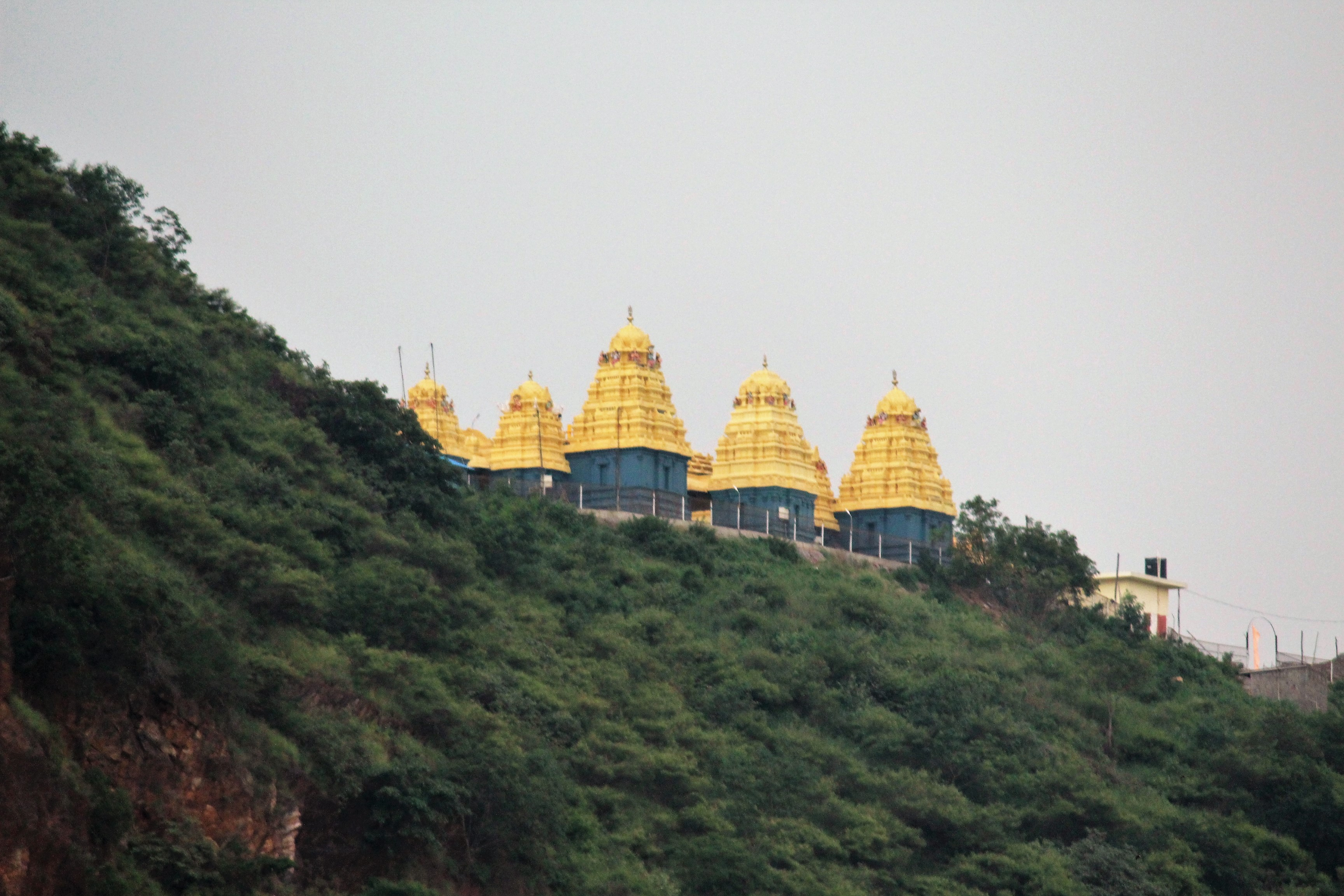
View of Temple Complex from Prakasam Barrage

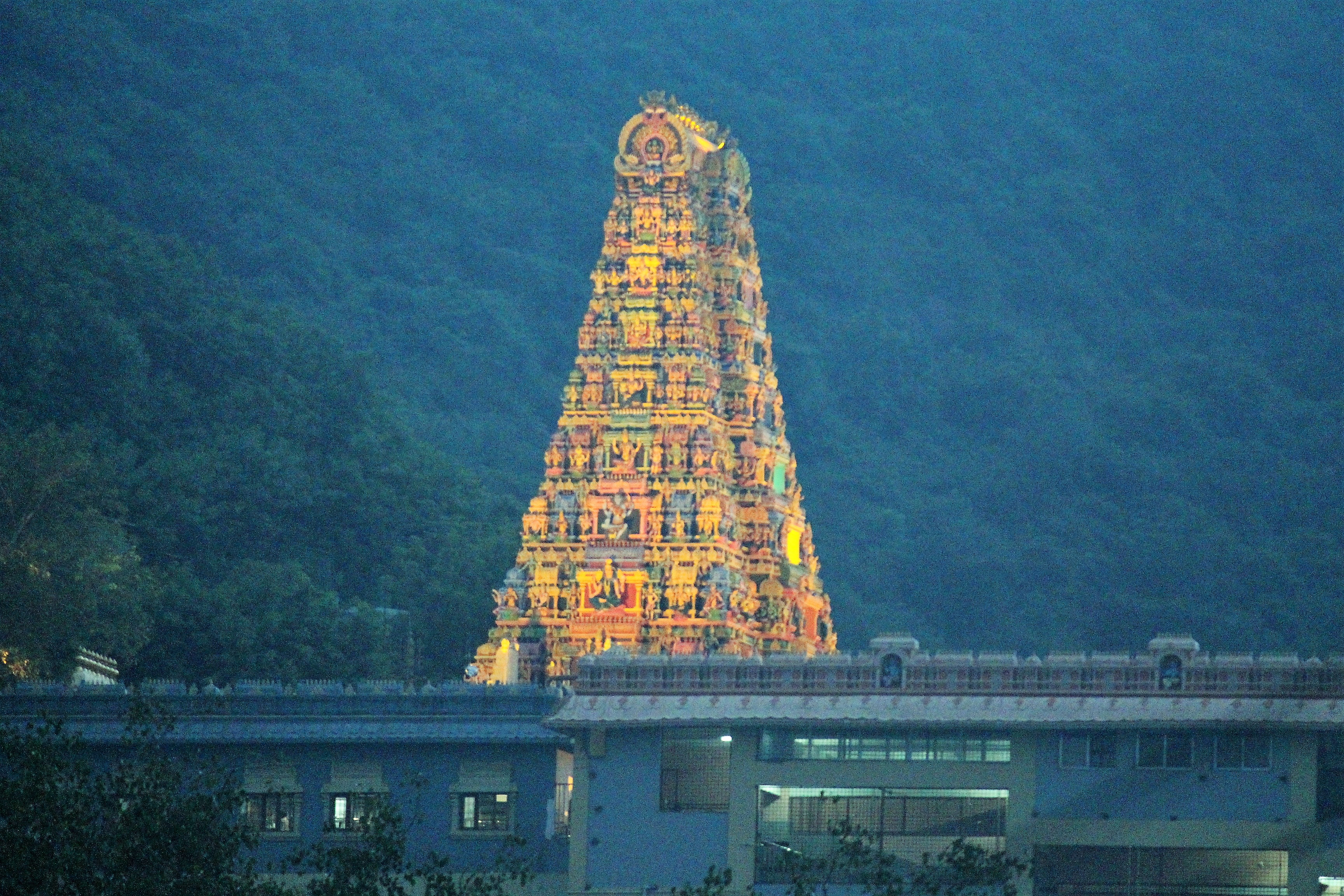
A nearby temple viewed from Prakasam Barrage on night lights

It is mentioned in the Hindu scriptures that the deity in the Sri Kanaka Durgamma Devasthanam is regarded as Swayambhu or self-manifested, hence considered very powerful.

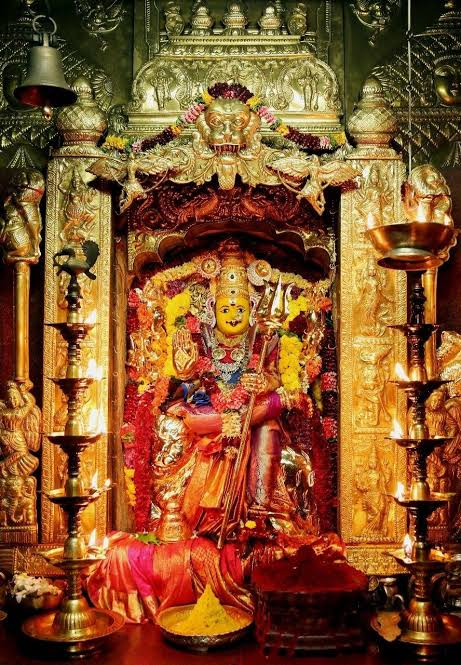
Moola Virat of Sri Malleswara Swamy Temple, Sri Kanka Durga Ammavaru

On a daily basis, the temple opens at 2.50-3.00 AM. Then, at 3:00 AM, the Suprabhata Seva takes place which was introduced in 2018 waking up the Goddess. This is followed by Abhishekam and Khadgamala Pooja. Then, the Goddess is decorated with silk sarees and ornaments as a part of the Vastram Seva. Naivedyam is offered at least three times a day, with the main offering made at 12.15 PM in the noon. Everyday Archanas are performed during which the pujaris read the Sahasranama and Ashtottara Namavali of the Goddess. The Periodical sevas include the Pournami Maha Pooja conducted on every day a full moon occurs with special offerings and alamkarams. The Saraswati Yagam is dedicted to the Goddess for education and career purposes. Finally, the Laksha Kumkumarchana is the offering of Kumkuma (Vermilion) to the Goddess while chanting her names over 1,00,000 times. Special Pooja, Archana and Abhishekam are also performed to Malleswara Swamy, a form of Lord Shiva.

During the month of Sraavanam, Varalakshmi Vratam is performed on all Fridays with special reverence. More than 20,000 people attends the celebrations during this month.

Special pujas are performed during Dasara also called Navaratri. The festival of Dasara is celebrated here in this temple every year. A large number of pilgrims attend the colourful celebrations and take a holy dip in the Krishna River. Special Alankaramas and Naivedhyamas are offered to the Goddess. The Goddess is worshipped with special rituals such as Chandi homam and the Utsava murthy of Durga Devi is taken in processions around the temple premises, followed by the Teppotsavam or boat festival. Ten forms of Kanaka Durga are worshipped in the period of 10 days (Nine days of Navratri and one day of Dussehra). The ten forms are:

1. Swarna Kavachalankrita Durga
2. Bala Tripurasundari
3. Annapurna
4. Gayatri
5. Lalita Tripura Sundari
6. Saraswati
7. Mahalakshmi, she is adorned as Mahalaxmi on the seventh day
8. Durga
9. Mahishasura Mardini
10. Raja Rajeswari Devi

Inscriptions of different dynasties are found in the temple.

== Transport ==
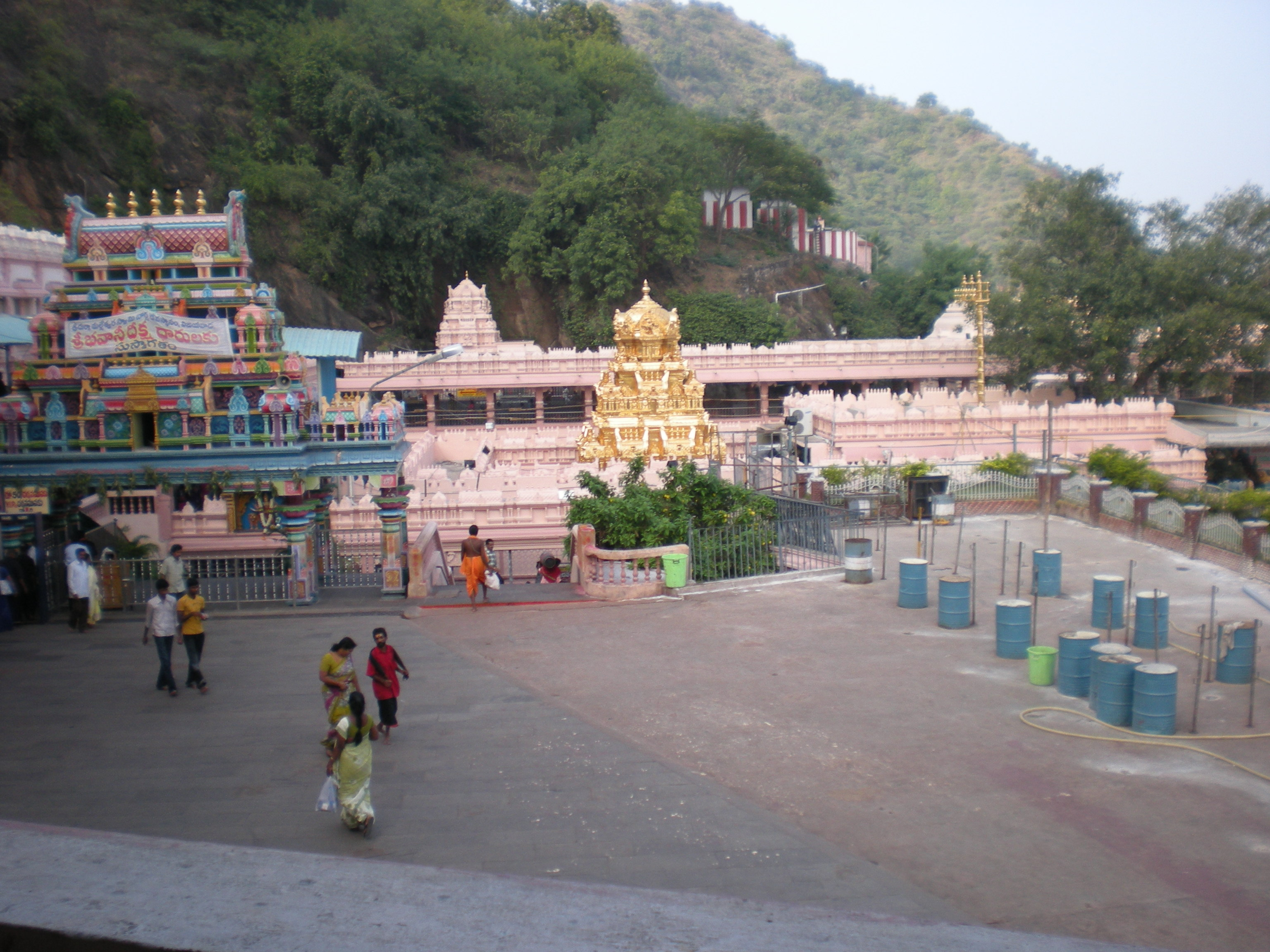
Durga Temple-Vijayawada

Located in the heart of Vijayawada city, the temple is just a 10 minutes drive from the railway station and Bus stand and about 20 km from airport. Temple buses are available at bus stand and railway station for every 20 minutes. Vijayawada is located 275 kilometers from Hyderabad. It is well connected by road, rail and air from all parts of the country.

== Sakambhari festival ==
The annual Sakambhari festival is celebrated in Ashadha month with deep piety and ceremonies. During the three-day-long festival, Kanaka Durga assumes the form of Sakambhari or Banasankari Amma of the Banashankari Amma Temple, wherein prayers are offered to the Goddess to bless all vegetables, agriculture, and food so that they are plentiful and capable of nourishing the multitude. Sakambari festival is celebrated from Sukla Paksha Thrayodashi to Purnima, of Ashadha month every year. Goddess Sakambhari temple is situated in Shivalik Mountain range near to Saharanpur in Uttar Pradesh.

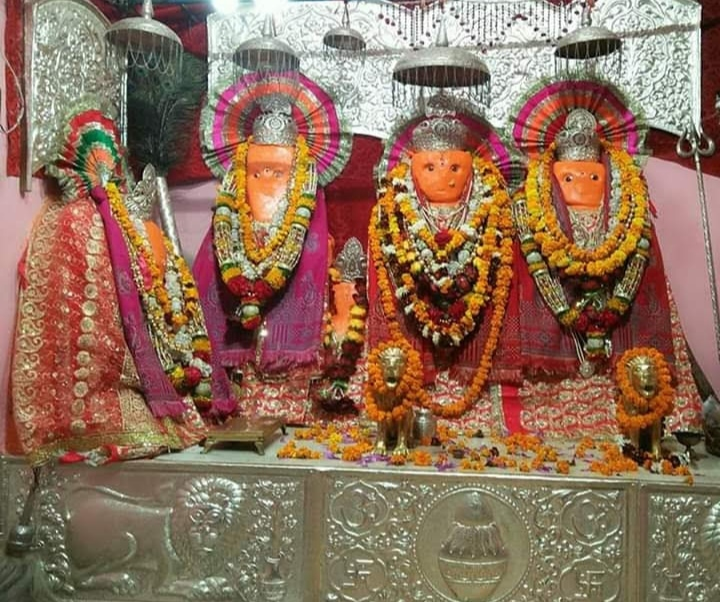
Shaktipeeth Shakambhari Saharanpur

== See also ==
- Lakshmi Narasimha Temple, Mangalagiri
- Amararama
