= Moin-Ud-Daula Bahadur =

Nobleman and minister of Hyderabad state

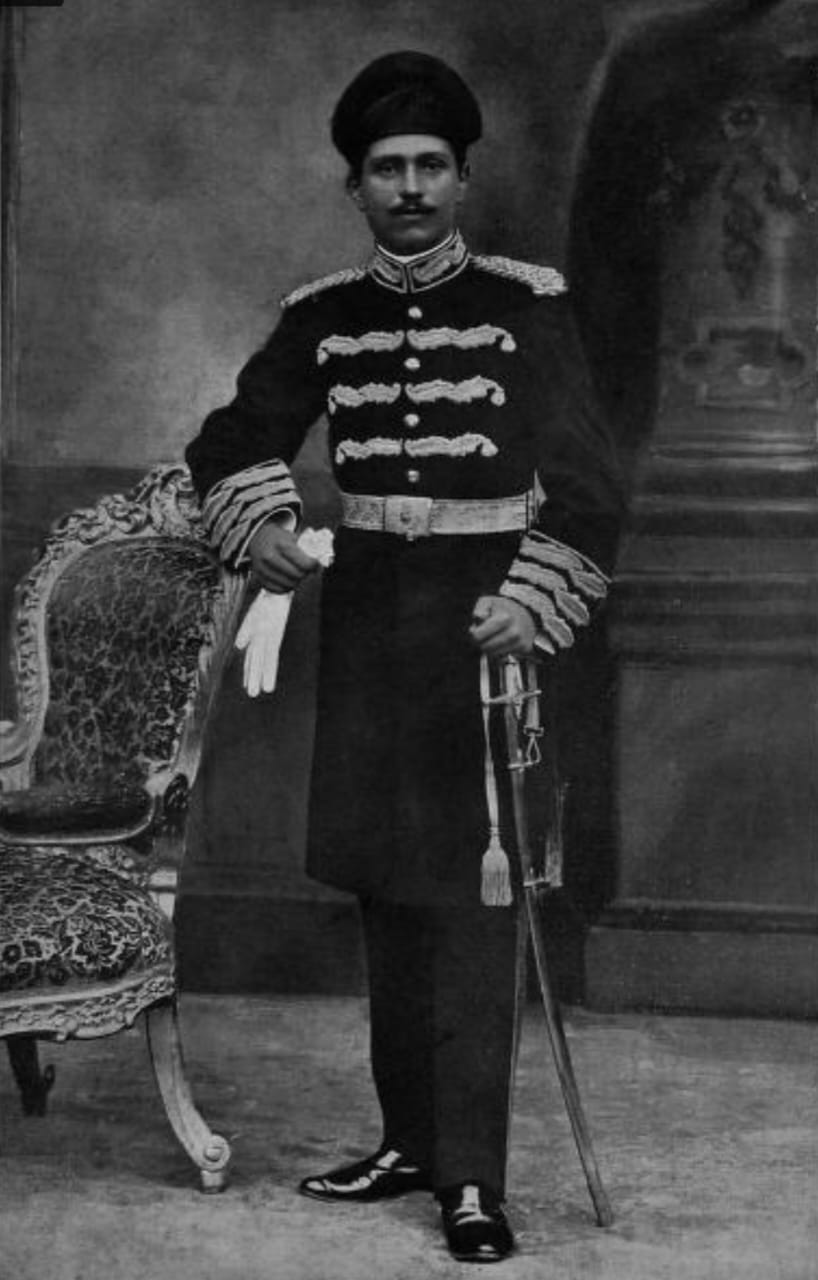
- Born: Nawab sir Muhammed Moinuddin Khan; 15 June 1891; Basheer Bagh Palace
- Died: 25 September 1941 (aged 50)
- Resting place: Paigah Tombs, Santosh Nagar, Hyderabad.
- Education: MEC
- Successor: Nawab Zaheer Yar Jung
- Children: Nawab Ifteqar Uddin Khan, Nawab Iqbal Uddin Khan, Nawab Badar Uddin Khan, Nawab Ahmeduddin Khan and more
- Father: Asman Jah
- Relatives: Osman Ali Khan (Cousin) Sultan-ul-Mulk (Cousin)
- Family: Paigah family
- Awards: Delhi Darbar Silver 1911, Silver Jubilee 1935, Coron 1937, Nizam Silver Jubilee 1937

Amir-e-Paigah-e-Asman Jahi, Moin-ud-Daula Bahadur Innayath Jung, commonly known as Sir Nawab Muhammed Moin Uddin Khan (born at Basheer Bagh Palace in 1891) was an Indian nobleman, member of the Paigah Nobility, and the Amir of the Asman Jahi Paigah, one of the 3 great Paigahs of Hyderabad State. The Paigah Nobility was the second most powerful family in Deccan Hyderabad State maintaining their own court and army bound with Asaf Jahi dynasty by matrimonial relationship, Moin-ud-doula and his father Asman Jah was one of those fortunate individuals to whom it has been given by fate to write their names large in the annals of their country, Moin-ud-doula's father Asman Jah who served as co-regent and Prime Minister of Hyderabad created several marvelous architects throughout the city maintained his army court in his domain Shamshabad, was granted the title of Order of the Indian Empire,

Moin-ud-Daula was educated at Nizam College MEC. He was the Minister of Industry from 1923 to 1924 and later retired to join the army of the Asaf Jahi dynasty as army deputy from 1924 to 1927. He was granted the title of Innayat Jung in 1919 and the title of Amir-e-Paiagh Asman Jahi in 1927, Paigah Amirs held the honorary monarchal (standard) behind the Nizam. Moin-ud-Daula was one of the most trusted close allies of Mir Osman Ali Khan he was also part of the Executive Council of H.E.H. the Nizam of Hyderabad, he was also adviser and counselor to Nizam and he was the only person to have his court, army, and domain he also possed the largest estate in the entire state of Hyderabad State formally known as Deccan 2nd to non but Nizam, Moin-ud-was also one of the richest nobles in the east at that time, tales of his father's achievement and wealth are well known and his loyalty to the Asaf Jahi dynasty, there countless book in which it is described by Noble Englishmen about both Moin-ud-Daula and his father Asman Jah as exceptional people of noble character and people of sincerity, piety, and honor,

== Career ==
Nawab Moin-ud-Daula Bahadur founded Moin-ud-Dowlah Gold Cup Tournament he was very fond of cricket and founded Patron Hyderabad Cricket Association 1934–1941.he was also President of Saroornagar Cricket Club, and was honored with K.C.I.E after serving in the Asaf Jahi dynasty army.

He was the Minister of Industry from 1923 to 1924; his contribution to the education system and business industry is greatly appreciated.

== Medal of Honour ==
Nizam's Silver Jubilee (1937)

Delhi Durbar Silver (1911)

Silver Jubilee (1935)

Coron (1937)

== Estate and Palaces ==
Basheer Bagh Palace was owned by Nawab Moin-ud-doula and also his father Asman Jah's Asman Garh Palace and one of the most famous Asman Jah Devdi, Saroornagar Devdi, and many properties in Somajiguda, Shamshabad, Basheerbagh, Vikarabad and countless many more villages, areas and the district of Moinabad, Ranga Reddy which was also named after Nawab Moin-ud-Daula Bahadur.

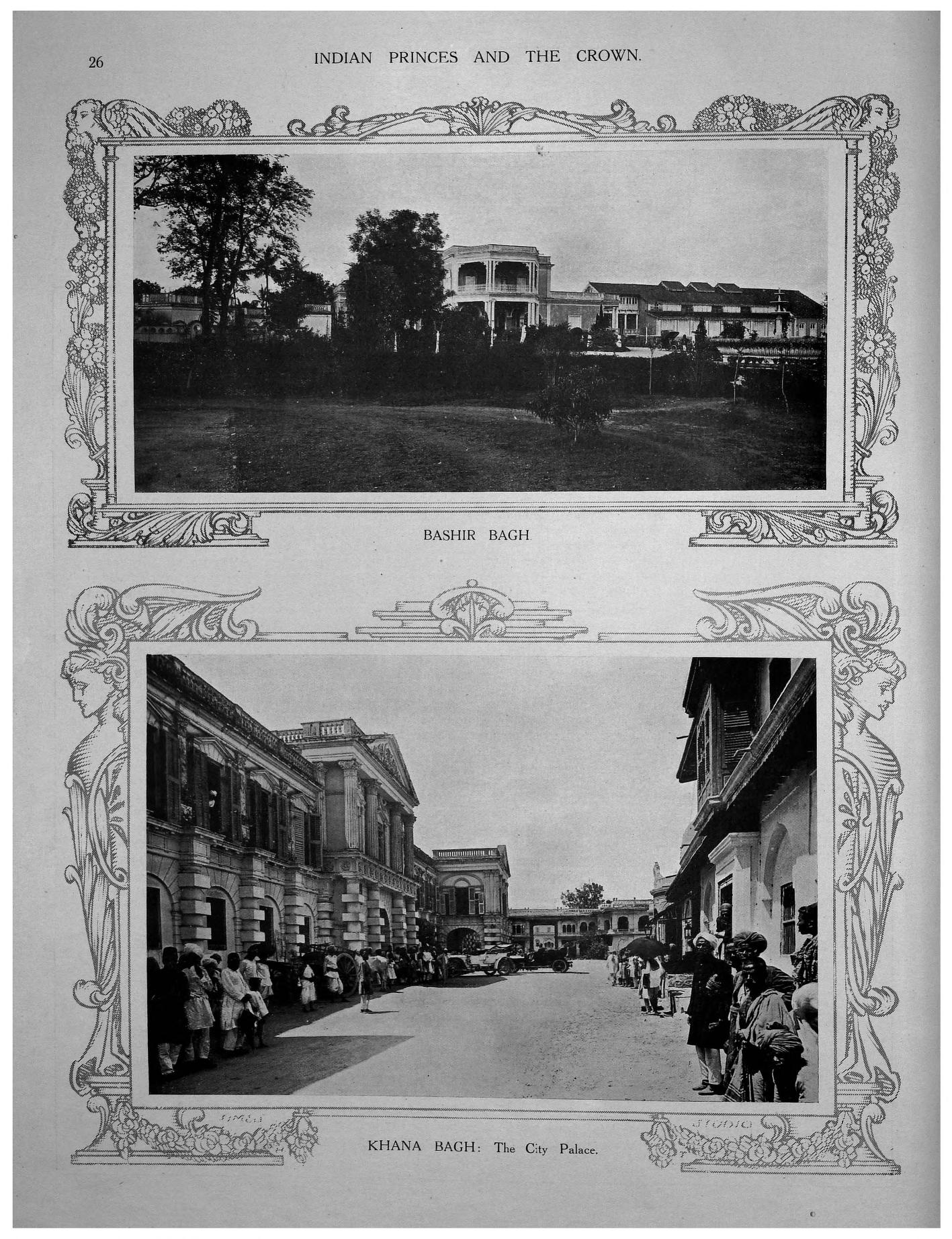
Basheer Bagh Palace & Asman Jah Palace

== Personal life ==
Nawab Sir Moin-ud-Daula Bahadur had 14 sons and 7 daughters; he was the grandson of Afzal-ud-Daulah and son of Asman Jah, his mother was a princess from a powerful and wealthy state, which granted him considerable influence. Moin-ud-Daula had several sons and daughters, including Nawab Zaheer Yar Jung (who lived in Paigah House in Begumpet), Nawab Ifteqar Uddin Khan, Nawab Bahseer Jung, Nawab Ahmeduddin Khan and Nawab Iqbal Uddin Khan (who lived in Sarooragar Palace).

He has several grandsons and granddaughters, some of whom are famous personalities:

Nawab Fakhr Uddin Khan, Nawab Wali Yar Jung, Nawab Hyder Uddin Khan, Nawab Khaja Moinuddin Khan, Sahebzadi Nikhat Unnisa Begum and Sahebzadi Iqbal Unnisa Begum. Mohammed Mohiuddin Khan, Ifteqar Uddin Khan, Nawab Ahmeduddin Khan

After the annexation of Hyderabad State into India the Paigah estate became one of the biggest high profile and longest running civil suit for an estate in the country known as C.S 7 of 1958 with 10,000 acres of land, palaces, villages and assets worth more than 50 to 70 thousand crores and jewellery worth millions.
