= Basheerbagh =

Basheer Bagh
- City Center
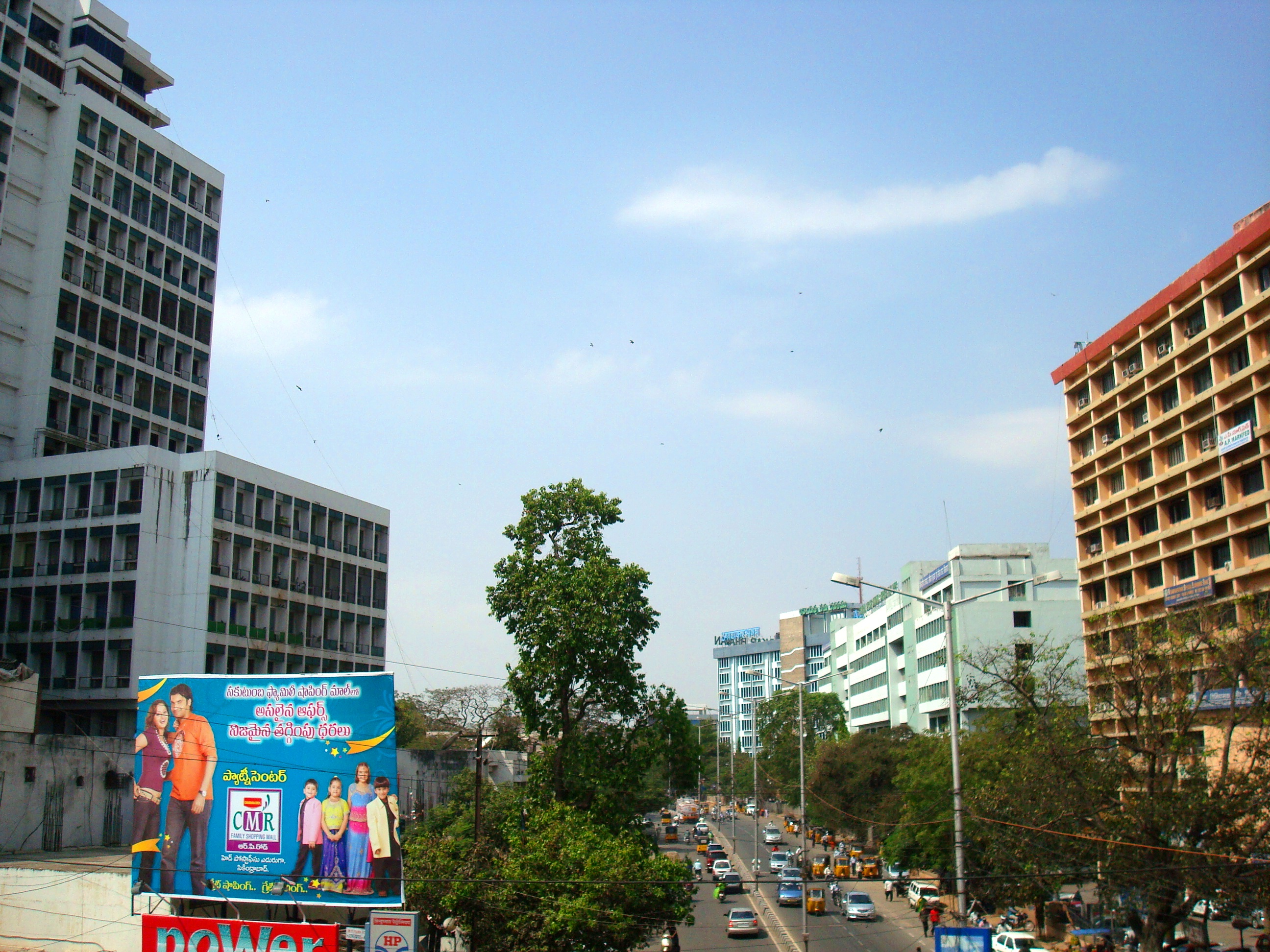
- Basheerbagh skyline

- Location in Hyderabad, India Basheer Bagh (Telangana) Basheer Bagh (India)
- Coordinates: 17.399782°N 78.476615°E
- Country: India
- State: Telangana
- District: Hyderabad
- Metro: Hyderabad
- Established: 1880
- Named for: Bahir-ud-Daula, Nawab Asman Jah Bahadur

Government
  - Body: GHMC

Languages
  - Official: Telugu, Urdu
- Time zone: UTC+5:30 (IST)
- PIN: 500029
- Lok Sabha constituency: Secunderabad
- Vidhan Sabha constituency: Khairtabad
- Planning agency: GHMC

Basheerbagh is a neighbourhood of importance in Hyderabad. Now it is a commercial and business centre. The area's importance has increased because of its close proximity to other bigger commercial areas such as Abids, Koti, Nampally and Himayat Nagar. The well-known Bashir Bagh Palace was located here. The neighbourhood is also close to Hussain Sagar Lake.

== History ==
Basheerbagh is named after Bashir-ud-Daula Nawab Sir Asman Jah Bahadur, who served as Prime Minister of Hyderabad (1887 to 1894). The Bashir Bagh Palace was built by him in 1880.

== Commercial area ==
Basheer Bagh serves as an important business and administrative center in Hyderabad where there exist many Jewellery shops, shopping centers, and multi-story commercial centers like Babu Khan Estate and Khan Lateef Khan Estate. Some of the major government offices situated here are the Income Tax Department (Ayakar Bhavan), office of the Hyderabad City Police Commissioner, Central Goods & Service Tax office, and Telangana Tourism booking center. In the past, Basheer Bagh had some cinema theaters like Skyline and Sterling.

== Education ==
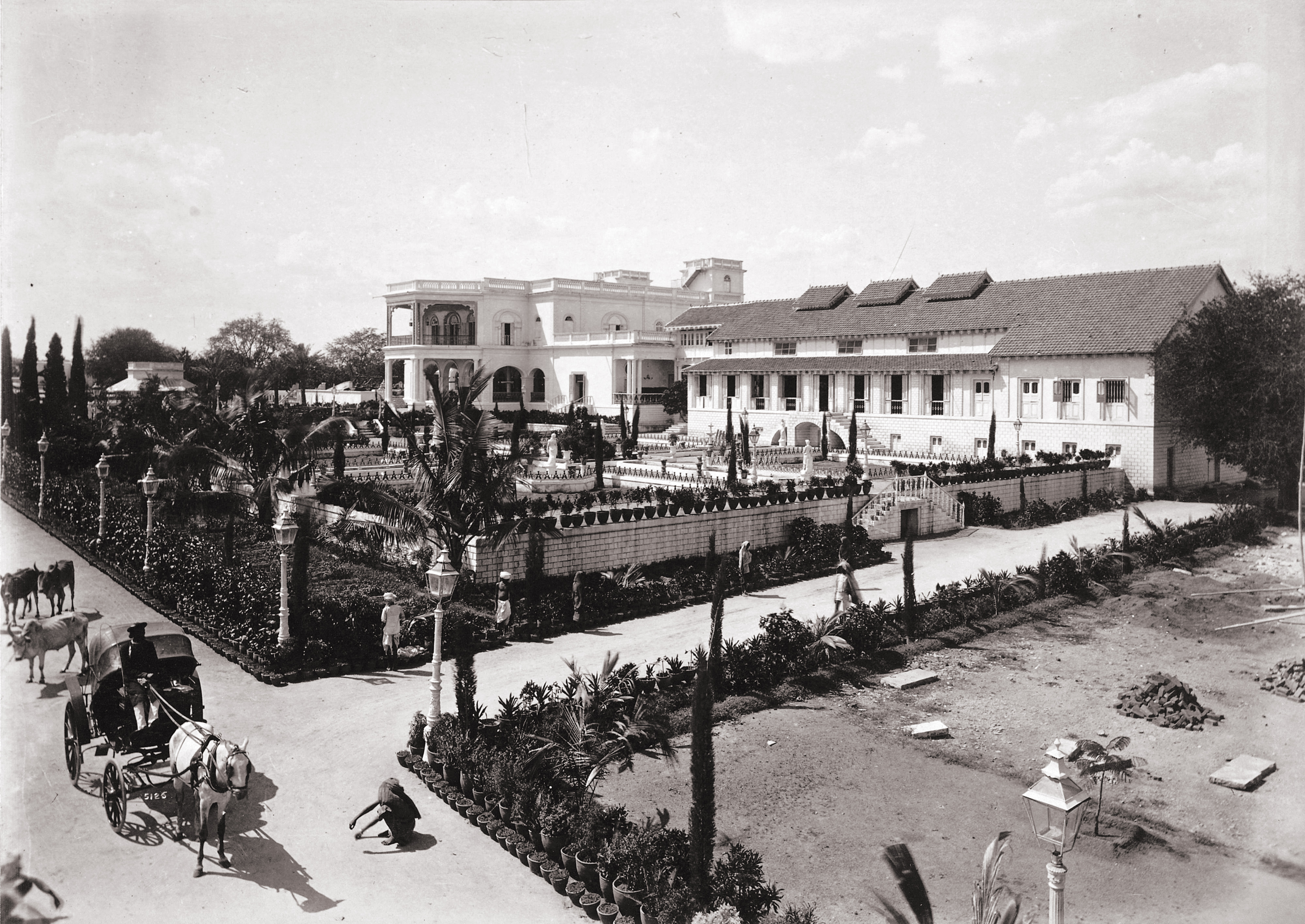
Bashir Bagh Palace, photographed by Lala Deen Dayal circa 1880

The well known Nizam College and club is located in this suburb.

== Sports ==
Basheerbagh was a sports hub and the multipurpose L.B Stadium which is used for football and athletics is located here. It was previously called as Fateh Maidan, because the handing over of Hyderabad to the Indian Army had happened here. Earlier it was used to host international cricket matches. An indoor stadium is also present here used for Badminton and Tennis. Presently they are not used much and Gachibowli has become the sports hub of the city.

Matches hosted by the Indian Cricket League ICL led to increased activity at the stadium and restored the operation of its floodlights, improving evening visibility in the surrounding area after a period without stadium lighting.

== Public transport ==
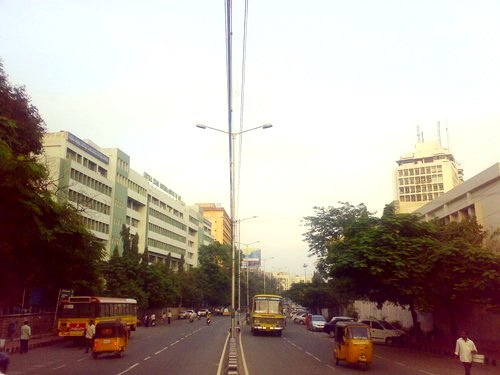
Basheerbagh main road

TGSRTC connects Basheerbagh to other parts of Hyderabad and Secunderabad. Autos and taxis are common forms of public transport here. The nearest Hyderabad Multi-Modal Transport System train station is at Nampally which is a kilometer away from Basheerbagh. The nearest metro station is lakdikapool metro station

== Landmarks ==
The landmarks of the city are:

- Lal Bahadur Shastri Stadium
- Babukhan Estate, one of the earliest high rise buildings of Hyderabad
- Police control room
- Old Gandhi Medical College
- Hyderabad Nursing Home
- Madhava Reddy Memorial Flyover
- Police Commissioner's office
- Income Tax Department office (Aaykar Bhavan)
- Meenakshi Elysia, one of the tallest buildings in Hyderabad
