= M.H.S. Ansari =

High Court of India judge

M.H.S. Ansari (March 20, 1943 - December 3, 2023) is a former judge of High Court of India. He was the judge of Andhra Pradesh High Court and judge of the Calcutta High Court.

== Early life and education ==
He completed his B.Sc., LL.B, and bachelor's degree in Science from Nizam College, Hyderabad (1963). He obtained his Law Degree from Osmania University (1965).

He was enrolled as an advocate in January 1966. On 2 May 1995, he was elevated to a Judge of the High Court of Andhra Pradesh. He was the judge of the Calcutta High Court from 14 November 1997 and after serving for seven years he was again transferred to the High Court of Andhra Pradesh 6 December 2004.

About Father-in-Law (Anwarulla Pasha)

Pasha & Company:

The firm was started by Late Anwarulla Pasha of Hyderabad and J.B. Dadachandji from New Delhi with G.B. Pai and P.K. Kurien from Cochin in 1965. The main partner Anwarulla Pasha was a third generation lawyer, his father, Abdulla Pasha being the Advocate General in the state of Hyderabad.

Anwarulla Pasha started his practice in Bombay in a large firm of lawyers where N. A. Palkiwala, J.B. Dadachandji and himself were colleagues. At a very young age he was appointed Legal Advisor to Salar Jung – III and on Salar Jung's death in 1949 was instrumental in getting the Salar Jung Museums Act, passed in Parliament. He was the Legal Advisor of The Nizam – VII of Hyderabad from the early 1950s until the Nizam died in 1967. After which he became the Legal Advisor of HEH The Nizam – VIII till he retired and moved away to settle down in Portsmouth, UK. Anwarulla Pasha was the Legal Advisor for all the major companies based in Hyderabad also the counsel for the State of Andhra Pradesh to represent the state in the Krishna and Godavari River water dispute in Delhi before the Bachawat Commission.

Later on the firm was recast and M.H.S. Ansari, who later on was elevated as Judge to the A.P. High Court and Calcutta High Court and Asadulla Pasha and G.S. R. Anjaneyulu were inducted as partners.

The firm is now infused with young blood and has Omar Pasha and Amera Pasha as partners with Asadulla Pasha as the senior partner.

The firm is based at Hyderabad and acts for and on behalf of its Clients throughout the State of Andhra Pradesh as well as handling work in the Supreme Court at Delhi.

Apart from the three partners there are 5 advocates working with M/s Pasha and Company, which is into extensive practice in all spheres of law.

The firm is into varied litigation and non-litigation practice on the civil and criminal side with a strong presence in corporate law.

In memory of Justice MHS Ansari, the Calcutta High Court also held an obituary on Dec 21, 2023.
