= Paigah Tombs =

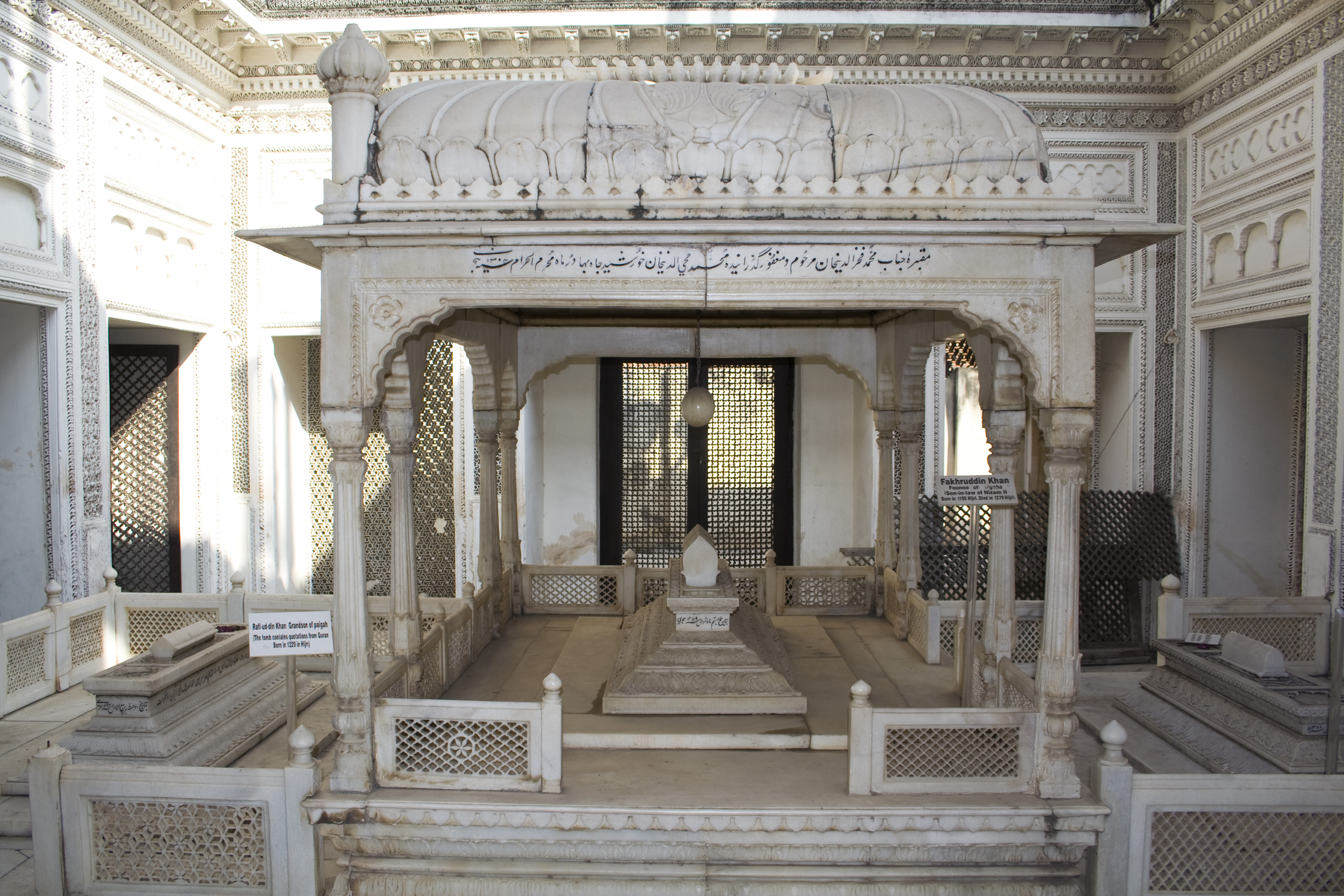

- Location within Hyderabad

General information
- Location: Hyderabad, (India)
- Coordinates: 17.3439°N 78.5041°E

Paigah Tombs or Maqbara Shams al-Umara, are the tombs belonging to the nobility of Paigah family, who were fierce loyalists of the Nizams, served as statespeople, philanthropists and generals under and alongside them. The Paigah tombs are among the major wonders of Hyderabad State which are known for their architectural excellence as shown in their laid mosaic tiles and craftsmanship. Since it was Amir-e-Kabir H.E. Nawab Sir Khursheed Jah Bahadur who built the Paigah Tombs, he gave special preference in terms of construction to his immediate family. Of all the arches at Paigah Tombs, it is only the arch of his family's tomb that is bigger compared to the others. The entire necropolis was built earlier then the architecture would have been the same for all the tombs but instead in terms of architectural beauty, the tomb of Nawab Sir Khursheed Jah's family was given special preference. The largest arch and the double maqbara inside known as "Mahajar" cannot be seen inside any other tomb and also to mention the beautifully decorated stucco work in the tomb of Lateefunnisa Begum Saheba (Grandmother of Sir Khursheed Jah) is not found in any other tomb. The tombstone of Lateefunnisa Begum Saheba, on which is already mentioned was built by Nawab Sir Khursheed Jah Bahadur. "Lateefunnisa Begum Saheba Jid'de Mohammed Mohiuddin Khan Khursheed Jah Tayyari ye Mohammed Mohiuddin Khan Khursheed Jah Bahadur." The word "Jid'de" over here would mean Grandmother of Sir Khursheed Jah Bahadur and "Tayyari'ye Mohammed Mohiuddin Khan Khursheed Jah Bahadur" would mean "Prepared by Khursheed Jah Bahadur." Inside this tomb are the graves of Nawab Sir Khursheed Jah Bahadur's immediate family members. Shahzadi Hussainunnisa Begum (Wife), Shahzadi Hashmatunnisa Begum (Mother), Amir-e-Kabir Nawab Mohammed Rasheeduddin Khan Bahadur (Father) and Hussaini Begum (second wife of Nawab Rasheeduddin Khan). The Paigah's necropolis is located in a quiet neighbourhood 4 km southeast of Charminar Hyderabad, at Phisal banda suburb, down a small lane across from Owaisi Hospital near Santosh Nagar. These tombs are made out of lime and mortar with beautiful inlaid marble carvings. These tombs are 200 years old and represent the final resting places of several generations of the Paigah Nobles.

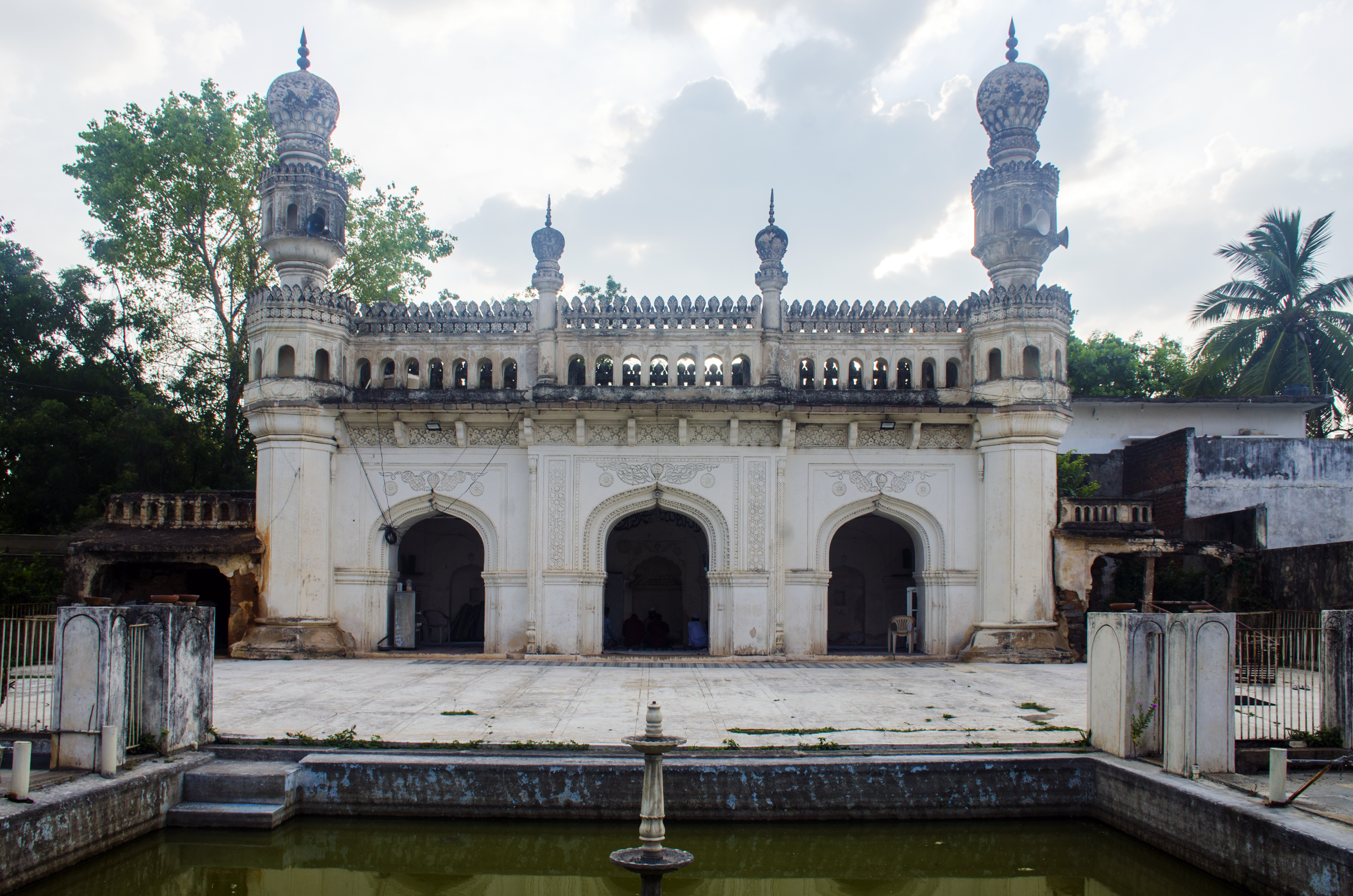
Mosque at Paigah Tombs complex

At first, Paigah Tombs may look deserted and uncared for, but on a closer look, you will find the place quite enthralling. With marvellous carvings and motifs in floral designs and inlaid mosaic tile works, the tombs are exquisite to walk around. The tombs and their walls are delicately carved and enclosed in pierced marble facades, some of them in rows and some with beautifully carved screens and canopies.

The place is easily approachable and is set amidst a labyrinth of concrete houses built around the 30 acres of property in which the tombs are nestled. They are almost obscure and a marvellous piece of artistry in marble lost in time. The Indo-Islamic architecture is a mix of both the Asaf Jahi and the Rajputana styles of architecture. You will also see décor in fabulous stucco work, representing the Mughal, Persian and Deccan styles too.

== History ==
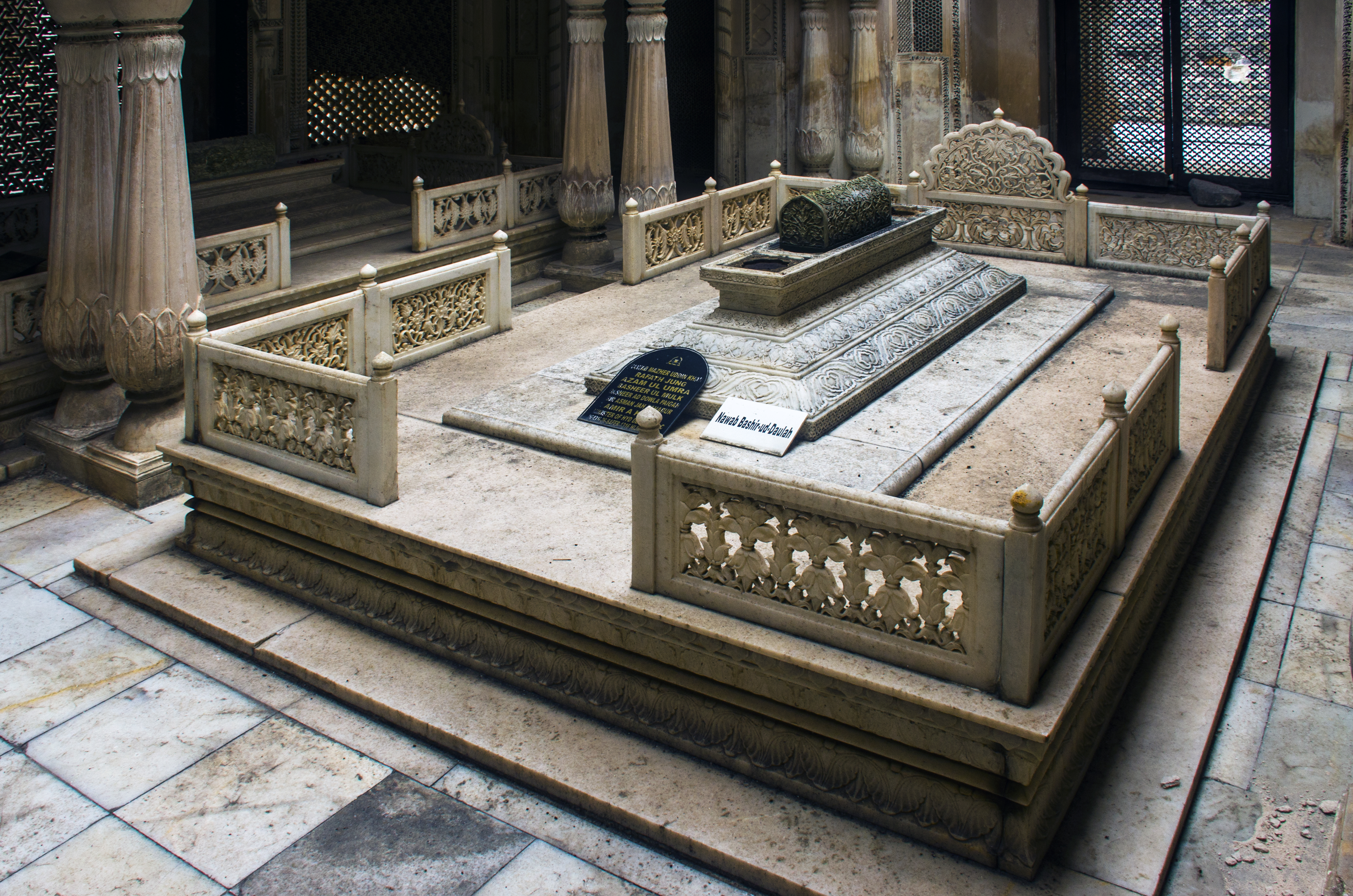
An ornate tomb at Paigah Tomb Complex

The noble families of Paigah, during the 18th century were the most influential and powerful families of the Princely State of Hyderabad’s aristocracy are the descendants of the Omar bin Al-Khattab, Islam’s second caliph, comprising the area of their Jagirs to 4000 sq. miles. Their ancestor was Abdul Fateh Khan Tegh Jung who came to Deccan with Asaf Jah 1st and founded the Paigah nobility. He rendered service to the second Nizam, who ruled between 1760 and 1803 and received the highest position of Commander in chief with the title of Shams-ul-Umra, meaning the sun among the nobles. Their distinguished family background, their valuable services to the Nizam's generation and also matrimonial alliances with the ruling Nizams made them the highest ranking nobles next only to the Nizams. They Constructed several palaces in the City notable among them were Asman Garh Palace, Khursheed Jah Devdi, Vicar-ul-Umarahi palace and also the famous Falaknuma Palace, they were believed to be wealthier than the average Maharajah of the country and were the only ones to have the privilege of maintaining their own court, palaces, as well as their own private armies, which often numbered several thousand. Abdul Fateh Khan Tegh Jung was the first who buried in 1786 at the place which later became the family Maqbara built as per the generations of the members of their families, mostly renovated by his son Amir-e-Kabir I (in the 1880s some additions were made by Sir Asman Jah, Sir Khurshid Jah, and Sir Vikar Ul Umra)., the tombs of several generations of the Paigah nobles include Abul Fatah Khan Shums ul Umra I to Shums ul Umra v, Sir Asman Jah, Sir Khursheed Jah, Sir Vicar-ul-Umra, Sultan ul Mulk, Lady Vicar ul Umra, Lady Khurshid Jah, Lady Asman Jah, Moin ud Dowla, Zaheer yar Jung, Zayd Yar Khan and other members of the Paigah Family.

The Paigah tombs are near to the Dargah of Barhana Shah Sahab are very delicate and splendor works of art in Mughal Provinces Style. Though these stunning tombs are strewn over 35-40 acres, tombs of the Paigah as who had married daughters of the Nizams and their spouses are confined to a two-acre site. It is this enclosure which is now known as Paigah tombs., are in the shape of chaukhandis with latticed panels but open to sky. As all the Nizam's tombs till the ascending to the throne by 7th Nizams were exposed to the sky, to emulate the tomb of Mughal emperor Aurangazeb, of whom the Nizam were the governor. So the Paigah nobles preferred their graves to be without any roof. It is as per the simple tenets of Islam. The surrounding beautiful structure of walls have latticed panels with geometrical and floral design. The delicate polished stucco work and Jali is art is tic which represents the general style of the period.

=== At The Mausoleum ===
The sublime beauty of Paigah Tombs has enchanted many through the years. It lies just 6 km from Hyderabad making the location easily accessible. A cranked up signage stating the name will welcome you. As you step inside the compound you will be instantly transformed into an era where beauty and craftsmanship went hand in hand, even if it was to follow them in the after-life! Each step you take around the mausoleum will bring you closer to the exemplary craftsmanship with elaborately carved canopies and marble inlaid floral designs. The most fascinating aspect about the destination is that none of the designs are repetitive. Each of the Paigah noble’s tombs features something uniquely different and part of the wonder is in discovering the differences in the carvings.

It is a treasure house of intricately designed latticework. It fills one with such wonder to see the delicately carved wooden doors and window screens done in jaali (perforated) work. Even though there is little to seek beyond the tombs, one can spend hours here walking through its passages and enclosed areas. Photographers must come here to watch and capture the shadows which play on each tomb and its rich carvings.

== Architecture and design ==
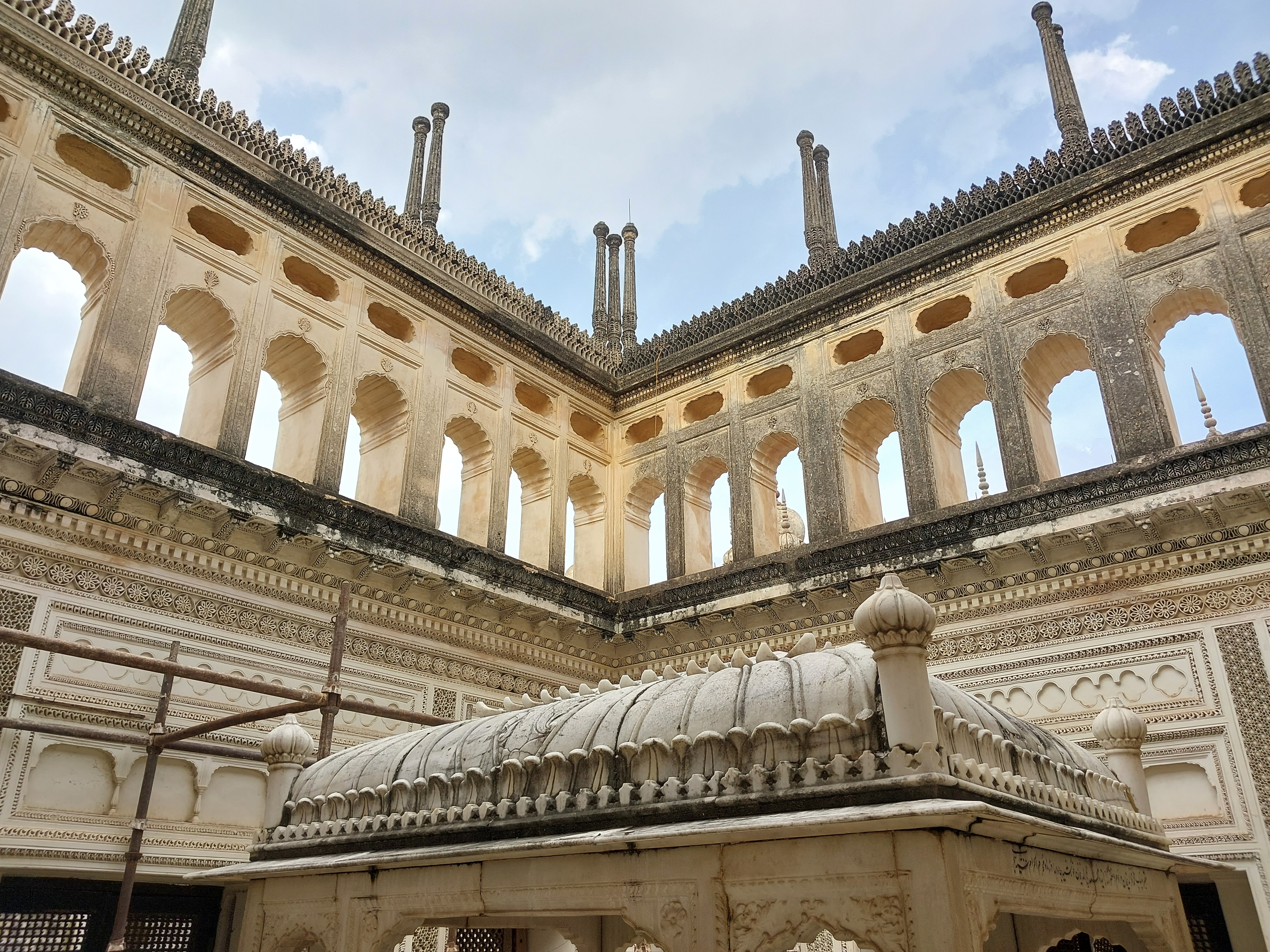
Architectural Style of Paigah Tombs

The style of architecture of the Paigah Tombs is an amalgam of Mughal and Moorish styles resulting in a unique synthesis. The crypts, made of lime and mortar, have intricate marble inlay work and stucco reminiscent of Granada and Seville in Spain. These tombs are magnificent structures, decorated in stucco work, and represent the Moghal, Greek, Persian, Asaf Jahi, Rajasthani and Deccani style of architecture which are unique specimens of extraordinary artistry that is ardently visible in the wonderfully inlaid mosaic work. The geometrical designs in the Paigah Tombs are unique and are perforated with screens with great craftsmanship. Which has been constructed by Amir e Kabir I (Details of which are available in the diary of the Viceroy and the letter written by the then Resident J.C Bayley to Nawab Salar Jung the then prime minister Informing him about important details regarding tombs on 10 March 1882 after the death of the Co-Regent and Amir E Kabir III Nawab Rashid uddin Khan Bahadur informing Sir Salar Jung that all the three Amirs wanted to perform the Urs of their Grand Father and Great Grand Father on the same day, he advised The Prime minister to see to it that all three Paigahs perform the Urs ceremony at the same time to maintain protocol and to avoid a situation in which who would perform first could be discussed)Nawab Sir Asman Jah Bahadur, Sir Khurshid Jah and Sir Vikar Ul Umra later made some additions which included the chowkhandis of marble added by Sir Khurshid Jah (this was taken up when Sir Khurshid Jah ordered 18 Chowkhandis over the shrines of Important holy saints all over India. The last addition was made by Lady Vikar ul Umra for herself and her son Nawab Sultan ul Mulk Bahadur Beside the tomb of Amir e Kabir III Nawab Rashid uddin Khan Bahadur. It is in Hyderabad. These structures are specimens of remarkable artistry showing itself off in exquisite inlaid mosaic work. Local people claim that the geometrical patterns of the sculptural features of these tombs are unique and not found anywhere in the world.

Restoration work is being undertaken by the Aga Khan Trust for Culture to restore the missing architectural features, replace faulty repairs, and fix structural cracks.

== The Tombs ==
The detail of the stuccowork on these structures is intricate. They have become extremely popular because of the geometrical features carved on them. Apart from the geometrical designs, the floral designs, trellis marble fencing, and canopies are also very intricate and beautiful.

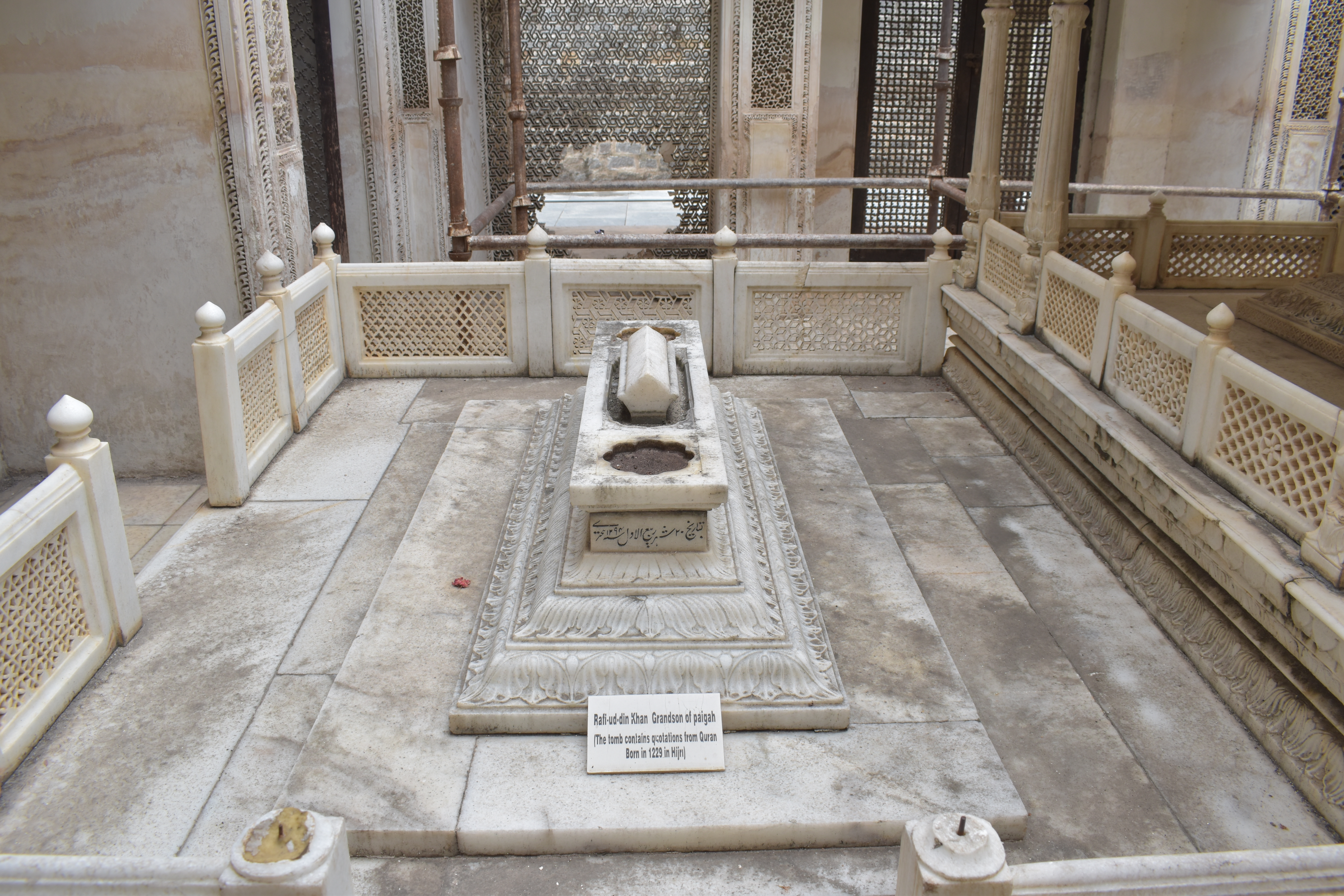
Tomb of the Paigah Family member

The Tomb of Asman Jah and Begum Khurshid Jah attract maximum number of tourists. The structures are made of marble and were once adorned with precious and semi-precious stones which changed colours with the change of seasons. The Tombs are enclosed by a wall which is ornamented with lattice work and exotic floral and geometric designs. Each wall is done up differently with fruits, drums, serpents, flowers, vases, etc.

The mausoleums themselves feature differing designs but all have exemplary craftsmanship, utilizing elaborate canopies and marble fences done in trellis-work that are made up of geometric and floral designs. Arches fringed by smaller semi-circular arches–a feature unique to India–are also employed. Each of the Paigah noble’s tomb feature something unique different and part of the wonder is discovering each of the difference. All of these are housed by walls that are intricately designed by a wealth of latticework and exotic designs.

== Restoration ==
The Paigah Tombs complex in Hyderabad is currently undergoing a major restoration effort aimed at returning the site to its original grandeur. The conservation work is being carried out by the Aga Khan Trust for Culture (AKTC) in partnership with the Department of Heritage Telangana, and is supported by the U.S. Ambassadors Fund for Cultural Preservation (AFCP) for the restoration of six of the tomb structures. The project has been timed for completion by the end of 2025.

To restore the complex to its original grandeur, more than a hundred minarets have been meticulously reconstructed, following traditional construction practices observed on-site. The conservation of monuments at the Paigah Tombs complex is being carried out by the Aga Khan Trust for Culture in partnership with the Department of Heritage Telangana, with support from the U.S. Ambassadors Fund for Cultural Preservation for six of them.

The funding support from the U.S. AFCP amounted to USD 250,000 and targets six tombs built in the 18th and 19th centuries. The work includes documenting decorative stucco, lime-mortar jaali screens (which were discovered to be made of terracotta tiles and iron cores) and replacing earlier inappropriate repairs (such as cement patching) with traditional materials and techniques.

The restoration initiative also encompasses ancillary site improvements including better landscaping, visitor amenities, walking paths, signage and lighting, all designed to safeguard the necropolis and enhance public access while preserving the heritage fabric.

== Gallery ==
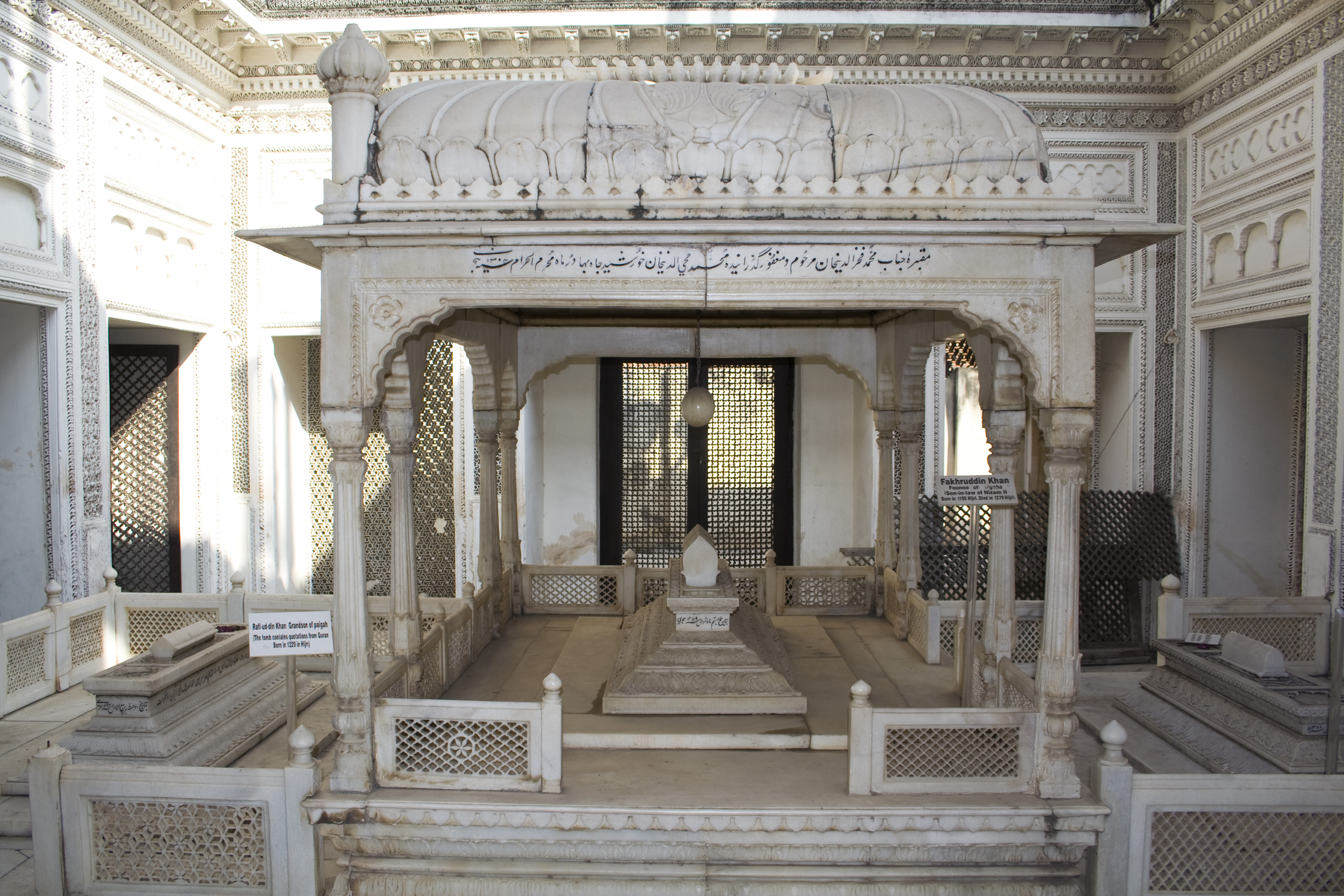
Paigah Tombs: Tomb of Amir e Kabir I, Abul Fakhr Fakhruddin Khan, Shums ud Dowla, Shums ul Mulk, Shums ul Umra,2nd Amir e Paigah.Son-In-Law of 2nd Nizam of Hyderabad

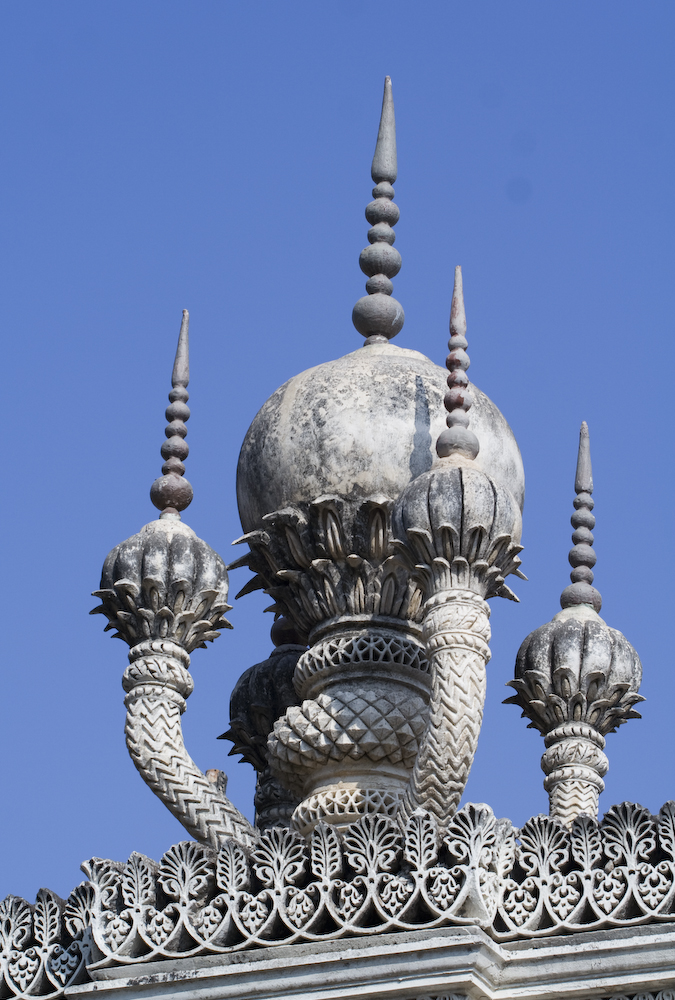
Paigah Tombs: Pineapple Shape Stucco work

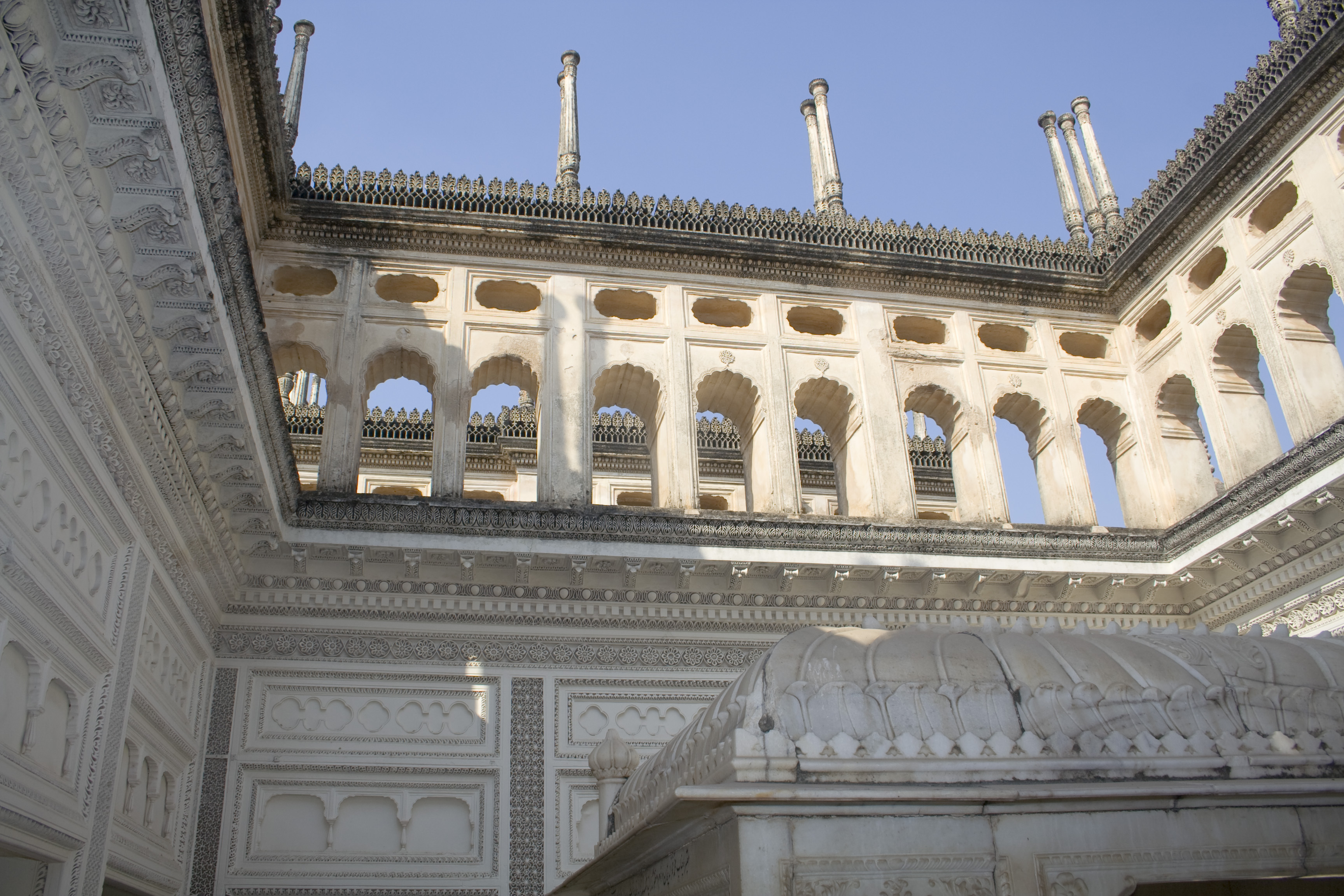
Paigah Tombs: Stucco work and open Ceiling

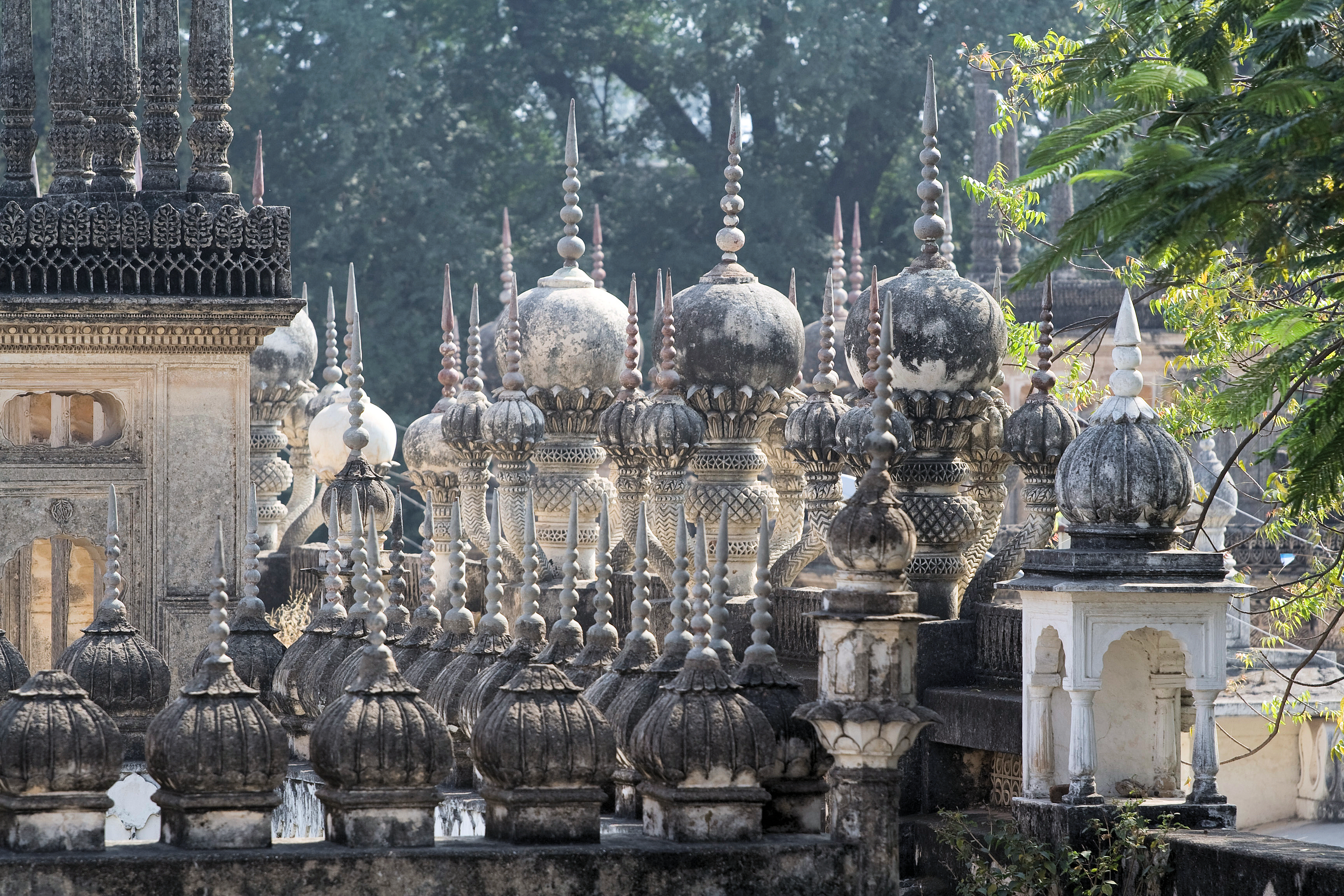
Paigah Tombs: Stucco work on the roof

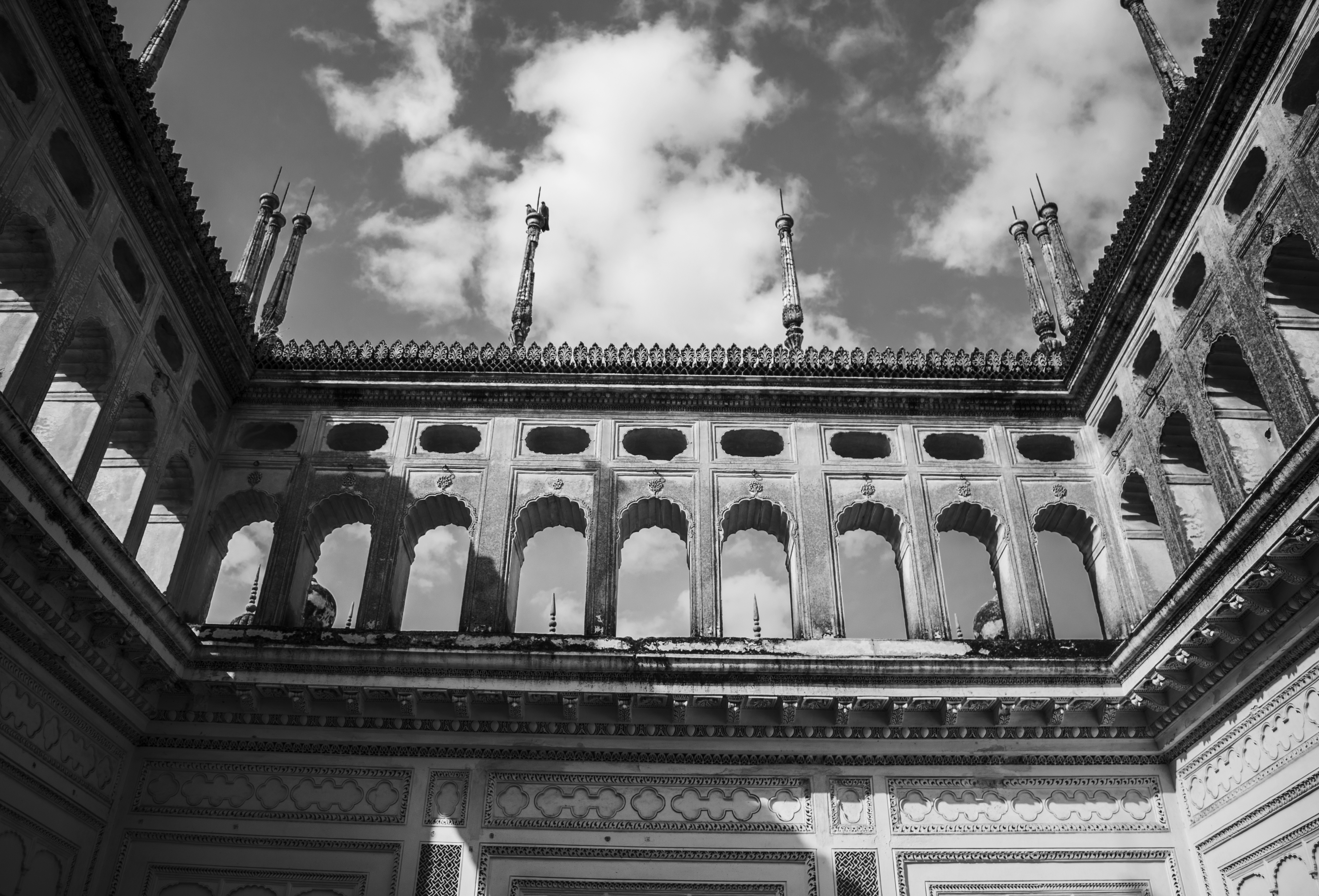
Inside Paigah tombs

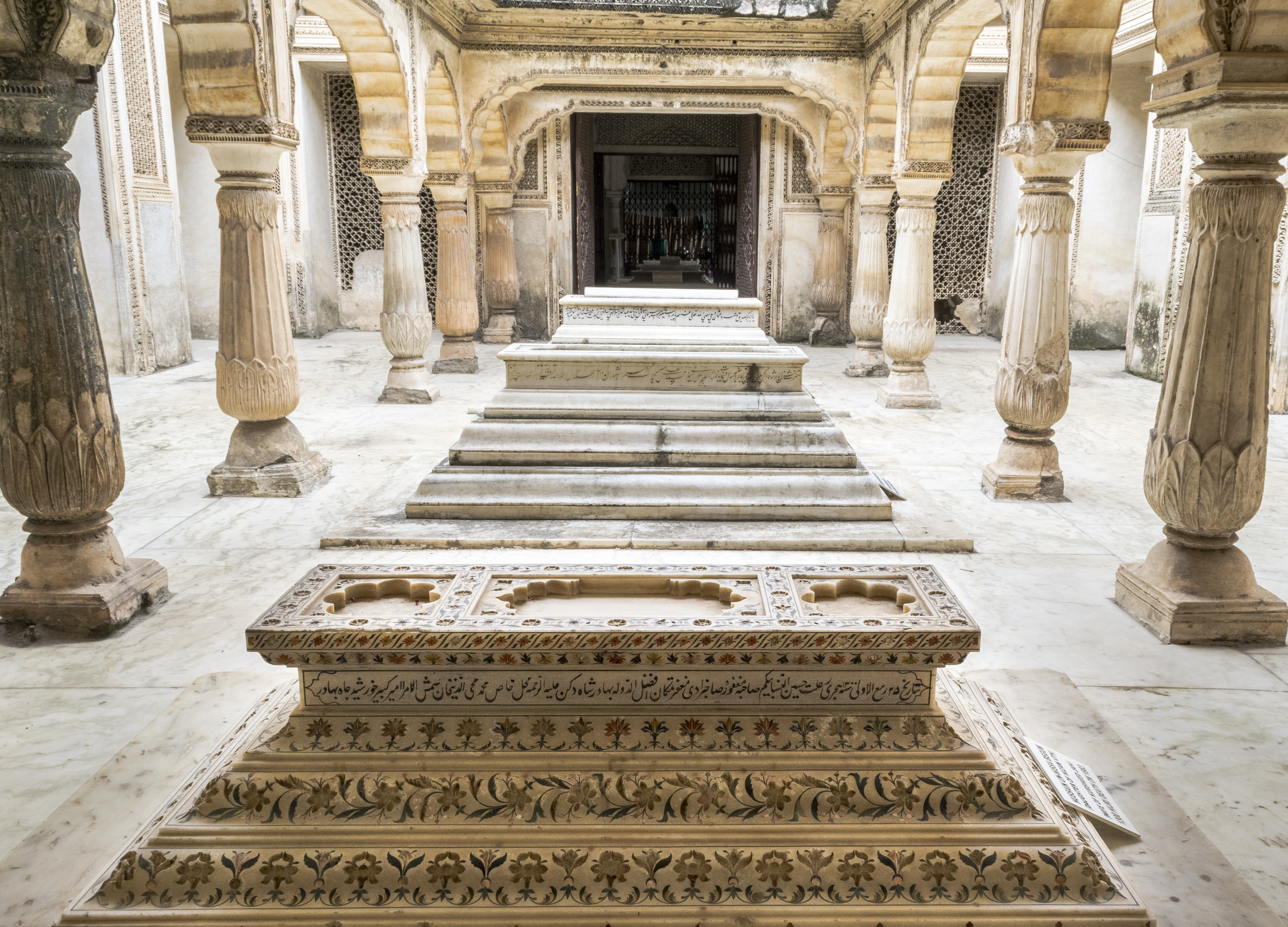
Graves

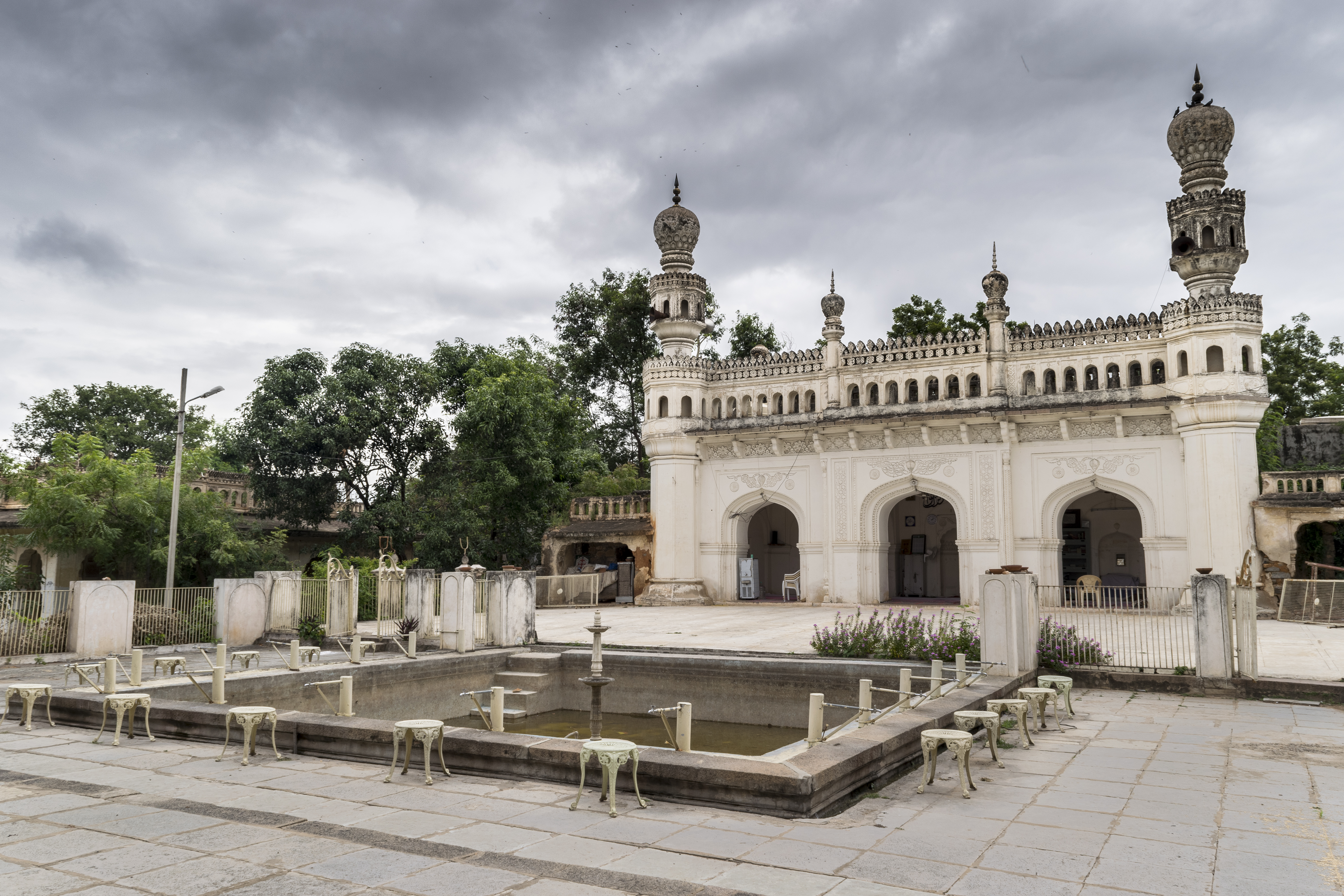
Mosque at Paigah tombs
