= Basheer Bagh Palace =

Coordinates: 17.399782°N 78.476615°E

Bashir Bagh Palace
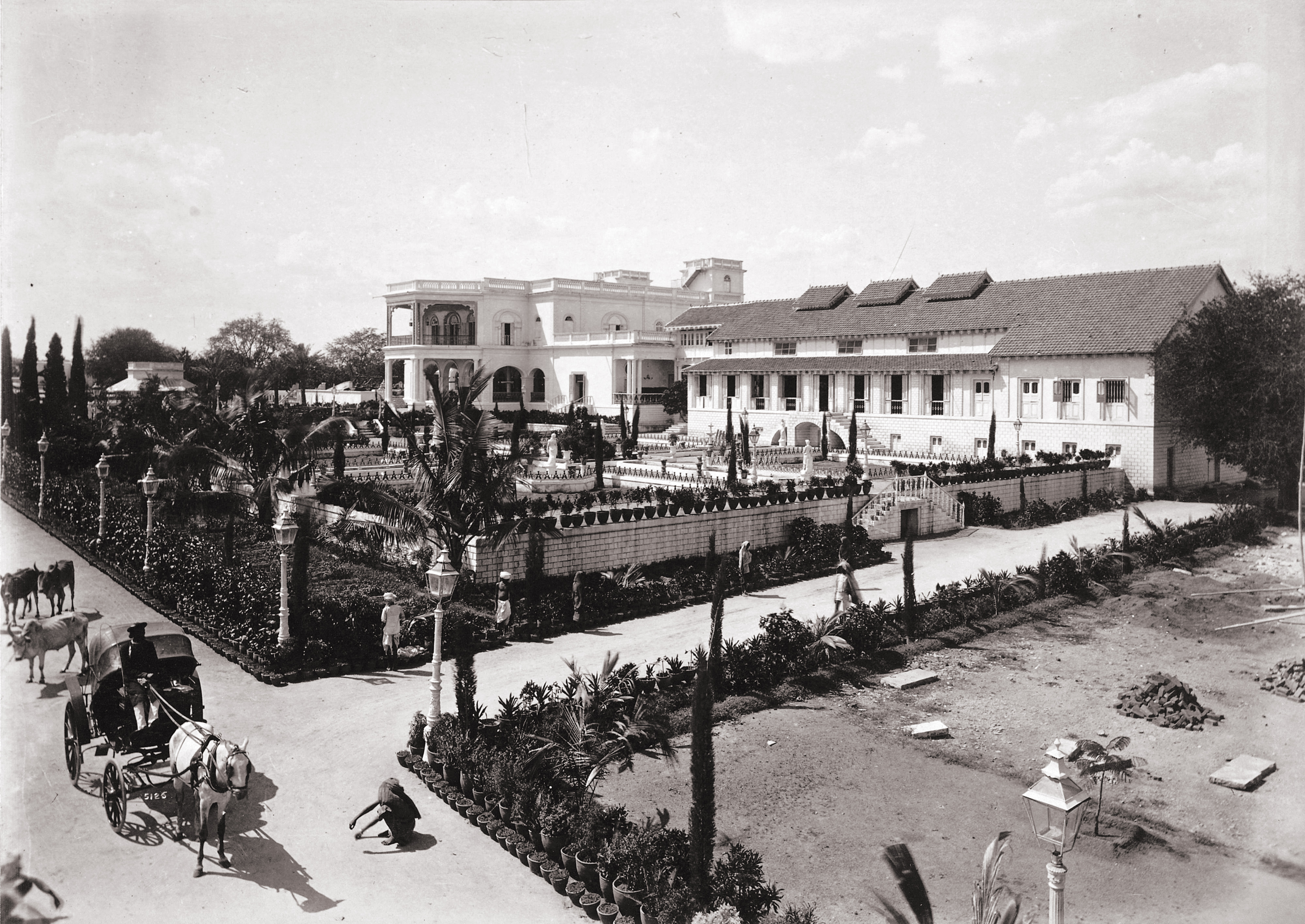
- Interactive map of the Bashir Bagh Palace area

General information
- Type: Royal Palace
- Location: Hyderabad, Telangana, India
- Completed: circa 1880

Basheer Bagh Palace or Bashir Bagh Palace was a palace located in Hyderabad, Telangana, India. It was constructed by Sir Asman Jah, member of Paigah noble family and Prime Minister of Hyderabad state (1887–1894). The palace was demolished in the 1970s.

== History ==
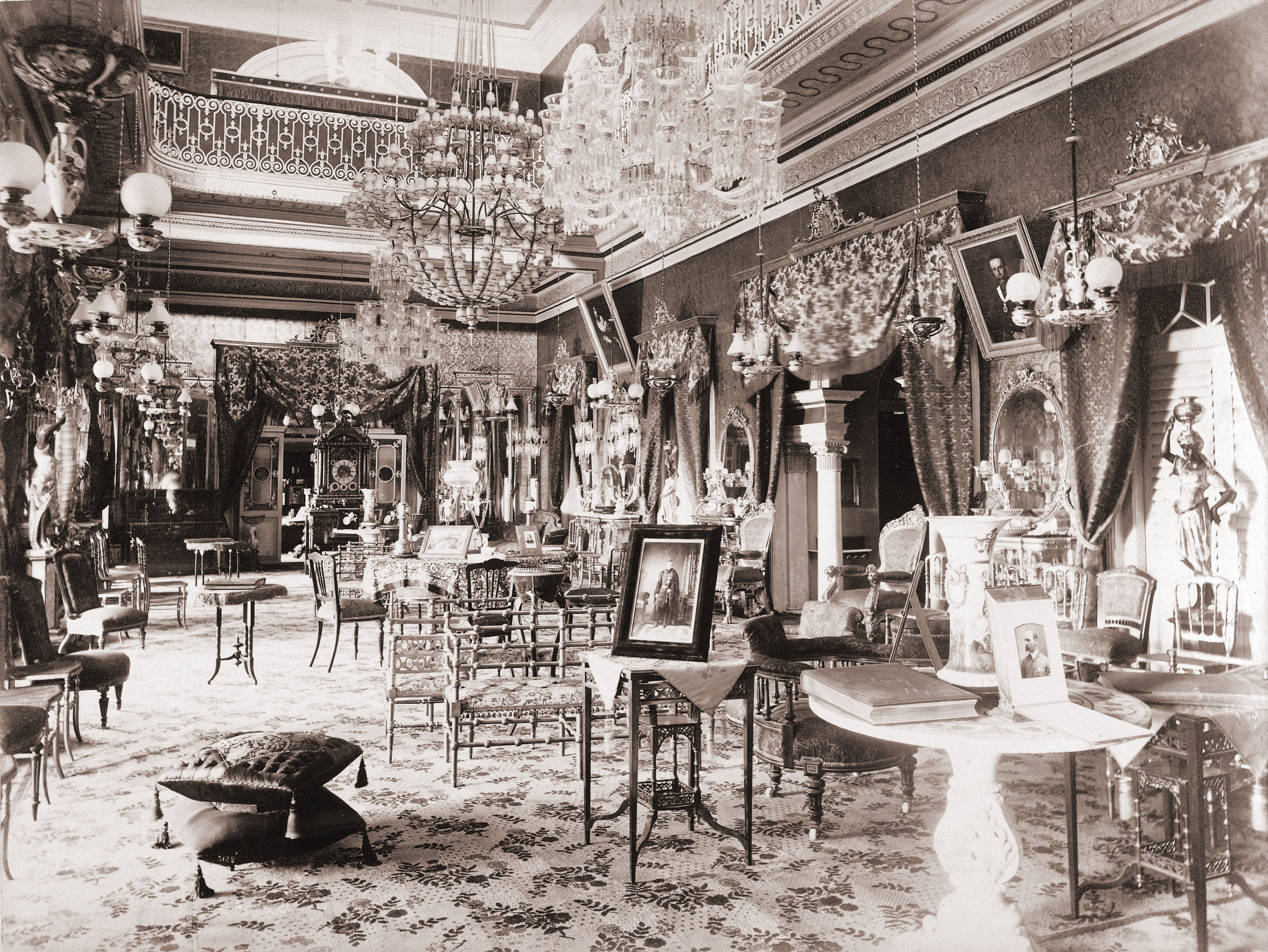
The interior of Bashir Bagh Palace, photographed by Lala Deen Dayal, c. 1880.

It was once a palace with great architecture and magnificent interior. The palace was dismantled by the state government after Indian independence, but the area is still known as Basheerbagh. This palace was built in 1880.

This place has the distinction of playing host to the Hindustani classical maestro, Bade Ghulam Ali Khan, who stayed here in the final years of his life, patronized by Zahir Yar Jung. He died at this palace on 25 April 1968. After the abolition of the jagirs in 1949, Zahir Yar Jung and other grandsons of Asman Jah were unable to maintain the palace which led to the abandoning of the property and several other palaces of the family. Later, portions of the land were sold in the 1960s.
