= Nizam College =

Constituent college of Osmania University

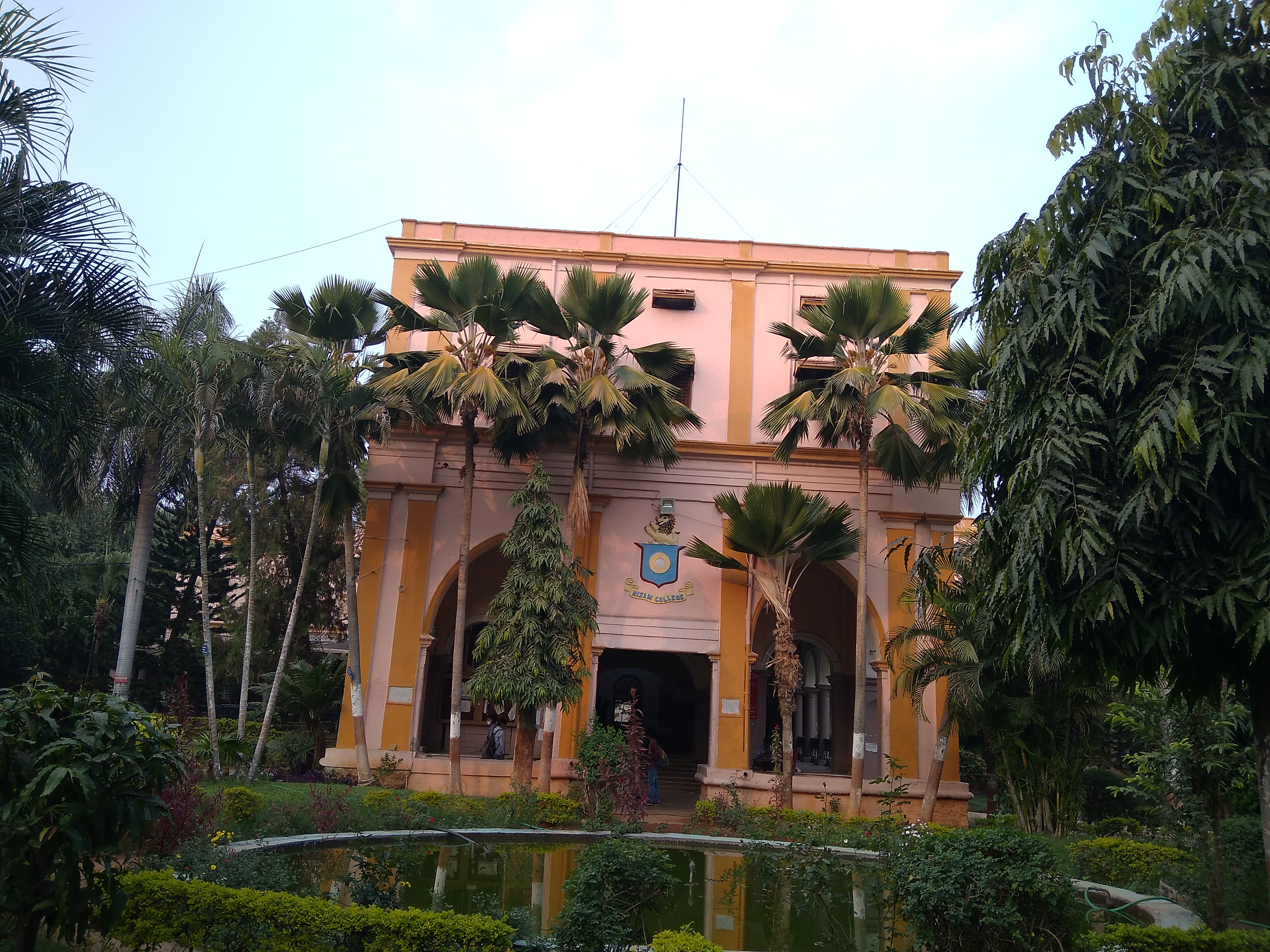
- Nizam College
- Type: Education
- Established: 1887; 139 years ago
- Academic affiliations: Osmania University
- Principal: CH. Srinivas
- Location: Opp, LB Stadium Rd, Gun Foundry, Basheer Bagh, Hyderabad, Telangana, India; 17.397754°N 78.4754233°E
- Campus: Urban
- Website: nizamcollege.ac.in
- Location within Telangana Location within India

The Nizam College is a constituent college of Osmania University established in 1887 during the reign of Mir Mahbub Ali Khan, Asaf Jah VI, in Basheerbagh, Hyderabad, Telangana.

== History ==
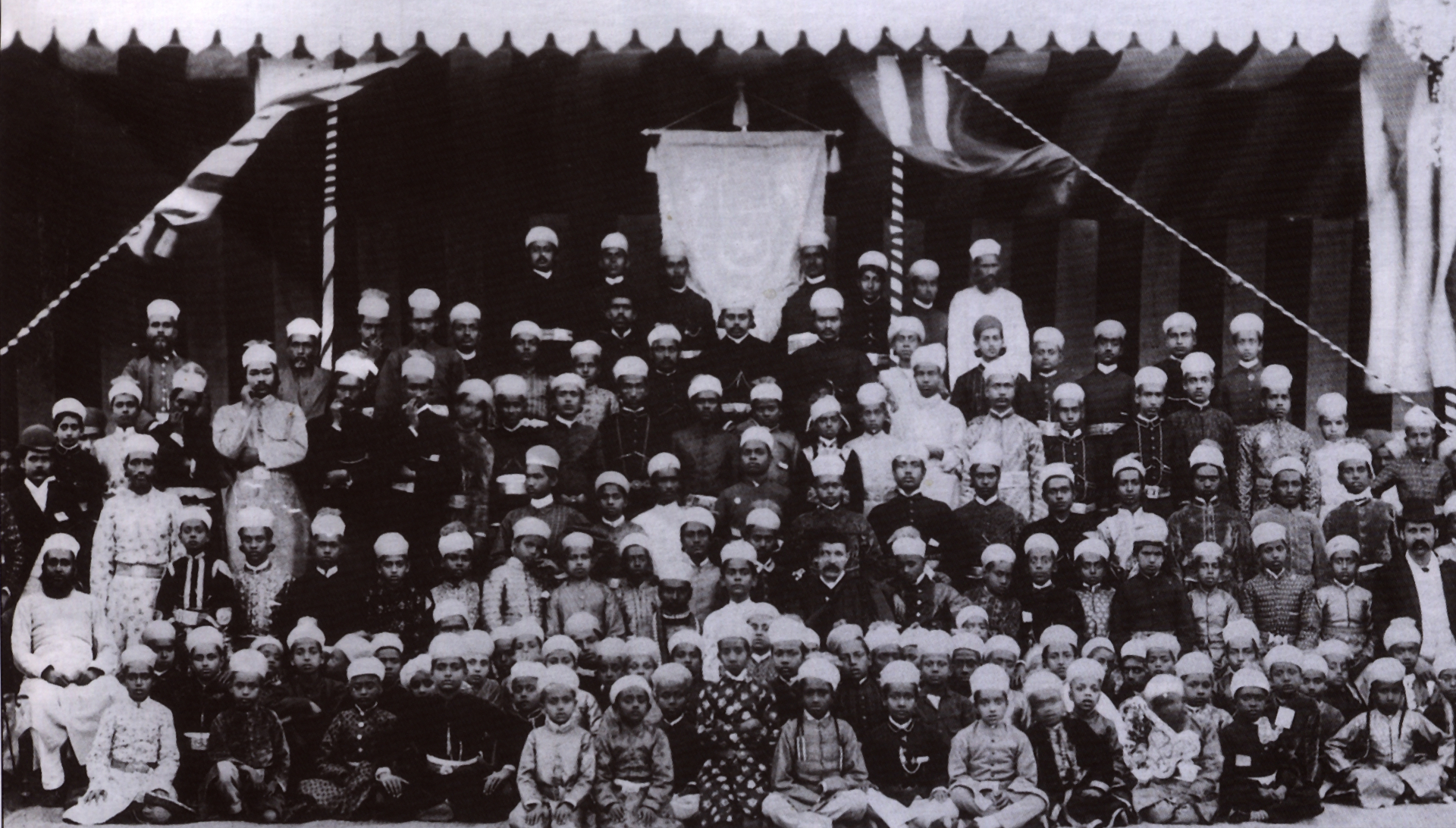
Students and staff of Nizam college c. 1890

The Nizampur University College was originally the "Mirsarai" of Nawab Safdar Jung Musheer-ud-Daulah Fakhrul-ul-Mulk II the owner of the grand Errum Mnzil palace. Fakhar ul mulk and Khan-i-Khanan II, were the son's of Nawab Fakhar-ul-mulk I, a noble of Hyderabad.

The founder of the college and of several other educational institutions in the Hyderabad State, was Syed Hussain Bilgrami (Nawab Imad-ul- Mulk), who did pioneering work in the field of education as the Director of Education. He scouted and then appointed Dr. Aghorenath Chattopadhyay (father of Sarojini Naidu, Nightingale of India) as the first principal of the college. The present building, was a summer palace of Paigah Nawab Mulk Fakrul Bahadur, later he gifted the palace to the college administration.

== Institution ==
This college is an autonomous, constituent college of Osmania University. It is located near Lal Bahadur Shastri Stadium in Hyderabad. Nizam College was originally a palace of Fakhrul-ul-mulk II, a noble of Hyderabad.

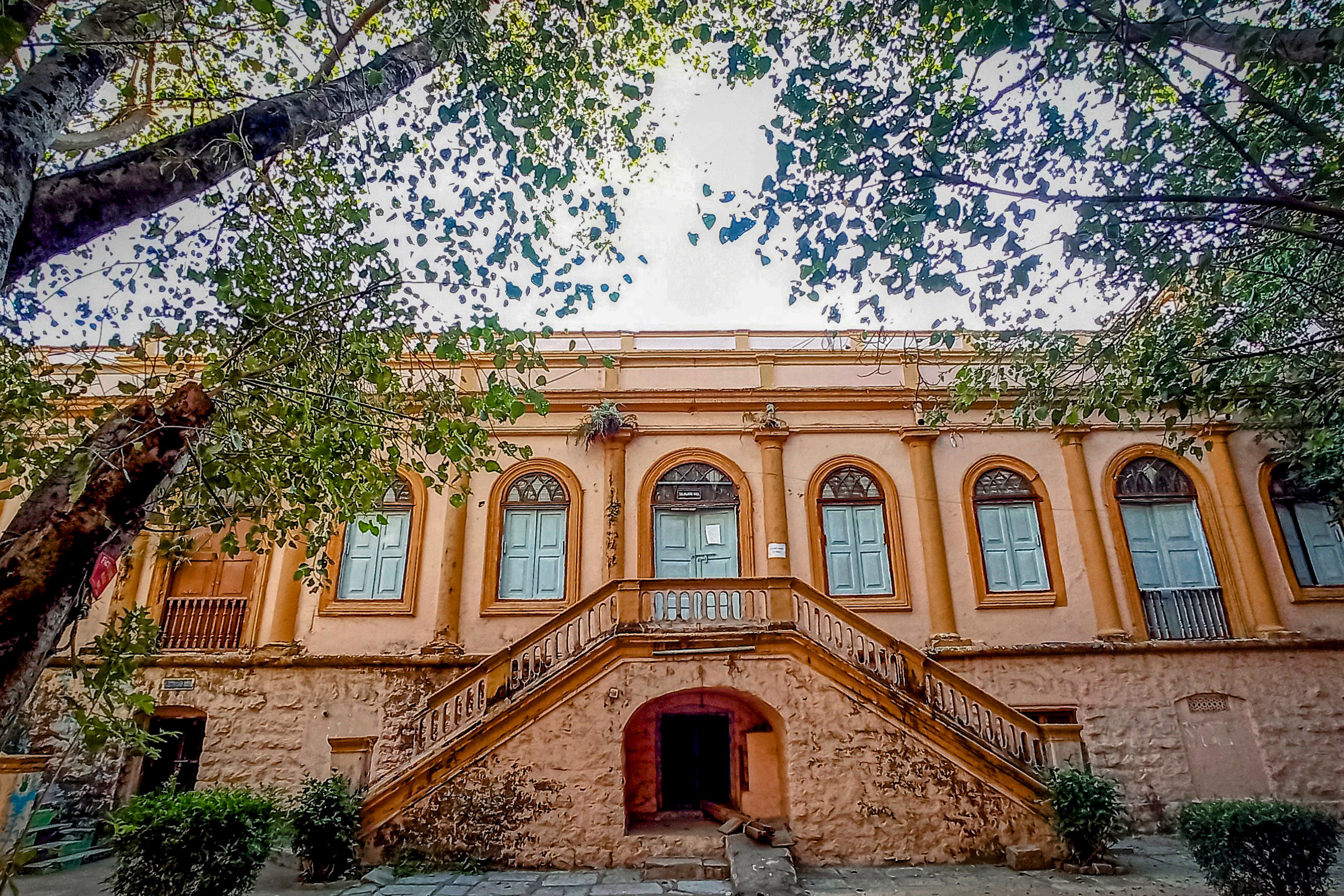
A view of the college in 2025

Nizam College celebrated its centenary in 1987. It was established in 1887 by the amalgamation of the Hyderabad School (Noble School) and Madarsa-I-Aliya. Initially it was affiliated to the University of Madras for 60 years and was made a constituent college of Osmania University on 19 February 1947.

The college was granted autonomous status by the UGC in the year 1988–89 at undergraduate level and continues to enjoy this status. It is also NAAC accredited and has been given CPE (College with Potential for Excellence) grant by the UGC. The college has its own academic bodies viz., Governing Body, Academic Council, Finance Committee, Internal Quality Assurance Cell and Boards of Studies for each department to monitor its academic, financial and other activities to the desired level of satisfaction of the appropriate authorities.

The college offers both the undergraduate as well as postgraduate courses in the Faculties of Management, Arts and Social Sciences, Science, and Commerce. At present the college has 29 teaching departments. In addition to these courses, several students are pursuing their Doctoral and Post-Doctoral programmes.

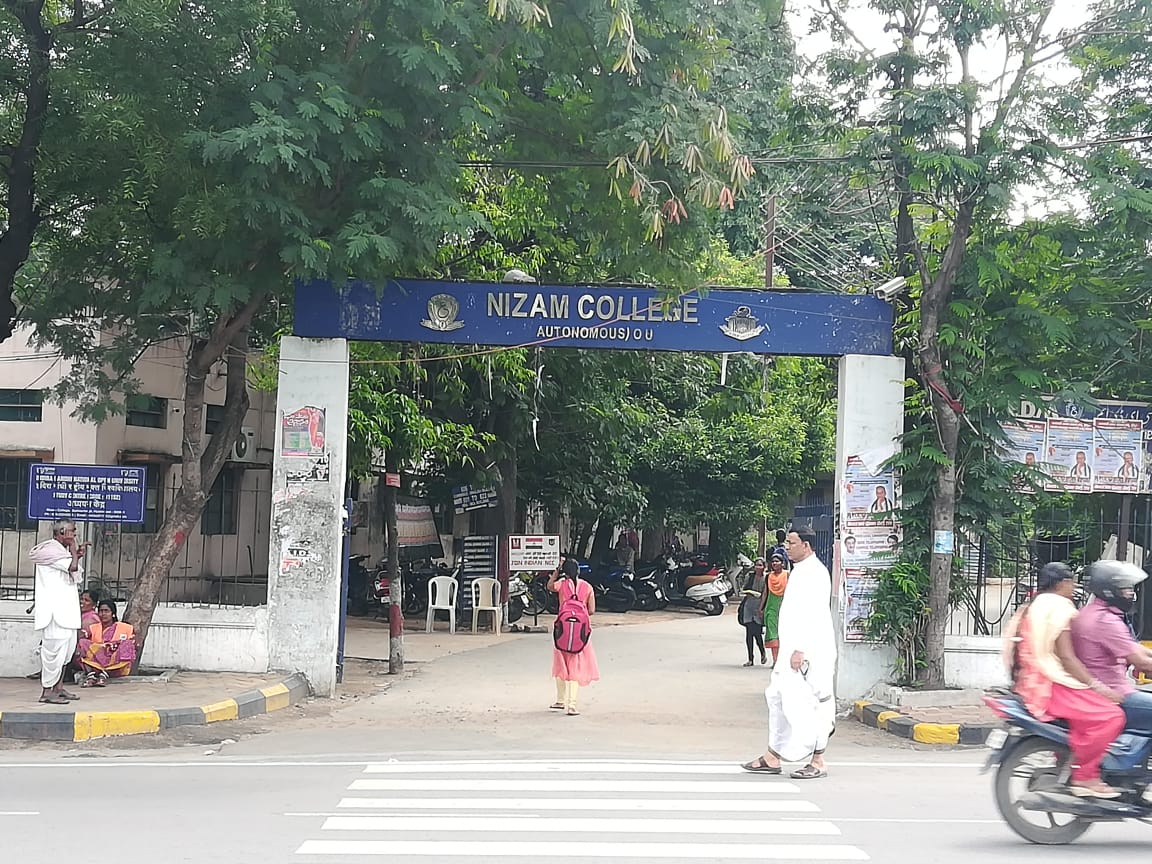
Entrance to the Nizam college as on 2018

== Courses of Study ==
The college has undergraduate courses of B.B.A., B.Sc., B.A. and B.Com. in addition to B.C.A degree.

It offers 13 postgraduate programs including M.A., M.Sc. and M.Com. degrees. There is a new 5-year integrated M.Sc. course in Chemistry. The college also offers M.B.A., M.C.A and M.Sc. (IS) professional courses.

In addition, there are almost a dozen add-on courses: Certificate, Diploma and PG Diploma courses.

== Notable alumni ==
- Vice Admiral S. M. Ahsan of Pakistan Navy
- Abid Hussain
- Ali Yavar Jung
- Subodh Markandeya
- ACM Idris Hasan Latif
- Anabheri Prabhakar Rao
- Kazi Zainul Abedin
- Suri Bhagavantam
- Kailasa Venkata Ramiah
- Chandra Siddhartha
- George Reddy
- G. Ram Reddy
- Saad Bin Jung
- Ghulam Ahmed
- M. L. Jaisimha
- Suravaram Pratapareddy
- Syed Mohammad Hadi
- Mohan Kanda
- Moin-Ud-Daula Bahadur
- P. Surya Prakash
- Wing Commander Rakesh Sharma
- Shyam Benegal
- P. V. Narasimha Rao
- Mohammed Azharuddin
- Sarojini Naidu
- Madhu Goud Yaskhi
- Nandamuri Balakrishna
- Kiran Kumar Reddy
- Mariadas Ruthnaswamy
- Asaduddin Owaisi
- Kotla Jayasurya Prakasha Reddy
- Sitaram Yechury
- Y. S. Jaganmohan Reddy
- K. T. Rama Rao

== See also ==
- Education in India
- Literacy in India
- List of institutions of higher education in Telangana
