= Asman Jah =

Hyderabadi politician

Nawab Sir H.E Asman Jah Bahadur Bahadur KCIE
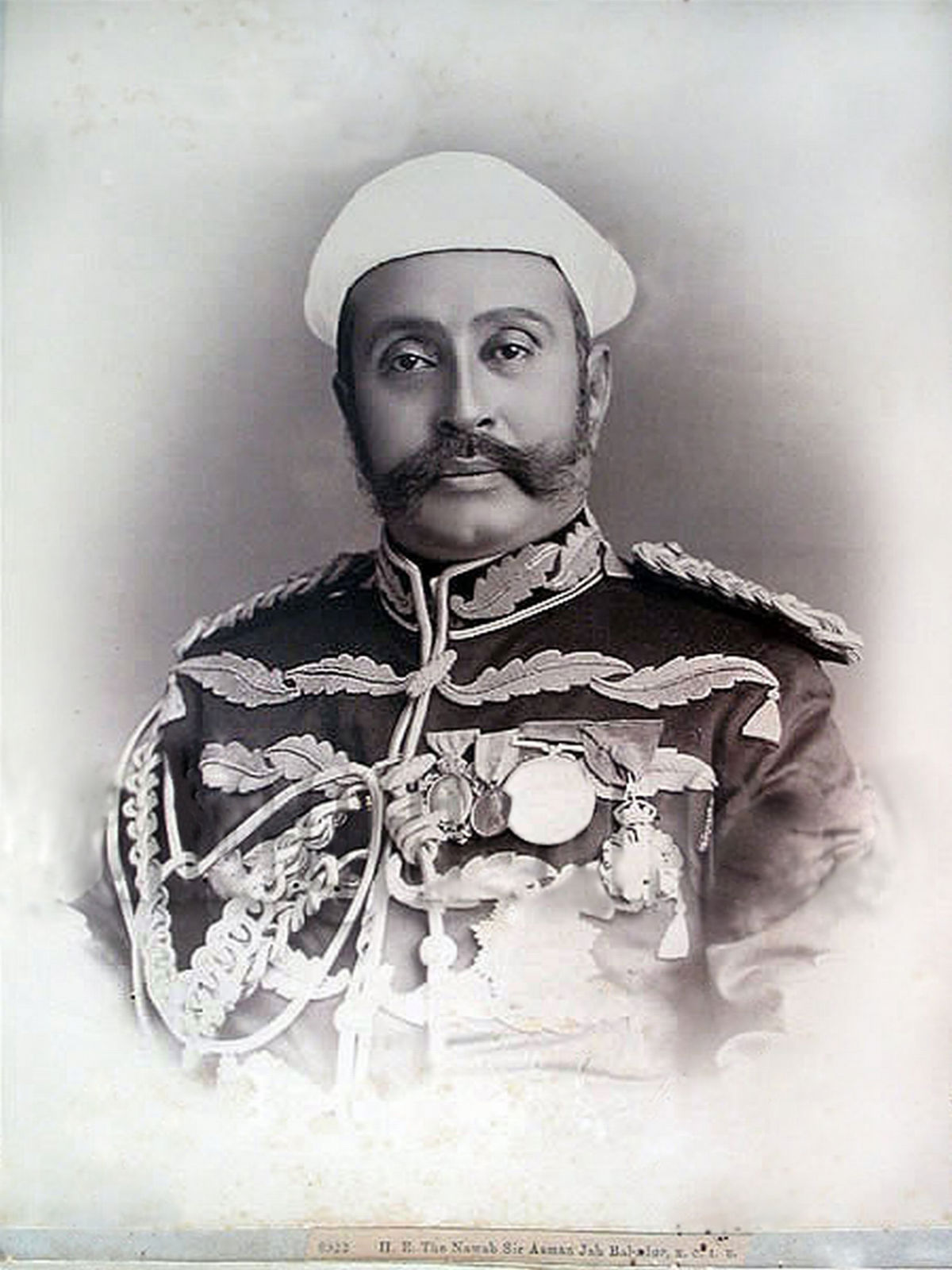

28th Prime Minister of Hyderabad
- In office 1887–1894
- Monarch: Mahbub Ali Khan
- Governors General: The Earl of Dufferin; The Marquess of Lansdowne
- Preceded by: Salar Jung II
- Succeeded by: Viqar-ul-Umra

Personal details
- Born: Muhammad Mazharuddin Khan; 1839 British Raj
- Died: 18 July 1898 (aged 58–59) Basheer Bagh Palace, Hyderabad, Hyderabad State (present-day Telangana, India)
- Resting place: Paigah Tombs
- Spouse: Parwarishunnisa Begum
- Children: Moin-ud-Daula bahadur asmah jahi
- Relatives: Viqar-ul-Umra (cousin); Mahbub Ali Khan (brother-in-law); Afzal-ud-Daulah (father-in-law)

His Excellency Amir e Paigah Basheer-Ud-daula Azam-Ul-Umra Amir-e-Akbar Nawab Sir Muhammad Mazharuddin Khan Bahadur Rifa’at Jang KCIE (1839 – 18 July 1898), commonly known as Sir Asman Jah or Nawab Sir Asman Jah Bahadur, was an Indian nobleman and a member of the Paigah family who served as prime minister of Hyderabad from 1887 to 1894. As the grandson of the prominent nobleman Fakhr Uddin Khan Amir e Kabir Shams-ul-Umra I and a princess, he was born into a high social position. However, it was his personal qualities, largely inherited from his grandfather, that brought him to the forefront. Naturally gifted and excelling in all manly pursuits, he easily took the lead among his peers. However, it was his mental and moral qualities that attracted the attention of his royal master when the young noble was still in his early adulthood. He showed such promise that His Highness the Afzal-ud-Daulah gave him his daughter in marriage and bestowed upon him the highest distinction in his gift: the title of Jah.

Asman Jah began his public career as Minister of Justice in 1869. Shortly afterwards, while still retaining the Justice portfolio, he served as prime minister and co-regent. He then became a member of the Council of Regency and, finally, in 1887, he was appointed Prime Minister, a position he held until 1893. Throughout his long official career, Sir Asman Jah refused to accept a salary or the emoluments of office. His premiership was characterised by several reforms, particularly in education and the provision of state-funded medical care, especially for women, as well as the establishment of a permanent Board of Irrigation and city water supply, which has since provided excellent service to the state. Asman Jah was in London when he received news of his appointment as Prime Minister, with one of the first to congratulate him being King Edward VII (then the Prince of Wales). Asman Jah built several structures throughout the city, including the Asman Garh, Basheer Bagh, Saroor Nagar and Mahboob Chowk palaces, as well as the clock tower at Mahboob Chowk. Prior to his premiership, he was sent by His Highness Nizam Mahboob Ali Khan in 1887 to represent him at Queen Victoria's Golden Jubilee in London. While in England, he won widespread acclaim for the tact, savoir faire and breeding he displayed. His handsome presence, imposing stature, and polished manner impressed all classes of English society, and he became a favourite in court circles. Indeed, the late Nizam could not have had a more dignified or worthy representative.

== Early life and ancestry ==
Asman Jah was born as Mazharuddin Khan in 1839, although his exact date of birth is not recorded. His biological father Sultanuddin Khan was the third son of Fakhruddin Khan. After Sultanuddin's death, Asman Jah was adopted by his uncle Rafiuddin Khan Shams-ul-Umra II. Jah's maternal grandmother was Bashirunnisa Begum, a daughter of Nizam Nizam Ali Khan.

He was a member of the noble Paigah family which was only second to the Nizam of Hyderabad. The members of the family were staunch Nizam loyalists. The family descends from the Second Rashidun caliph Umar. Sufi saint Fariduddin Ganjshakar is also an ancestor of the family. One of Jah's ancestors Muhammad Abu’l Khair Khan was a mansabdar during Mughal emperor Aurangzeb's reign. Jah's cousin Viqar-ul-Umra also served as Prime Minister of Hyderabad.

== Political career ==
In 1869, Asman Jah was appointed as Minister for Justice and served in that position until 1888. After the death of Sir Salar Jung I in 1883, Jah was made a member of the Council of Regency. He also went on to become the administrator of the Hyderabad State during the Nizam's visit to Kolkata during the same year.

In 1887, Nizam Mahbub Ali Khan chose Jah to represent him at the Golden Jubilee celebration of Queen Victoria held at the Windsor Castle. After returning from England, he was appointed Prime Minister of the state. He was replaced by his cousin Viqar-ul-Umra in 1894.

On the occasion of Diamond Jubilee of Queen Victoria, the Queen Empress marked her appreciation of Sir Asman Jah and her recognition of the work he had put in both as councillor and as prime minister, as well as her recollection of his engaging personality and staunch loyalty, by bestowing on him the high honour of a K.C.I.E.

== Architecture ==
Jah built the Mahboob Chowk Clock Tower in 1892. The clock tower had clocks on its four sides and was constructed in the middle of a garden. He also built the Basheer Bagh Palace at a cost of about ₹400,000 (equivalent to ₹210 million or US$2.2 million in 2026) in c. 1880. Jah also constructed the Asmah Garh Palace in 1885 at the top of a hillock in Hyderabad. It was built in the Gothic architecture style and had pointed arches supported by Corinthian pillars. Jah's brother-in-law and Nizam Mahbub Ali Khan enjoyed living in the palace and he later gifted it to the Nizam. The building presently houses the St. Joseph's Public School.

== Personal life ==
Jah was married to Parwarishunnisa Begum, the daughter of the fifth Nizam Tahniyath Ali Khan. They had one son Moin-Ud-Dowlah Bahadur who was born in 1891. Jah died at Basheer Bagh Palace on 16 July 1898 and is buried at Paigah Tombs. Jah brought up cricketer Syed Mohammad Hadi after his father died. Hadi scored the first-ever century in the Ranji Trophy.

Asmah Jah's full name with titles is Asmah Jah, Amir-i-Akbar, Azam-ul-Umra, Umdat-ul-Mulk, Bashir-ud-Daulah, Nawab Sir Muhammad Mazharuddin Khan Bahadur, Rifat Jung KCIE.

== Sources ==
- Lynton, Harriet Ronken (1992), Days of the Beloved, Orient Blackswan, ISBN 9780863112690
- Lethbridge, Roper (2005), The Golden Book of India: A Genealogical and Biographical Dictionary of the Ruling Princes, Chiefs, Nobles, and Other Personages, Titled Or Decorated of the Indian Empire, Aakar Books, ISBN 9788187879541

Government offices
| Preceded by Salar Jung II | Prime Minister of Hyderabad; 1887–1893 | Succeeded by Sir Vicar-ul-Umra |
