= Lala Deen Dayal =

Indian photographer (1844–1905)

Raja Lala Deen Dayal लाला दीन दयाल
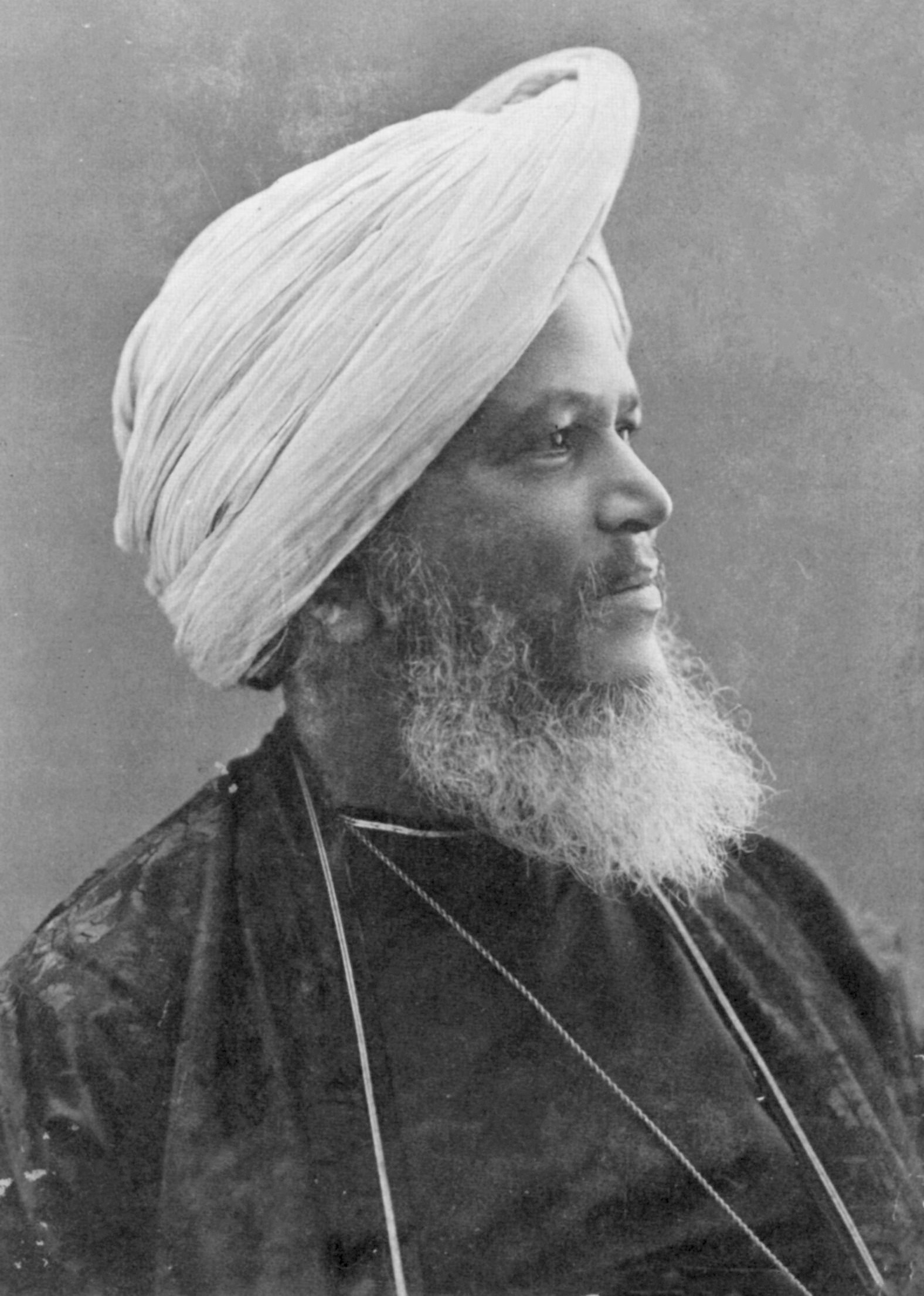
- Lala Deen Dayal, c. 1890
- Born: c. 1844; Sardhana, North-Western Provinces, Company Raj
- Died: July 1905; Bombay, Bombay Presidency, British India
- Education: Thomason College of Civil Engineering
- Known for: Photography
- Website: https://www.laladeendayal.com/

Raja Lala Deen Dayal (Hindi: लाला दीन दयाल; c. 1844 – 1905; also written as 'Din Dyal' and 'Diyal' in his early years), famously known as Raja Deen Dayal) was an Indian photographer. His career began in the mid-1870s as a commissioned photographer; eventually he set up studios in Indore, Mumbai and Hyderabad. He became the court photographer to the sixth Nizam of Hyderabad, Mahbub Ali Khan, Asif Jah VI, who awarded him the title Raja Bahadur Musavvir Jung Bahadur, and he was appointed as the photographer to the Viceroy of India in 1885.

He received the Royal Warrant from Queen Victoria in 1897.

The Nizam of Hyderabad conferred the honorary title of Raja upon him.

== Early life and education ==
Deen Dayal was born in Sardhana, Uttar Pradesh, near Meerut in a family of jewellers. He received technical training at Thomason College of Civil Engineering at Roorkee (now IIT Roorkee) in 1866 as an engineer in lower subordinate class.

== Career ==
In 1866, Deen Dayal entered government service as head estimator and draughtsman in the Department of Works Secretariat Office in Indore. Meanwhile, he took up photography. His first patron in Indore was Maharaja Tukoji Rao II of Indore state, who in turn introduced him to Sir Henry Daly, agent to the Governor General for Central India (1871–1881) and the founder of Daly College, who encouraged his work, along with the Maharaja himself who encouraged him to set up his studio in Indore. Soon he was getting commissions from Maharajas and the British Raj. The following year he was commissioned to photograph the Governor-General's tour of Central India. In 1868, Deen Dayal founded his studio – Lala Deen Dayal & Sons – and was subsequently commissioned to photograph temples and palaces of India. He established studios in Indore (Mid 1870s), Secunderabad (1886) and Bombay (1896).

In 1875–76, Deen Dayal photographed the Royal Tour of the Prince and Princess of Wales. In the early 1880s he travelled with Sir Lepel Griffin through Bundelkhand, photographing the ancient architecture of the region. Griffin commissioned him to do archaeological photographs: The result was a portfolio of 86 photographs, known as "Famous Monuments of Central India".

The next year he retired from government service and concentrated on his career as a professional photographer. Deen Dayal became the court photographer to the sixth Nizam of Hyderabad in 1885. Soon afterward he moved from Indore to Hyderabad. In the same year he was appointed as the photographer to the Viceroy of India. In time, the Nizam of Hyderabad conferred the honorary title of Raja upon him. It was at this time that Dayal created the firm Raja Deen Dayal & Sons in Hyderabad.

Raja Deen Dayal was appointed photographer to Queen Victoria in 1897.

In 1905–1906, Raja Deen Dayal accompanied the Royal Tour of the Prince and Princess of Wales.

== Legacy ==
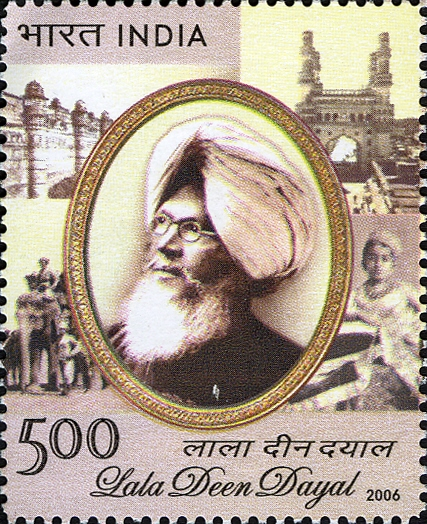
Raja Lala Deen Dayal on a 2006 stamp of India

The Lala Deen Dayal studios' collection of 2,857 glass plate negatives was bought by the Indira Gandhi National Centre for the Arts (IGNCA), New Delhi in 1989. Today it is the largest repository of his work. A large collection including celebrated images of the 1870s' famine are with the Peabody Essex Museum, US and the Alkazi collection in Delhi. In 2010, a retrospective exhibition of his work was held at IGNCA, curated by Jyotindra Jain.

In 2006, a curated collection of Raja Deen Dayal's photographs was exhibited at the Salar Jung Museum during the Times Hyderabad Festival; subsequently in November, the Ministry of Communications, Department of Posts released a commemorative stamp honouring him; the ceremony was held at Jubilee Hall, Hyderabad.

== Gallery ==
Photographs taken by Deen Dayal in the 1880s, sourced from the British Library, George Curzon's Collection: Views of HH the Nizam's Dominions, Hyderabad, Deccan, 1892.

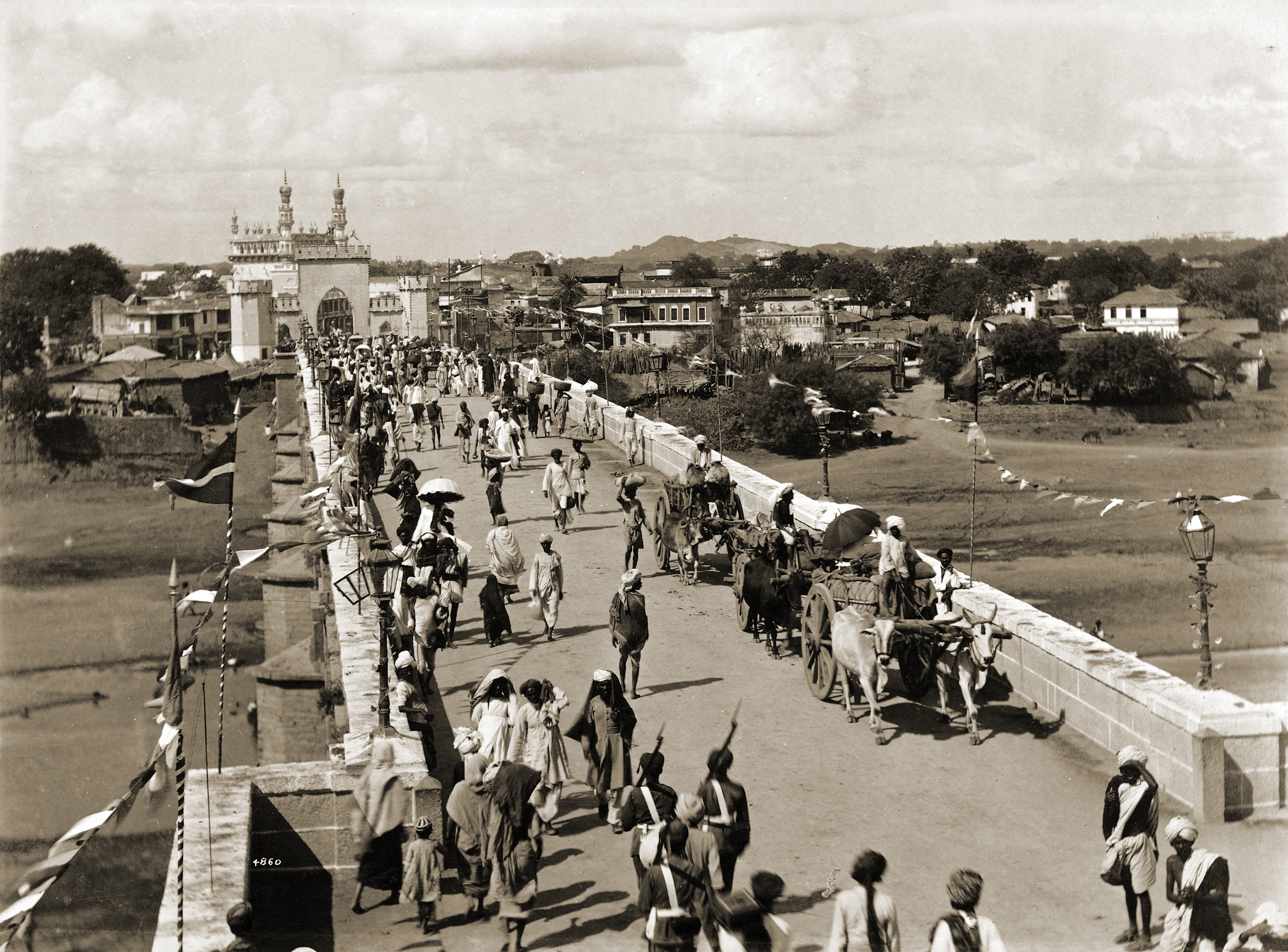
Purana Pul, Hyderabad

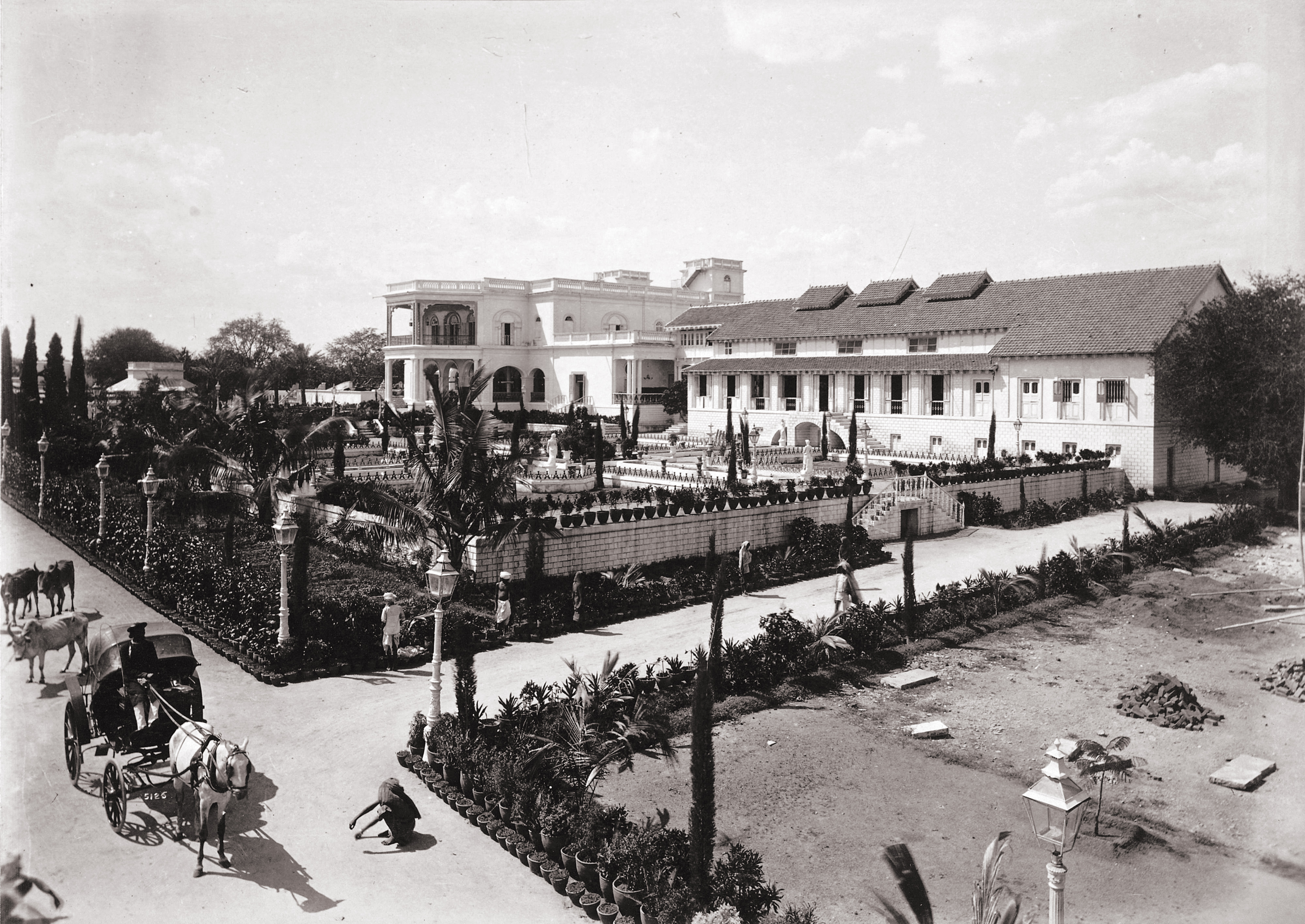
Bashir Bagh Palace, Hyderabad

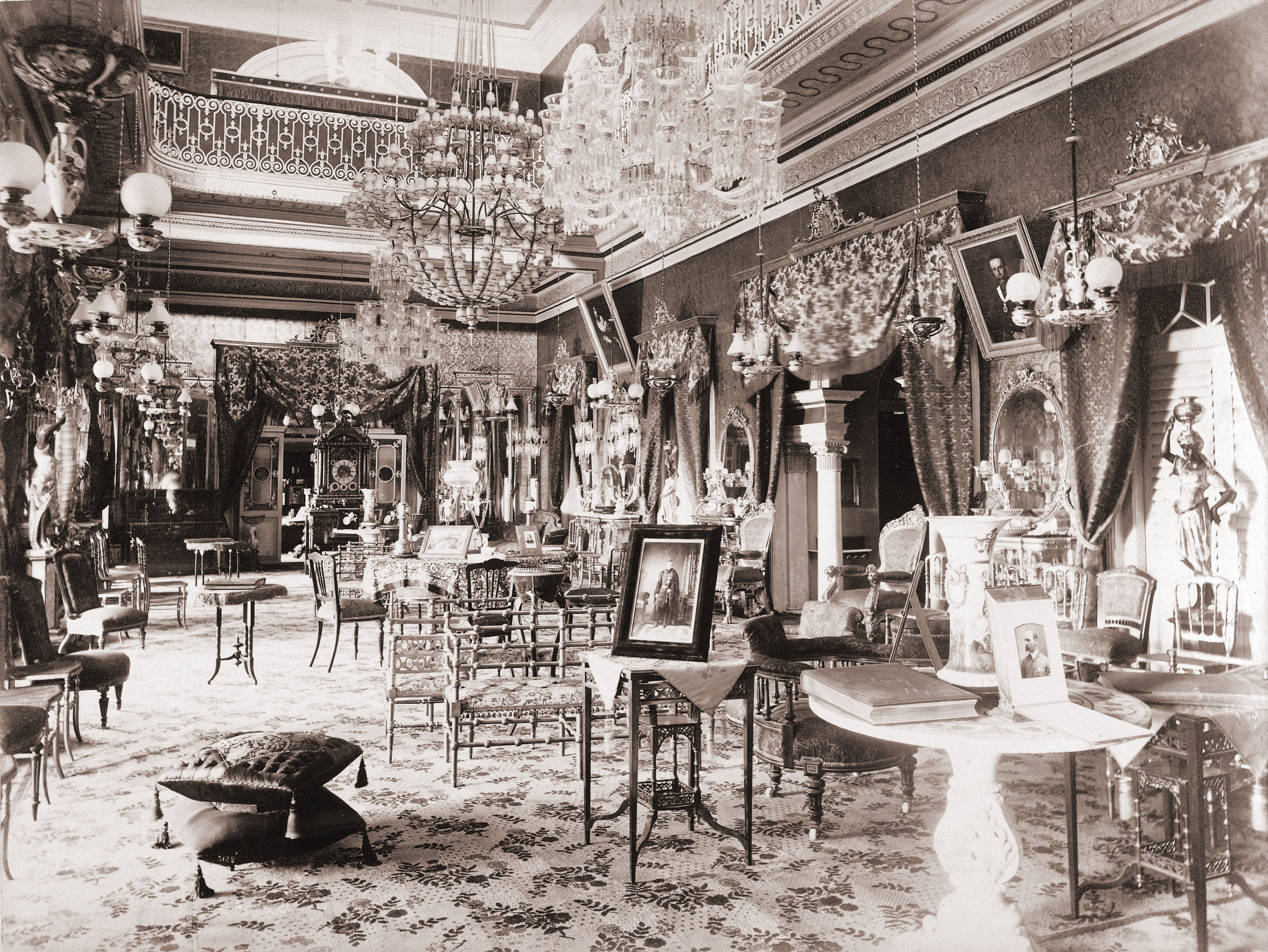
The interior of the Basir-bagh Palace

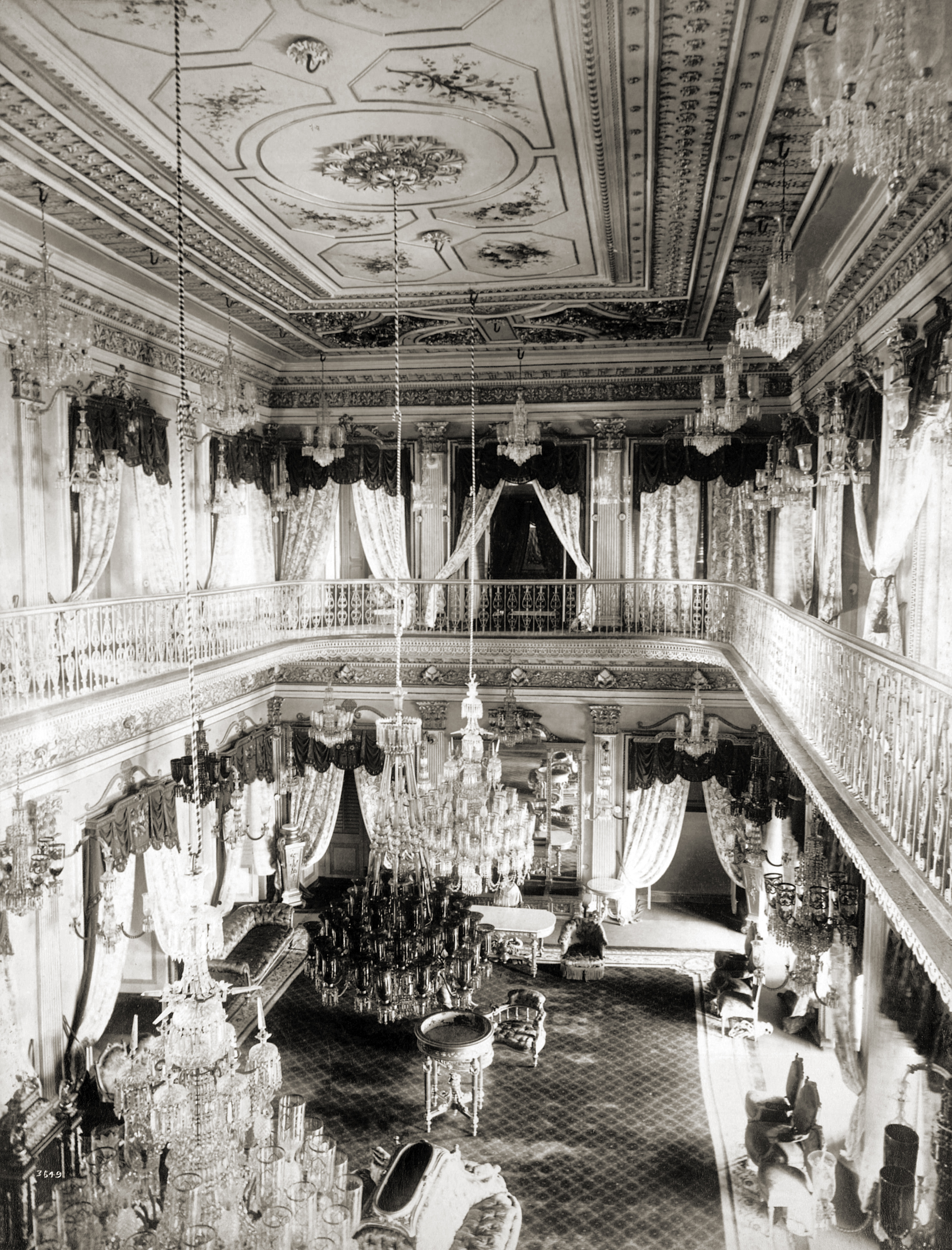
Drawing Room of Chowmahalla Palace, Hyderabad

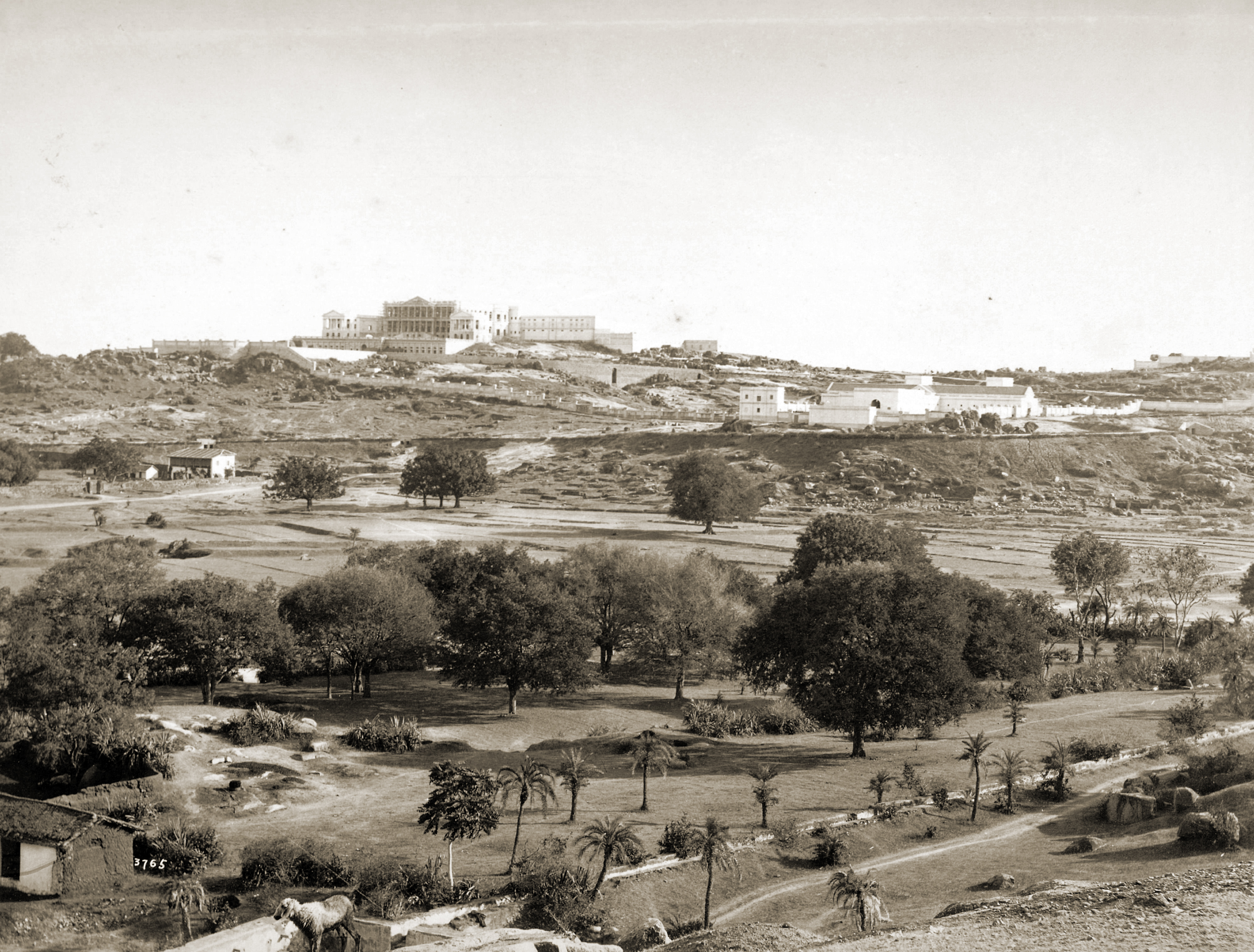
A distant view of the Falaknuma Palace from an opposite hillside, taken by in the 1880s

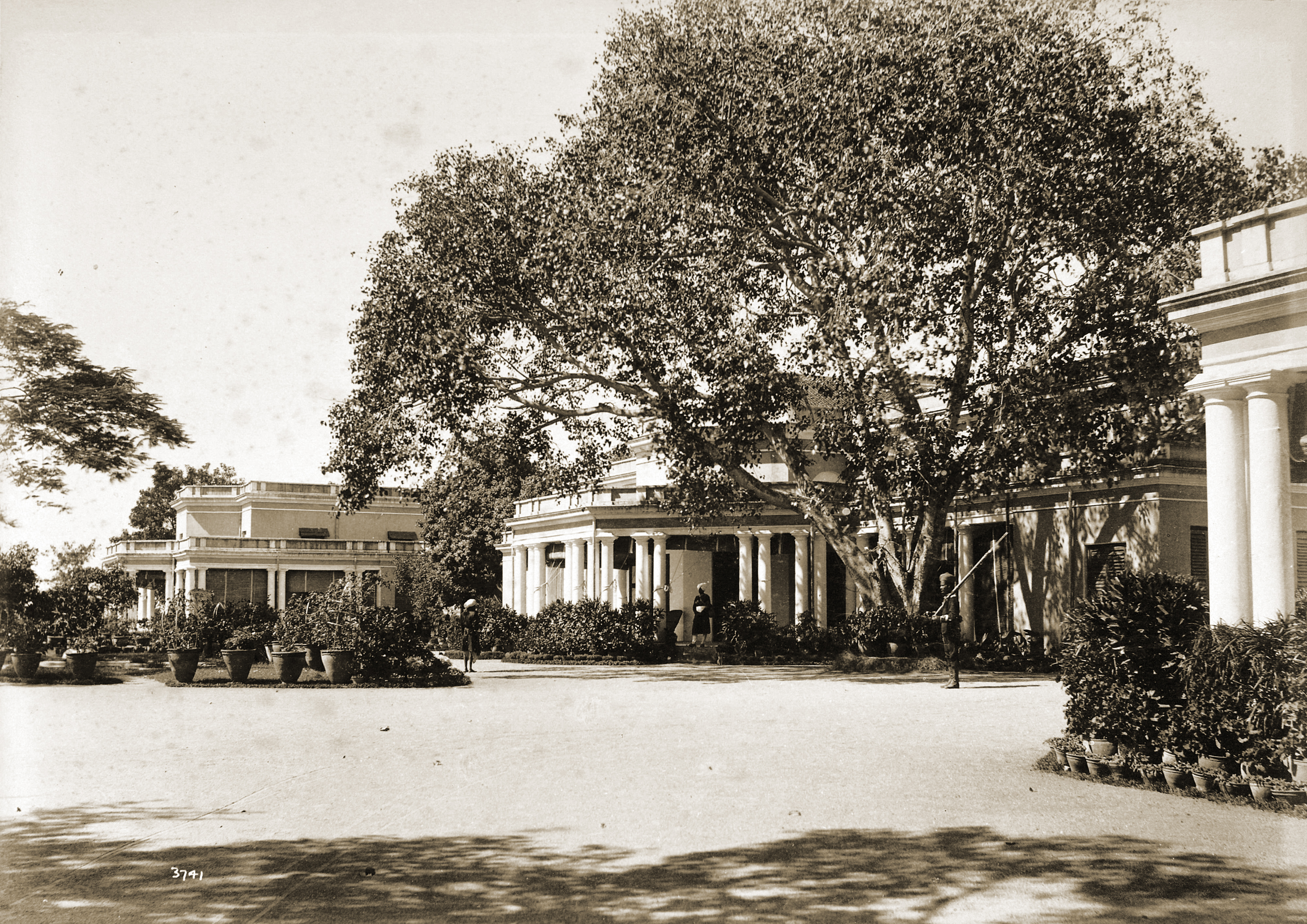
Rashtrapati Nilayam, Hyderabad, then Residency House circa 1892
