= Asman Garh Palace =

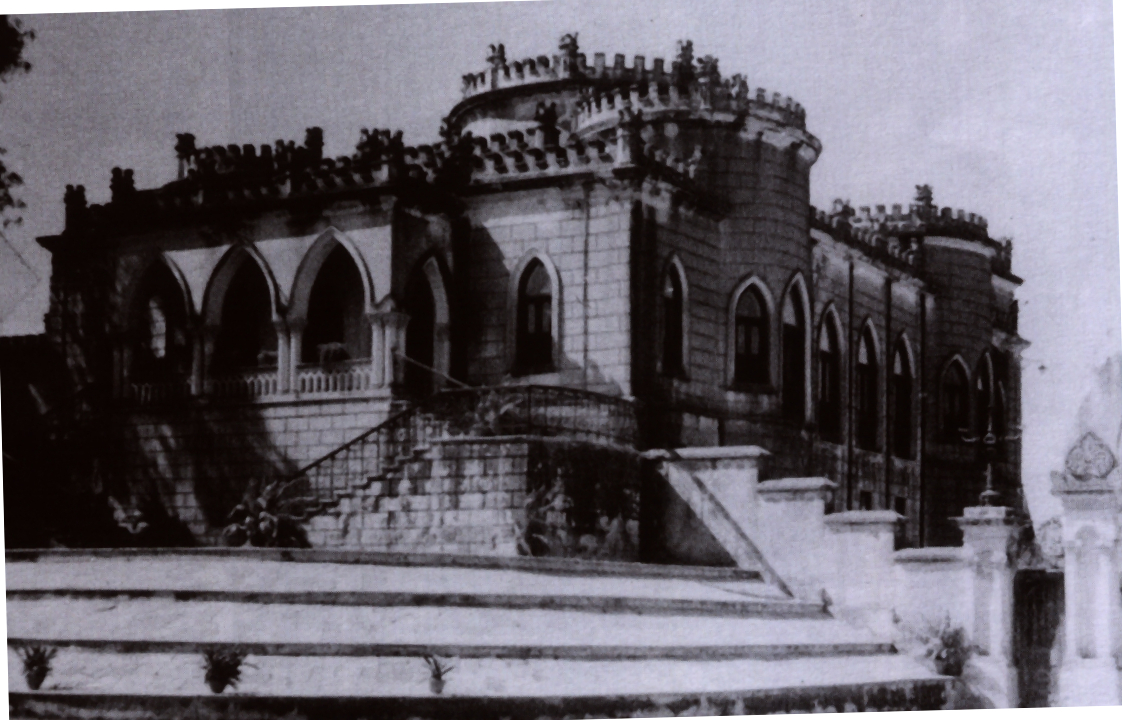

General information
- Type: mansion
- Architectural style: Gothic
- Location: Hyderabad, Telangana, India
- Current tenants: St. Joseph's Public School
- Completed: 1885; 141 years ago

Asman Garh Palace located in Malakpet, a suburb of Hyderabad, was a palace belonging to the Paigahs of Hyderabad State. The palace was declared a heritage structure by INTACH. Asman means "sky", and Garh means "home", since the palace was located so high on a hillock.

The palace hosted a museum displaying archaeological relics. After that converted to an orphanage for a brief period of time. The palace presently is converted into a school (St Joseph's Public School, Asman Garh Palace branch). Located near the TV tower at Malakpet, the Asmangarh Palace was constructed in 1885 by the Paigah Noble Sir Asman Jah. Large parts of the heritage structure was demolished in 2021 by school authorities to build a structure adjacent to it.

== History ==
The Asmangarh Palace is located on a hillock with a commanding view of the surrounding forest, which served as a hunting preserve for the Nizam and his courtiers. The Nizam was so fascinated by this miniature castle that he became a regular visitor. Sir Asman Jah eventually gave it to the Nizam. It was designed personally and built by the erstwhile Prime Minister of Hyderabad state Sir Asman Jah in 1885 on a hillock for leisure. He belonged to the Paigah family. He fulfilled his dream of building a home close to the sky. It is believed that there is a tunnel (Underground way) in the basement of the building leading to the Golkonda Fort.

Unused for quite some time, the palace was leased to the Birlas who located their Archaeological Museum in it. After more than four decades, the Birla Museum moved out and the building is now under the management of St. Joseph's Education Society], which has bought the building in the year 2000. They have added a new four-storied building, in front of the villa.

== Design ==
It is based on Gothic architecture and is in the shape of a European medieval castle. The granite turrets and arched windows of Asman Garh palace stand out.

A granite structure in Gothic style, the compact building is too small to technically qualify as a palace, let alone the European castle which no doubt inspired its construction. Its claim as a palace is however justified by its architectural style and lofty location on a high plinth. The entrance is approached by a pair of simple symmetrical staircases which lead up to a verandah with painted arches springing from slender Corinthian columns. The painted arch is repeated in the window openings. The multi-level terraced roof is topped with castellated battlements, which form the parapet and are the most noticeable of its architectural elements. When the 7th Nizam Mir Osman Ali Khan inherited the palace he added a unique arched gateway in the shape of the Royal Dastar (turban-like headgear, part of Hyderabad court dress and a symbol of the state).
