= Nawab Abu'l Fateh Khan =

Indian nobleman from the House of Paigah

Abu'l Fateh Khan Bahadur, Taigh Jang Bahadur
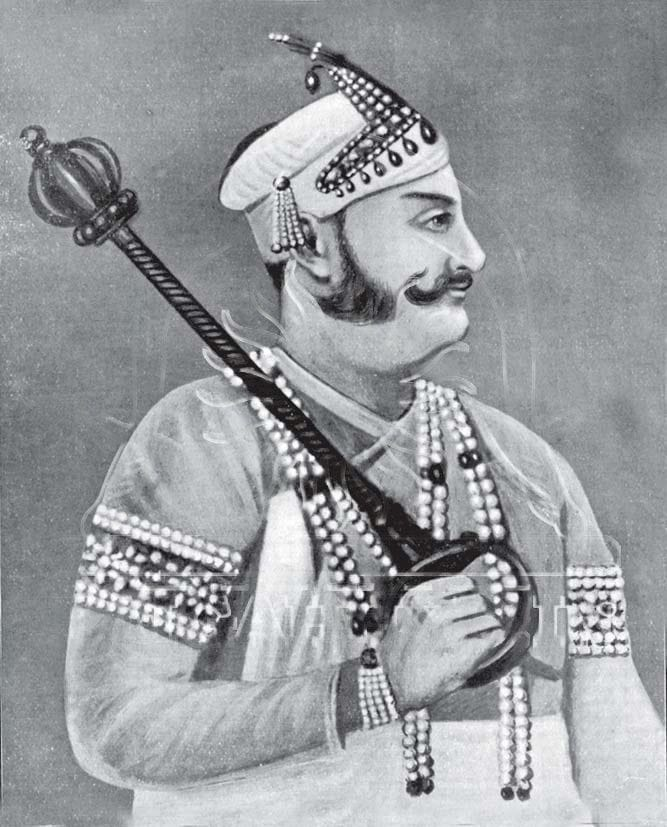
- Resting place: Paigah Tombs
- Title: Shams ul-Umara Shams ul-Mulk Shams ud-Daula Abu’l Khair Khan II
- Successor: Nawab Abu'l Fakhr
- Father: Abu'l Khair Khan, Shamsher Bahadur, Imam Jang
- Family: House of Paigah

Nawab Muhammad Abu'l Fateh Khan Bahadur, Taigh Jang Bahadur (death 1791) was an Indian nobleman and founder of the House of Paigah. He was also known as Abu'l Khair Khan II and conferred with the titles Shams ul-Umara, Shams ul-Mulk, Shams ud-Daula, and Imam Jung III.

== Ancestry ==
Abu'l Fateh Khan was the thirteenth direct descendant of Shaikh Fariduddin Ganjshakar, a Punjabi Muslim Sufi whose lineage is traced to Omar bin Al-Khattab, the second Caliph of Islam.

Abu'l Fateh Khan's father was Nawab Muhammad Abu'l Khair Khan, Imam Jung I, the governor of Shikohabad under the Mughal Emperor Aurangzeb. Abu'l Khair Khan was granted the hereditary title of Khan and rose to the command of an Imperial mansab of 2,500 zat under Emperor Aurangzeb; his statesmanship was noticed by Nizam-ul-Mulk, who appointed him as Deputy Governor of Malwa and Khandesh. He had two sons: the first was Abu'l Barakat Khan, Imam Jung II, who was shot to death during his father's lifetime; the second was Abu'l Fateh Khan, Imam Jung III.

== Life and career ==
Abu'l Fateh Khan commanded several battles, including the Battle of Udgir (1760) against Balaji Baji Rao Peshwa III, the Campaign Adoni against Tipu Sultan 1200 H (1781), and the Battle of Nirmal (1783) against Ehtasham Jung (Zafar ud Dowla Dhaunsa). He also accompanied Nizam Ali Khan Asaf Jah II in all his campaigns.

Abu'l Fateh Khan died at Pongel while on his way to face Tipu Sultan during the 2nd Mysore War on 1 January 1791. He is buried in the Paigah Tombs.

== Personal life ==
Abu'l Fateh Khan married Ladli Begum Sahiba, the second daughter of his cousin, Muhammad Amjad Khan Bahadur. They had a son named Amir e Kabir Shams-ul-Umra I.

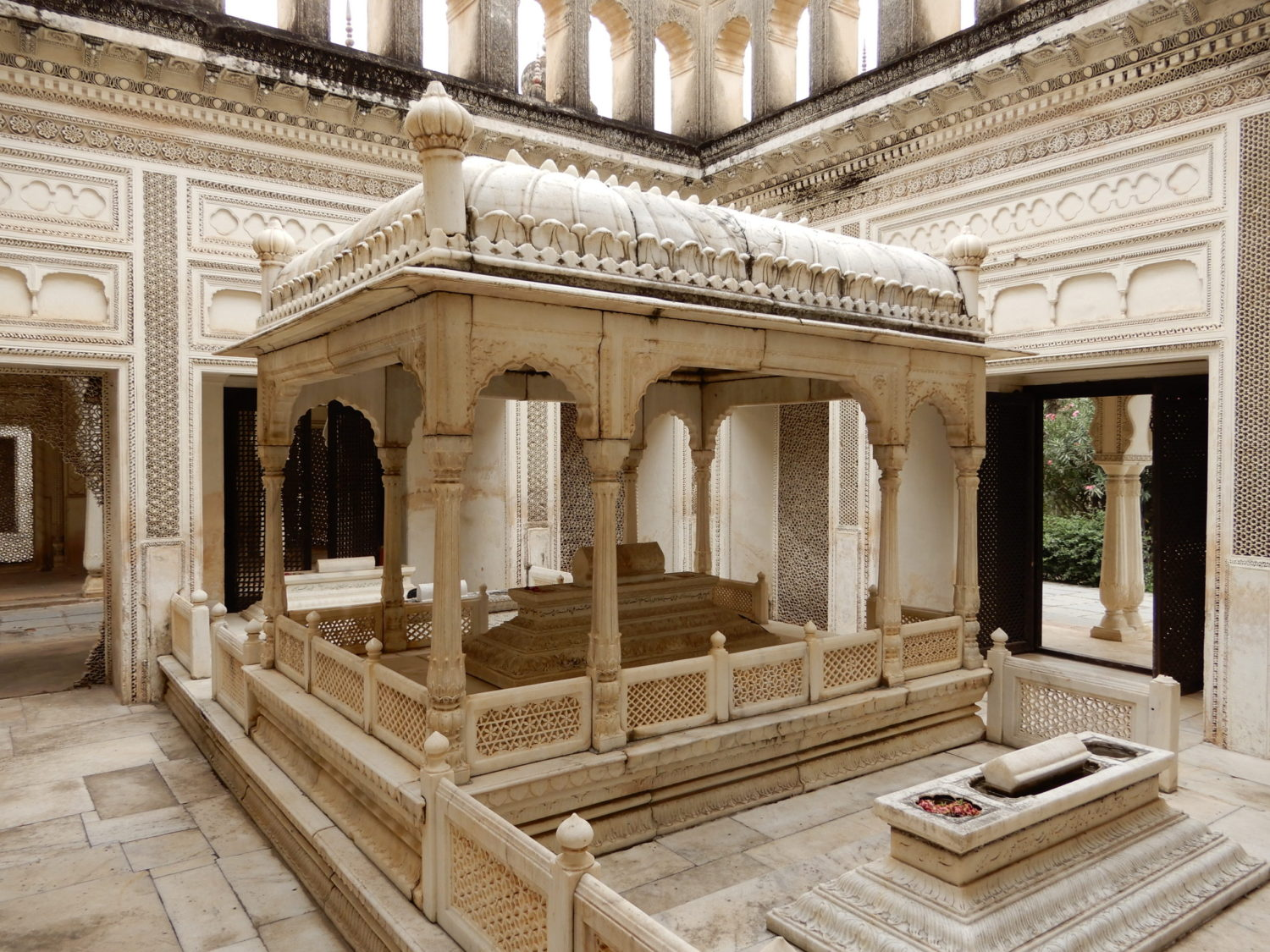
Tomb of Abu'l Fateh Khan

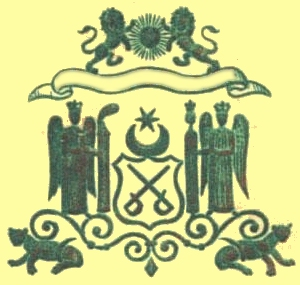
Paigah coat of arms

== Legacy ==
After the death of Abu'l Fateh Khan, his son inherited his titles and estate and married Sahibzadi Bashir unnisa Begum Sahiba, the youngest daughter of Nizam Ali Khan Asaf Jah II. This began the tradition of the Nizam's daughters marrying noble young men from the House of Paigah. These men also served as Amirs, holding honorary monarchal standards behind the Nizam.

Nawab Abu'l Fateh Khan's descendants include his great-grandson Asman Jah, who served as Prime Minister of Hyderabad and Amir. He built the Mahboob Chowk Clock Tower, Falaknuma Palace, and the Spanish Mosque.

== See also ==
- Asman Jah
- Khurshid Jah Bahadur
- Viqar-ul-Umra

== Sources ==
- "Paigah Tombs | Hyderabad District, Government of Telangana | India".
- "Journal: Humanities, Section A., Volumes 33–36.". University of Madras. 1961. p. 141.
- History of modern Deccan, 1720/1724-1948: Volume 1
- The Marathas 1600–1818, Band 2 by Stewart Gordon p. 169
- Hasan, Mohibbul (1971). History of Tipu Sultan (2nd ed.). Calcutta: THE WORLD PRESS PRIVATE LTD. p. 291.
- Lethbridge, Sir Roper (2005). The Golden Book of India: A Genealogical and Biographical Dictionary of the Ruling Princes, Chiefs, Nobles, and Other Personages, Titled Or Decorated of the Indian Empire. Aakar Books. ISBN 978-81-87879-54-1.
