= Paigah =

Paigah may refer to:

- House of Paigah, the senior nobility of Hyderabad State aristocracy
- Paigah, Punjab, a town in the Punjab Province of Pakistan
