= Hayrettin =

Hayrettin may refer to:

== People ==
- Hayreddin Barbarossa (ca. 1478 – 1546), Turkish privateer and Ottoman admiral
- Hayrettin Yerlikaya (born 1981), Turkish footballer
- Hakan Hayrettin (born 1970), Turkish/English footballer
- Hayrettin Karaoğuz (born 1984) or just Hayrettin, Turkish comedian.

== Places ==
- Sancaktar Hayrettin Mosque, Mosque in Istanbul
- Gölcük Barbaros Hayrettin Lisesi, public high school in Gölcük, Kocaeli, Turkey
- Kheïr Eddine, a town in Mostaganem Province, Algeria.
- Hayredin, a village in Bulgaria

== See also ==
- Khair ad-Din (disambiguation)
- Hajrudin
