= Amir e Kabir Shams-ul-Umra I =

H.E Fakhr Uddin Khan Bahadur Shams-Ul-Umra I
- Born: Abul Fakhr Muhammad Fakhruddin Khan; 1780
- Died: 1863
- Burial place: Paigah Tombs
- Title: Shams ul-Umara, Amir-i-Kabir, Khurshid ul-Mulk, Khurshid ud-Daula, Nawab Imam Jang [‘Abu’l Khair Khan III]

Abu'l Fakhr Muhammad Fakhruddin Khan (1780–1863), also called Amir e Kabir Shams-ul-Umra I, was an Indian nobleman. He was the first member of the House of Paigah to be matrimonially allied to the House of Asaf Jah. His full name with titles was Shams ul-Umara, Amir-i-Kabir, Khurshid ul-Mulk, Khurshid ud-Daula, Nawab ‘Abu’l Fakhr Muhammad Fakhr ud-din Khan Bahadur, Imam Jang [‘Abu’l Khair Khan III]; he became The First Amir of the House of Paigah, the Paigah Amirs held the honorary monarchal (standard) behind the Nizam of Hyderabad and were the highest order nobility. Paigah members were said to be richer than average Maharajas and had their own standing army, palaces, and courts

== Biography ==
Shams-Ul-Umra l was the only son of Nawab Abu'l Fateh Khan. He inherited his father's estate and titles. In 1797 he married Bashir unisa Begum, the daughter of Nizam Ali Khan, Asaf Jah II. He served as Prime Minister under Nawab Nasir-ud-Daula Bahadur for six months. Soon He retired to join the army. he was patron of arts and literature and adviser to the three nizams in whose time he lived.

== Architecture ==
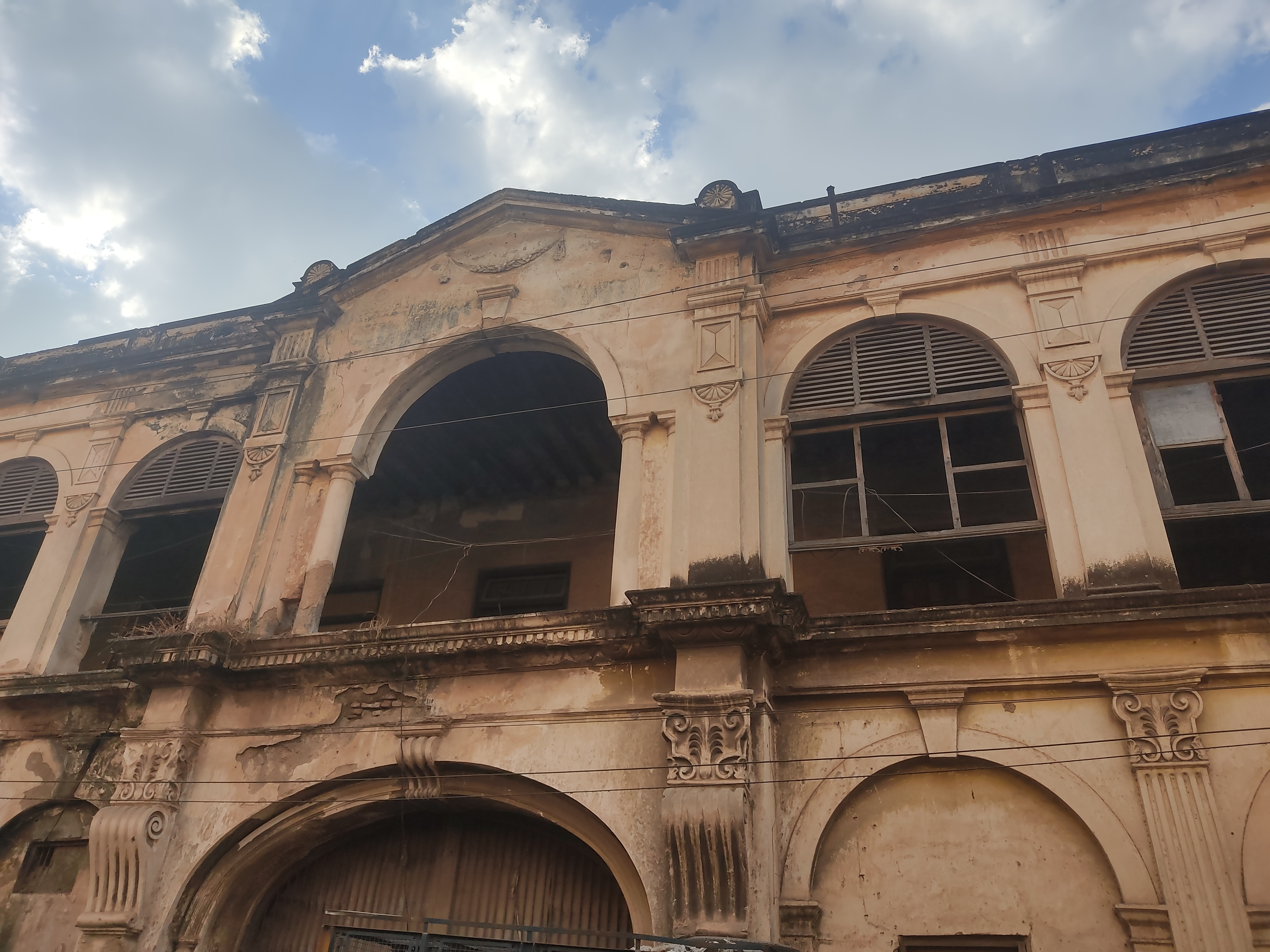
Devdi Iqbal ud-Dowla

Shams-Ul-Umra I built Devdi Iqbal ud-Dowla in the late 18th century. The Paigah Tombs, which were constructed in the late 17th century, converted into a family maqbara by him. and Janahuma Palace which served as palace for him and had guest house, separate barracks for his servants, security, and had huge carpet area for standing cavalry and infantry troops

== Death and family ==
Shams-ul-Umra l died in 1862 at the age of 85. He had many sons but only 2 were survived Shams Ul-Umara II, Nawab Rafi uddin Khan Bahadur, Namwar Jang and Shams-ul-Umara III, Nawab Muhammad Rashid Uddin Khan Bahadur Jang.

Shams-ul-Umra II who was the second Amir (head of the family) of House of Paigah Shams-Ul-Umra III who later became the 3rd Amir (head of the family) of House of Paigah and served as Co-Regent of Hyderabad with Salar Jung I

== Estate and Amirs ==
The Paigah estate was equally split between two sons of Amir e Kabir, and after their death the estate was split again between their sons, portion of the Shams-Ul-Umra II was inherited by Asman Jah, and the portion of shams-ul-Umra III was inherited by his two sons Khursheed Jah and Viqar-ul-Umra, hence forth the 3 states were called Asman Jahi Paigah Estate, Khursheed Jahi Paigah Estate, Viqar-ul-Umrahi Paigah Estate and it was decided then by Nizam that there would be no more division of the estates and each member of the estate will have their own Amir.
