= Nebahat =

- Gender: Female
- Language: Arabic; Turkish; Urdu

Origin
- Origin: Arabic
- Meaning: "vigilance", "wakefulness", "famous greatness", "honor"
- Region of origin: Middle East

Other names
- Alternative spelling: Nabahat, Nibahat

Nebahat or Nabahat is a feminine Turkish given name of Arabic origin meaning awakened or honor.

Notable people with the name include:

- Nebahat Çehre (born 1944), Turkish actress, singer, and model
- Nebahat Akkoç (born 1955), Turkish women's rights activist
- Nebahat Albayrak (born 1968), Turkish-Dutch politician
- Nabahat Jah Begum, one of the daughters of Muhammad Khair ud-din Mirza, Khurshid Jah Bahadur recognised as head of the Timurid dynasty in India
