= House of Paigah =

Noble family in the senior aristocracy of Hyderabad State

- Noble family
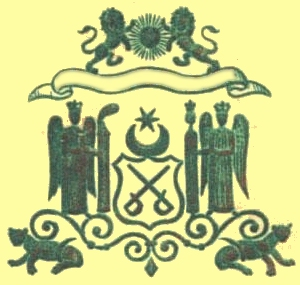
- Country: Hyderabad State
- Founder: Nawab Abu'l Fateh Khan
- Titles: Shams ul-Umara. Amir-i-Kabir. Bahadur. Imam Jang. Umdat-ud-Daula. Umdat-ul-Mulk. Namwar Jang. Umdat-ul-Mulk. Shams-ud-Daula. Shams-ul-Mulk. Amir-i-Akbar. Azam-ul-Umara. Rifa’at Jang. Inayat Jang. Waliyat Jang. Viqar ul-Umara. Iqtaidar ul-Mulk. Iqtaidar ud-Daula. Secundar Jang. Sultan ul-Mulk.
- Members: Asman Jah and his son Moin-ud-Daula Bahadur Asman Jah, Zahir Yar Jung Viqar-ul-Umra and his son Sultan ul Mulk Khursheed Jah
- Connected families: Asaf Jahi dynasty Salar Jung family Pataudi family Talpur dynasty Qu'aiti Sultanate
- Properties: Devdi Iqbal ud-Dowla Asman Garh Palace Paigah Tombs Paigah Palace Vikhar Manzil
- Dissolution: 1948

Paigah family was a noble family from the former Hyderabad State. The family maintained their own court, individual palaces, and a standing army of about fourteen thousand infantry and cavalry troops.

== History ==
The word Paigah, which means pomp and rank in Persian, was a title given by the second Nizam of Hyderabad to Nawab Abu'l Fateh Khan Tegh Jung Bahadur in appreciation of the royal services rendered by him. (According to many scholars, the first half of the word "Pai" refers to "Foot" and the remaining half "Gah" refers to "the place to rest on.") The Paigahs were known to be close to the Nizams and were the army Chieftains. They were also reported to have a marital alliance with Asaf Jahi Family. Many Paigah men married the women of the Nizam's family. Nawab Abu'l Fateh Khan Tegh Jung Bahadur was also conferred with the titles of Shams-ul-Umra ("The Sun among Nobles"), Shams-ul-Mulk, and Shams-ud-Daula. He became the founder of the Paigah family.

Shaikh Muhammad Bahauddin, who was Governor of Shikohabad under Mughal Emperor Aurangzeb, was the twelfth direct descendant of Shaikh Fariduddin Ganjshakar, a saint of the Indian subcontinent (now in Punjab, Pakistan). His ancestor had migrated from Lahore, Punjab to Shikohabad in the reign of Jalaluddin Akbar.

Abul Khair Khan, son of Shaikh Muhammad Bahauddin, was in the service of Mughal Emperor Muhammad Shah. During this time, he was bestowed the title of Khan Bahadur. His statesmanship was noticed by Nizam-ul-Mulk (the then Prime Minister of Mughal, and later founder of Asaf Jahi dynasty and known as Nizam I) and was appointed as Deputy Governor of Malwa and Khandesh. He joined Nizam on his way to Deccan and accompanied him in the battles against Maratha. During Nizam I's campaign to Delhi in the process to negotiate and stop Nadir Shah, Khan safeguarded his Nizamat in Deccan and overthrow rebellion by his son Salabat Jung. During his career under Nizam I, he was appointed as Qila Dar of Dhar (1724), Faujdar of Nabinagar, Mandu (1724), and later elevated up to Naib Subadar-Deputy Governor Khandesh and Aurangabad. He died in 1752 and was buried in Burhanpur. His titles are Khan Bahadur, Shamsher Bahadur, and Imam Jang I.

Abul Khair Khan had two sons. The elder son, Abul Barakat Khan Imam Jung II, was shot to death during the lifetime of his father while inspecting the fort near Poona, which was captured from Maratha; he is buried in Burhanpur. His second son, Abul Fateh Khan, joined the services of Nizam II. Regarded as the head of Paigah family, he was appointed to a mansab of 7,000 zat and 5000, sowar 1777, prom. to 9,000 sowars and a Paigah contingent of 12,000 troops in 1781 and received the Naubat, Naqara, and Mahi Maratib (ensigns of royalty). He constructed Nai Haveli in 1201H (1782 AD). He died at Pongel while on his way to face Tipu Sultan during the 2nd Mysore War on 1 January 1791. He is interred at Paigah Tombs beside the dargah of Beranashah Saheb. His titles at the time of his death were: Abul Fateh Khan, Abul Khair Khan II, Tegh Jung, Shums-ud-Dowlah, Shums-ul-Mulk, and Shams-ul-Umara I. He was survived by his son Shams-ul-Umra I and daughter Bibi Najeeba. He commanded the Battle of Udgir (1760 AD) against Balaji Baji Rao Peshwa III, accompanied Nizam Ali Khan Asaf Jah II in all his campaigns, commanded the Campaign Adoni against Tipu Sultan (1200 H (1781 AD)), and the Battle of Nirmal (1783 AD) against Ehtasham Jung (Zafar ud Dowla Dhaunsa).

After Abul Fateh died, his son Fakhruddin Khan inherited the estates and titles. He was given the title Amir-e-Kabir, which meant Head of the Nobles. He also married the daughter of Nizam Ali Khan, Asaf Jah II Sahebzadi Bashirunissa Begum in 1797. Thus began the tradition of marrying Nizam's daughters to young men of the Paigah family.

Fakhruddin Khan's grandson through his third son was Sir Asman Jah. Jah had one son Moin-Ud-Dowlah Bahadur Asman Jah who sired 14 sons and 7 daughters. Fakhruddin Khan's fourth son Rasheeduddin Khan had two sons, Viqar-ul-Umra and Khurshid Jah.

Nawab Mohammed Iqbaluddin Khan, son of Moin-Ud-Daula Bahadur was married to Sahebzadi Ahmed Unisa Begum, whose maternal grandfather was H.H Mahboob Ali Khan and paternal grandfather was Sultan ul-Mulk, Viqar-ul-Umrahi Iqtidar ud-Daula. He had 2 sons and 2 daughters, one of whom was Sahebzade Nawab Muhammed Hyder Uddin Khan [Hyder Nawab]. He was given this name by his uncle Mir Osman Ali Khan and was the owner of Chiraan Fort Palace, the other half of Paigah Palace.

Bashir Yar Jung, a grandson of Viqar-ul-Umra, married Saleha Sultan, the daughter of Sajida Sultan and Iftikhar Ali Khan Pataudi. Their son Saad Bin Jung is a member of the Paigah family as well as Pataudi Royal Family.

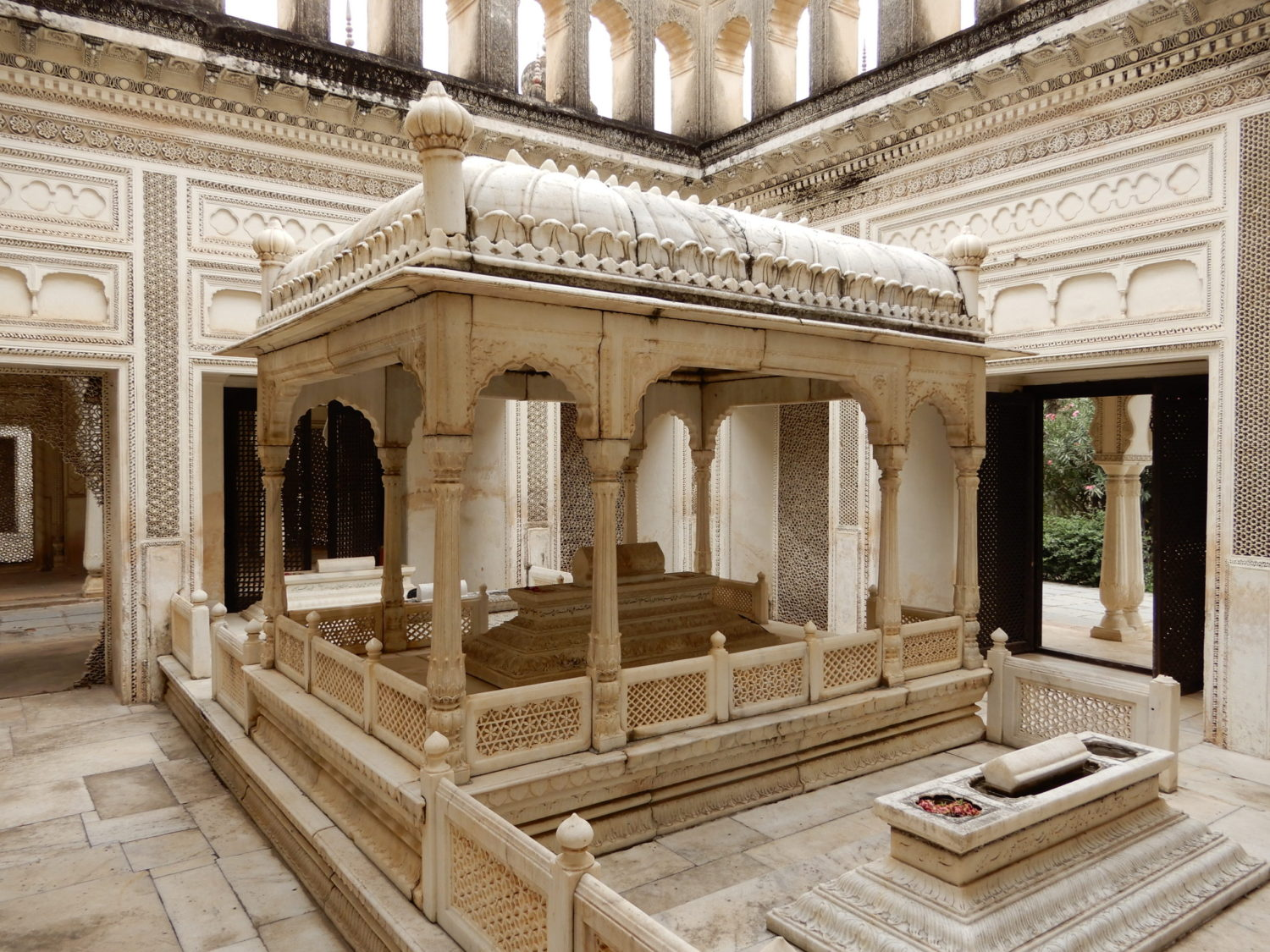
Tomb of Abu'l Fateh Khan

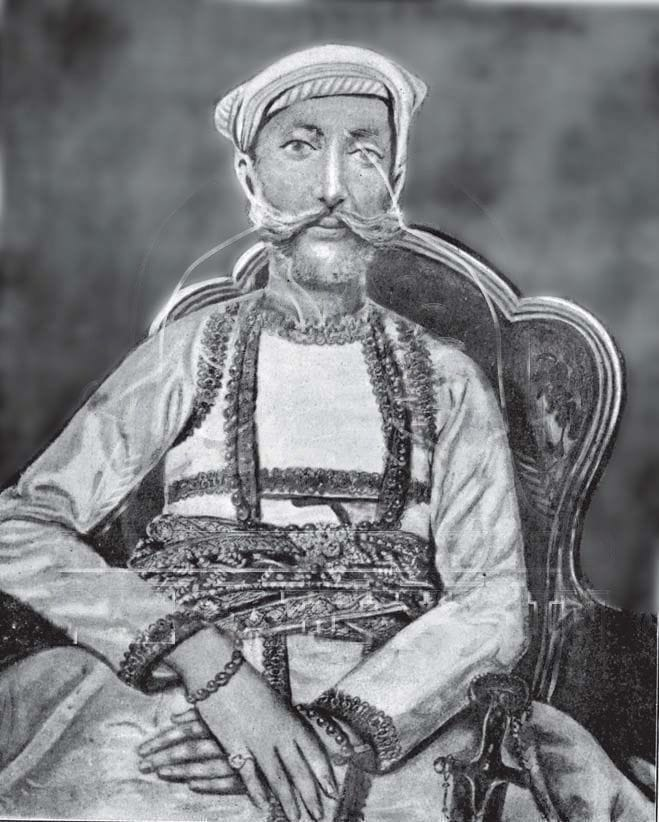
Rafiuddin Khan Shams-ul-Umra, II Prime Minister of Hyderabad

== Family and Amirs ==
Upon the death of Fakhruddin Khan Shams-ul-Umra I, the Paigah estate was divided between his two surviving sons: Rafiuddin Khan (d.1877) and Rashiduddin Khan (d.1881). Rafiuddin Khan's titles at the time of his death were: Abul Khair Khan IV, Namwar Jung, Umdat-ud-Doula, Shums-ud-Doula, Umdat-ul-Mulk, Shums-ul-Umara III, Amir-e-Kabir II. Rashiduddin Khan's titles at the time of his death were: Abul Khair Khan V, Bahadur Jung, Iqtidar-ud-Doula, Shums-ud-Doula, Iqtidar-ul-Mulk, Shums-ul-Mulk, Shums-ul-Umara IV, Viqar-ul-Umara I, Amir-e-Kabir III.

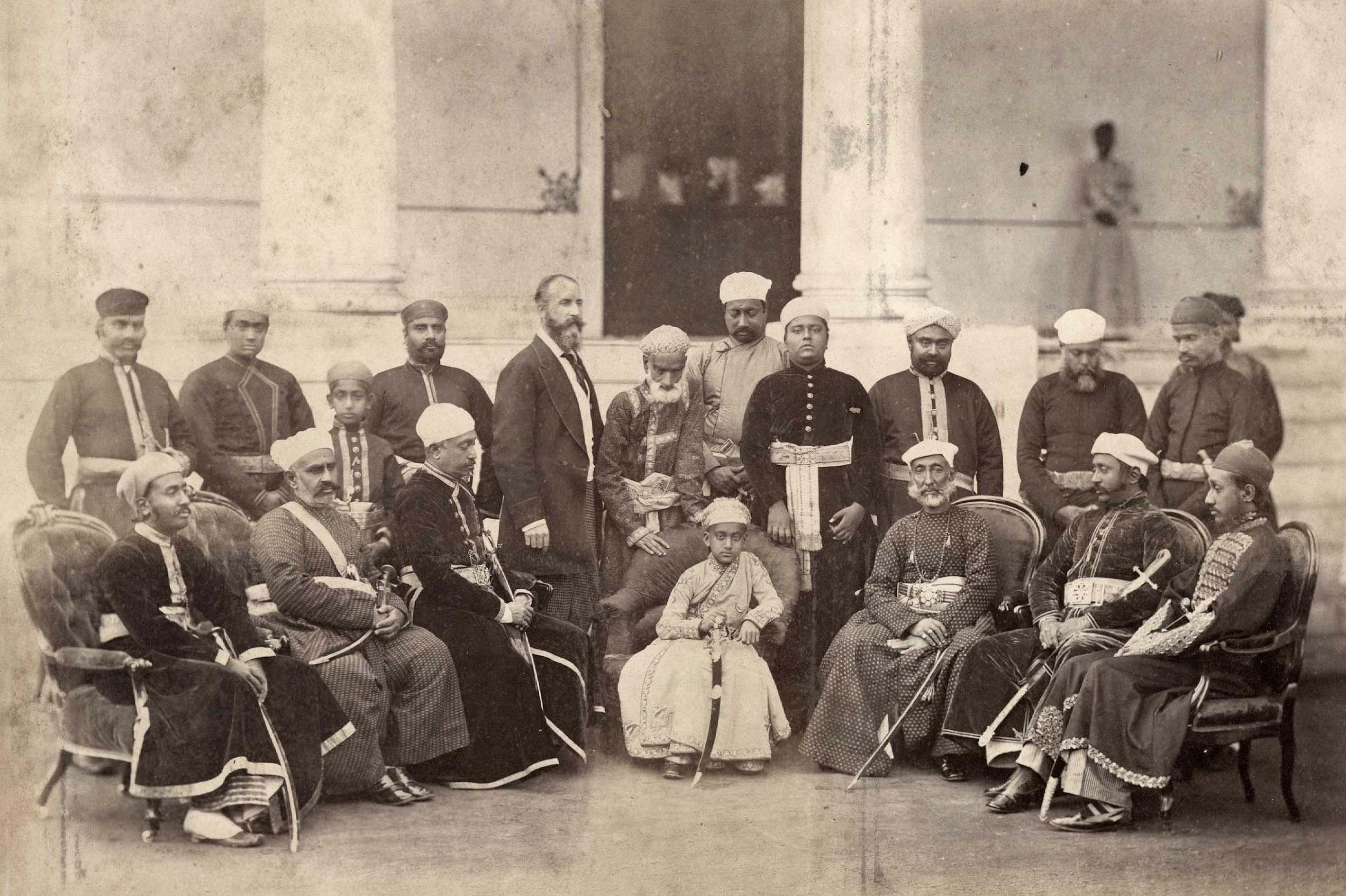
Imam Jung, Narendar Pesckar, Salar Jung I, HH Nizam Mir Mehboob Ali Khan, Nawab Rasheeduddin Khan Amir e Kabir III, Bashir-Ud-Dowla Bahadur (Nawab Sir Asman Jah Bahadur), Sir Vicar-Ul-Umra Bahadur II

When Rafiuddin Khan died in 1877, his Paigah estate was inherited by his two adopted sons - Sabaqat Jung (1839–1880) and Sir Asman Jah (1840–1898). However, when Sabaqat Jung died in 1880 without issue, his portion of the Paigah estate was divided into three parts and allocated between his younger brother Sir Asman Jah and his cousins Sir Khurshid Jah and Sir Viqar-ul-Umra. When Rashiduddin Khan died in 1881, his share of the Paigah estate was divided between his two sons Sir Khurshid Jah Bahadur (1841–1902) and Sir Viqar-ul-Umara Bahadur II (1856–1902). It was decided during this period that there would be no further divisions of the three estates. The Paigah estates were henceforth known as the Asman Jahi Paigah, Khursheed Jahi Paigah, and Viqar-ul-Umarahi Paigah.

Each of the three branches has its own Amir, appointed by the Nizam entirely at his own discretion. Preference was given to individuals whose mothers were daughters of the Nizam, provided that they were fit for the post, regardless of other seniority factors such as age. The newly appointed Amir would inherit the entire jaagir of the previous Amir and would be the ceremonial head of that branch of the Paigah family. The Nizam also had the authority to appoint one Amir from among the three Paigah Amirs to hold the honorary morchal (standard) behind the Nizam during Durbar.

According to the census of 1901, the three Paigah Estates in the Hyderabad State comprised 23 taluks dispersed over the districts of Bidar, Nander, Osmanabad, Gulbarga, Medak, Atraf-i-Balda, and Nizamabad, and a few scattered villages in Aurangabad, Warangal, Mahbubnagar, and Nalgonda, encompassing 1,273 villages, covering 4,134 square miles, over a population of 774,411 (The Imperial Gazetteer of India, vol. 1, 1909).

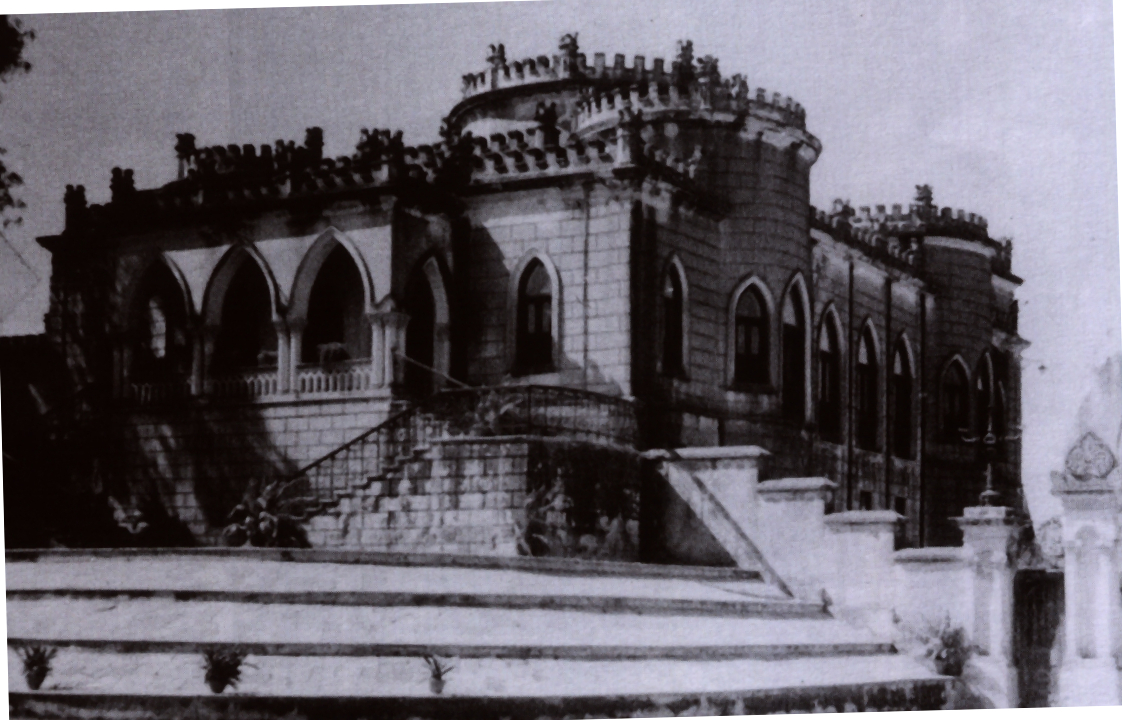
Asman Ghar Palace

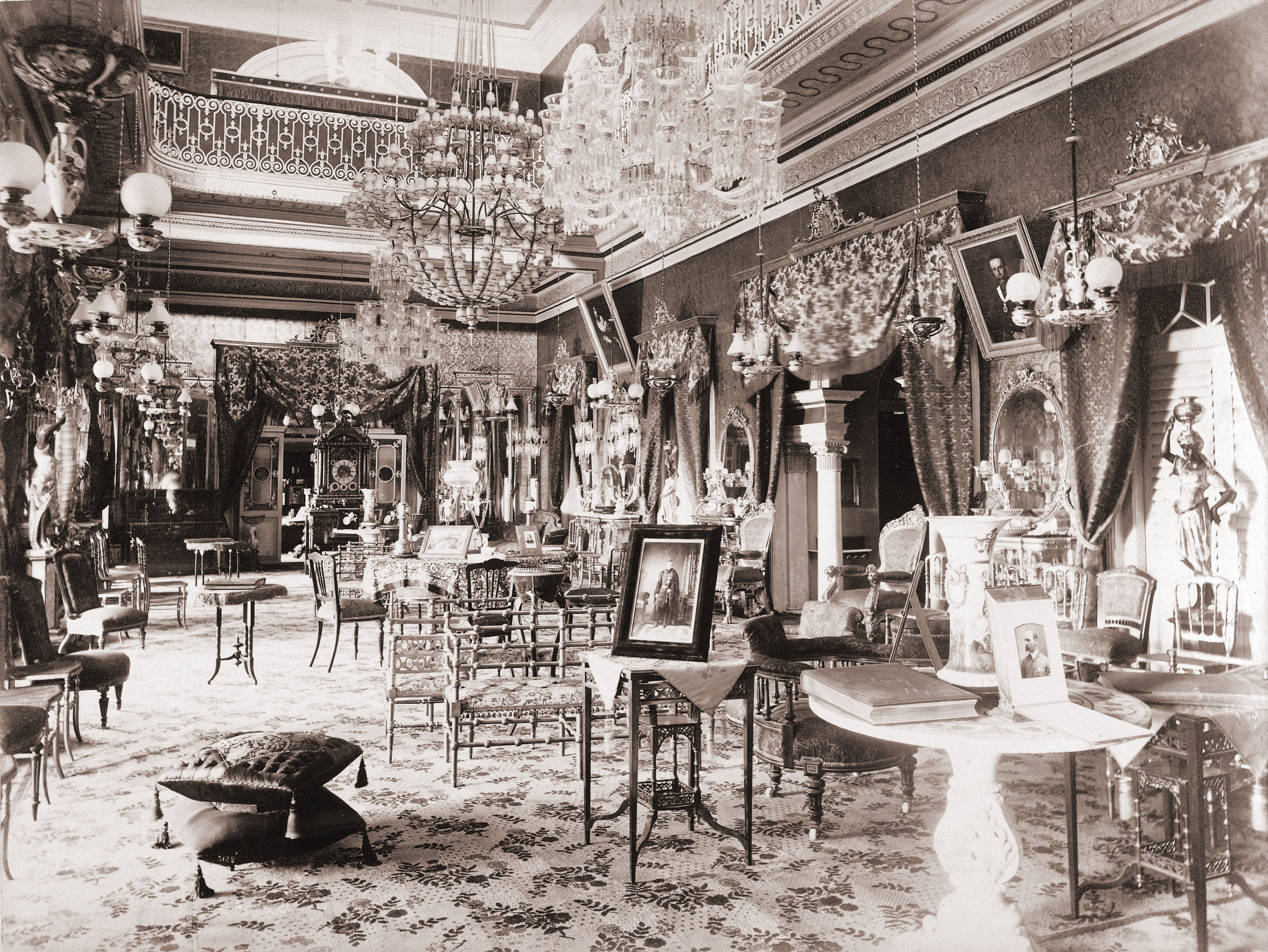
The interior of Bashir-bagh Palace

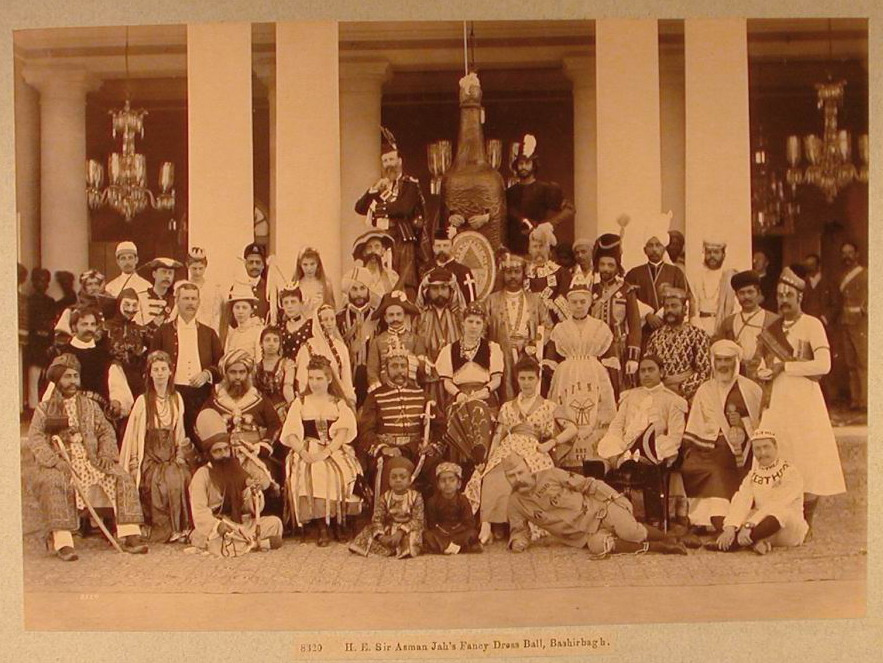
Sir Asman Jah Fancy dress party

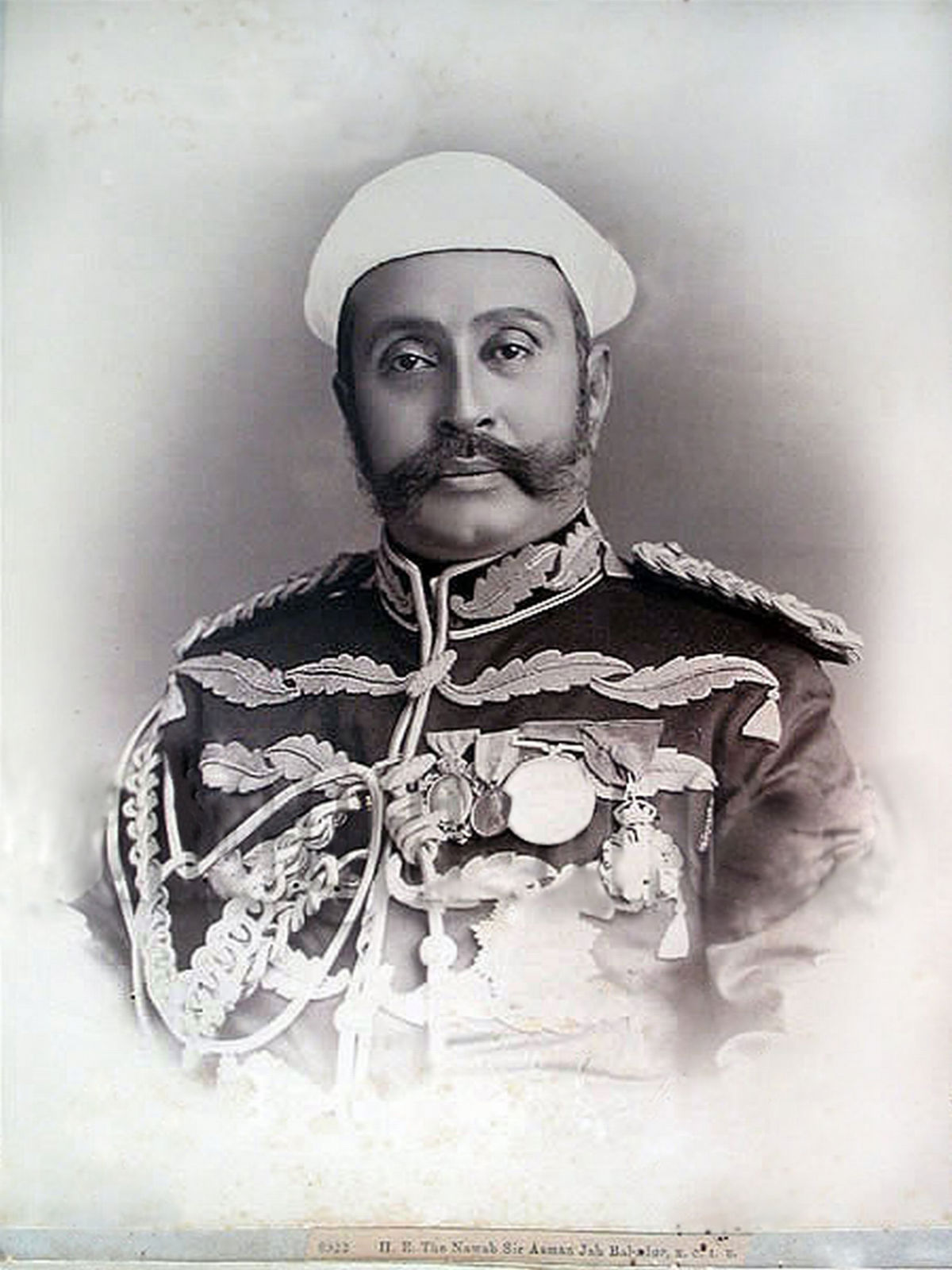
Basheer-ud-Dowla Asman Jah

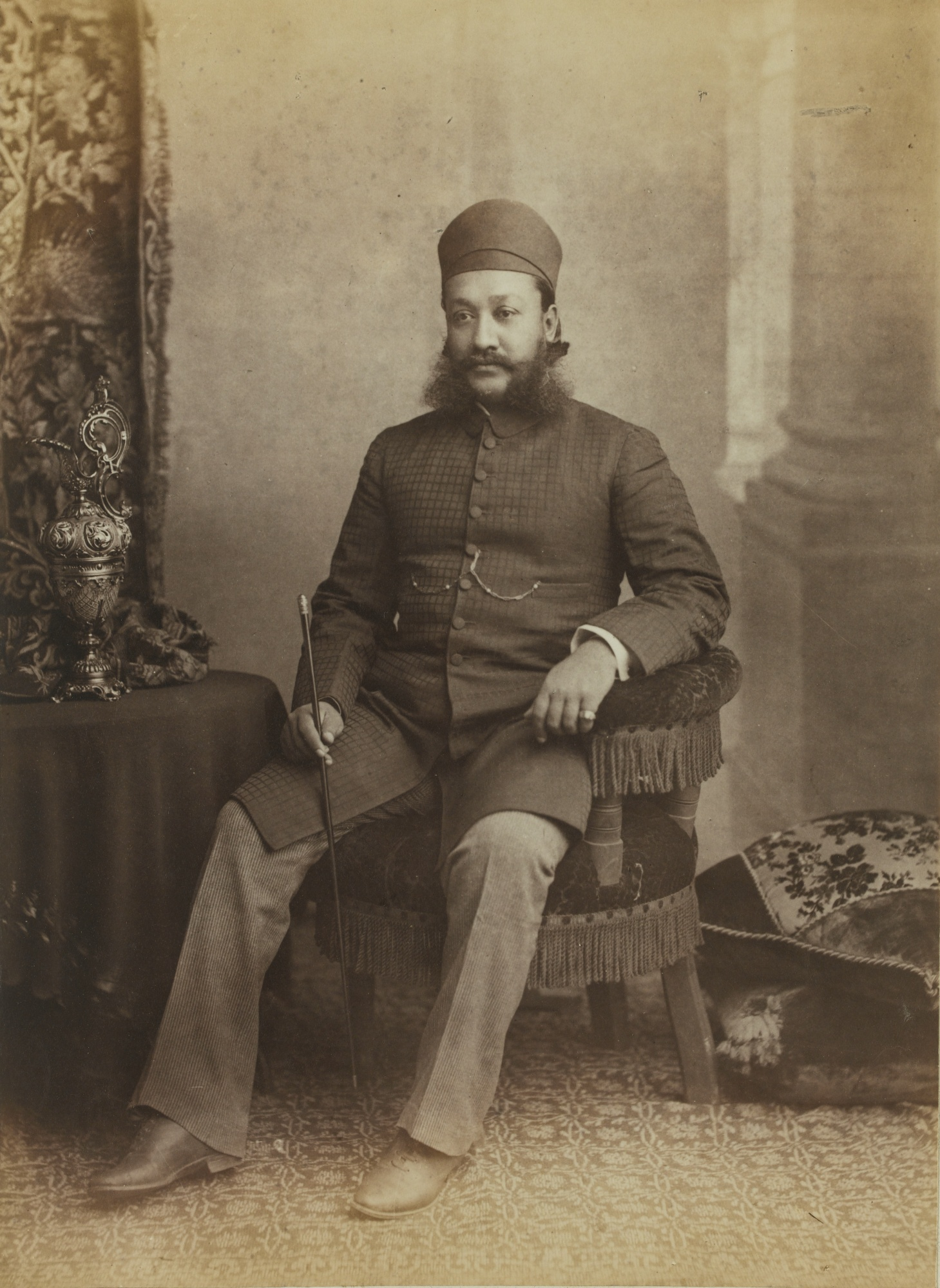
Sir Viqar-ul-Umra

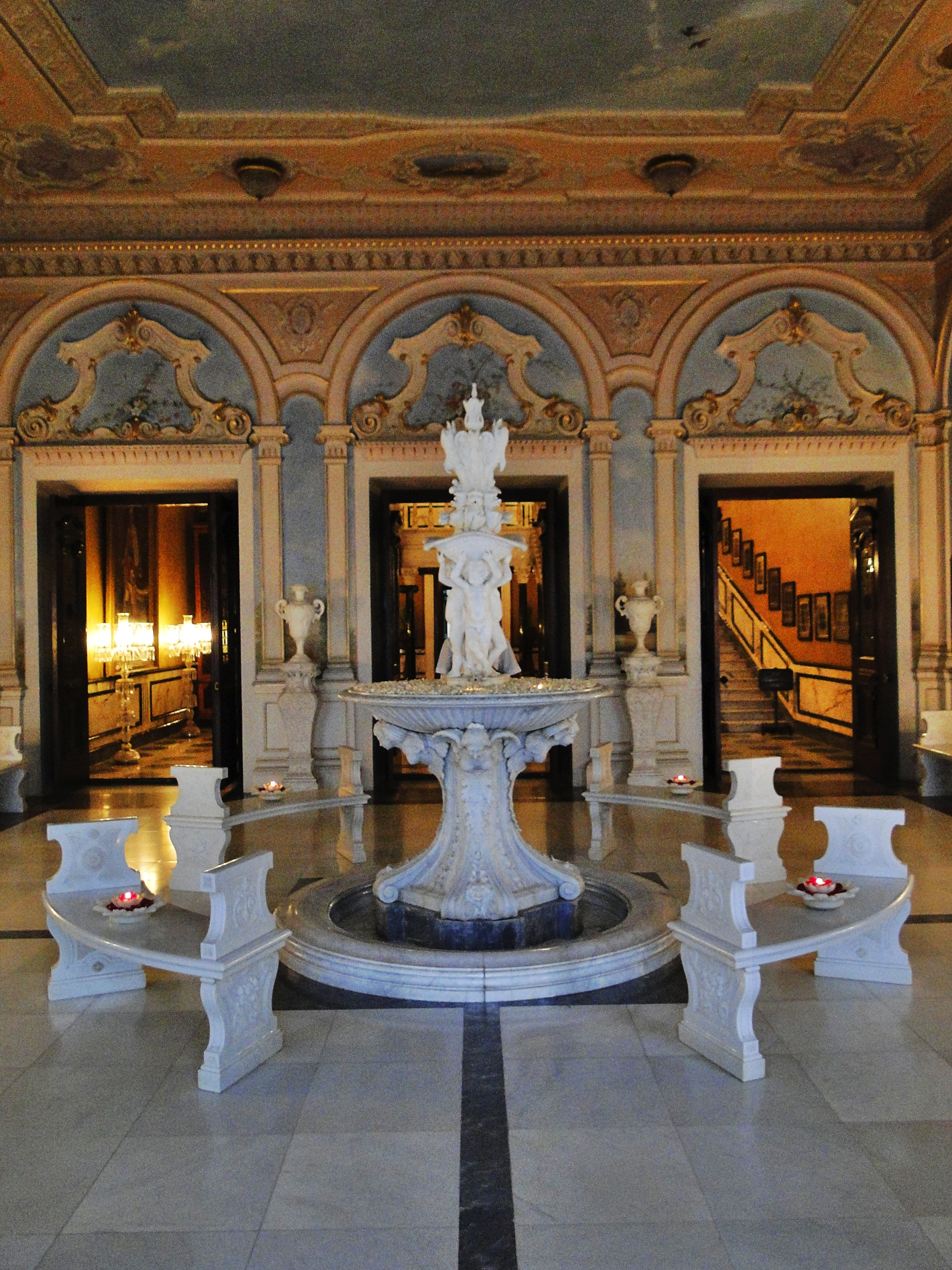
Falaknuma Palace

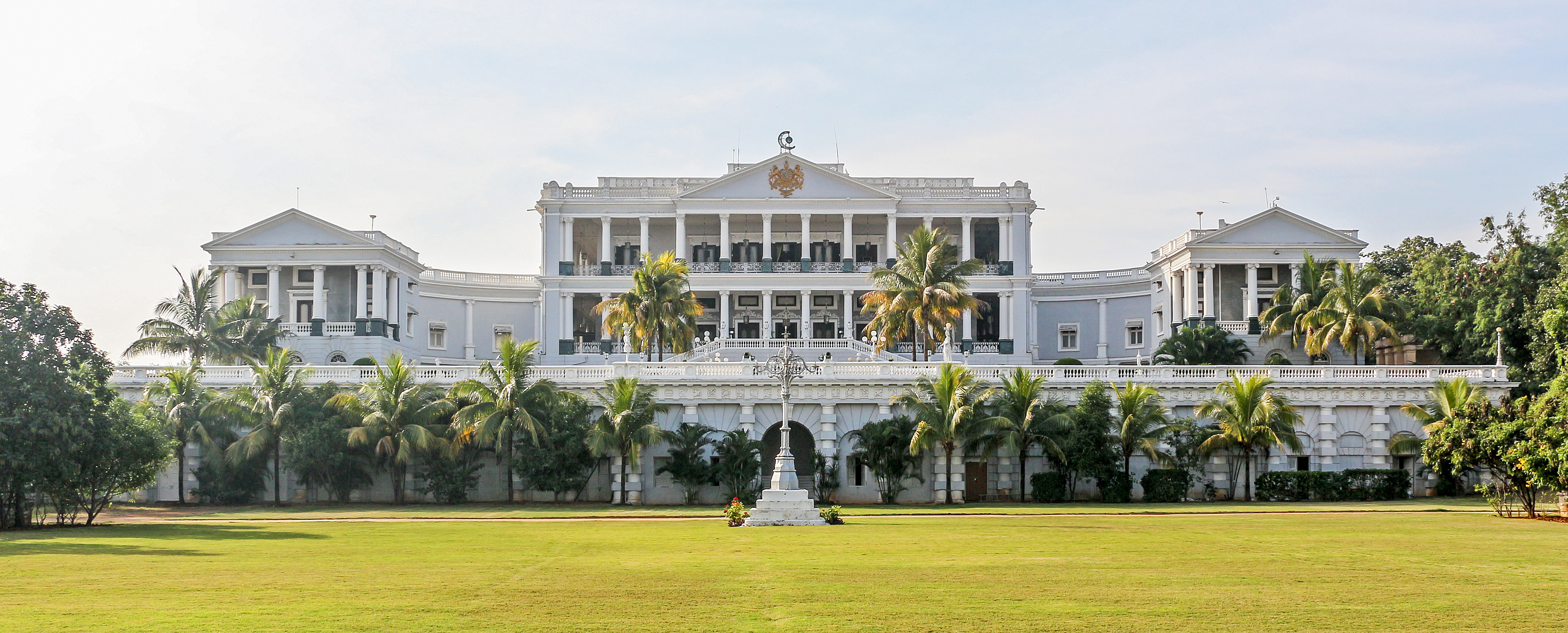
The Falaknuma Palace in Hyderabad

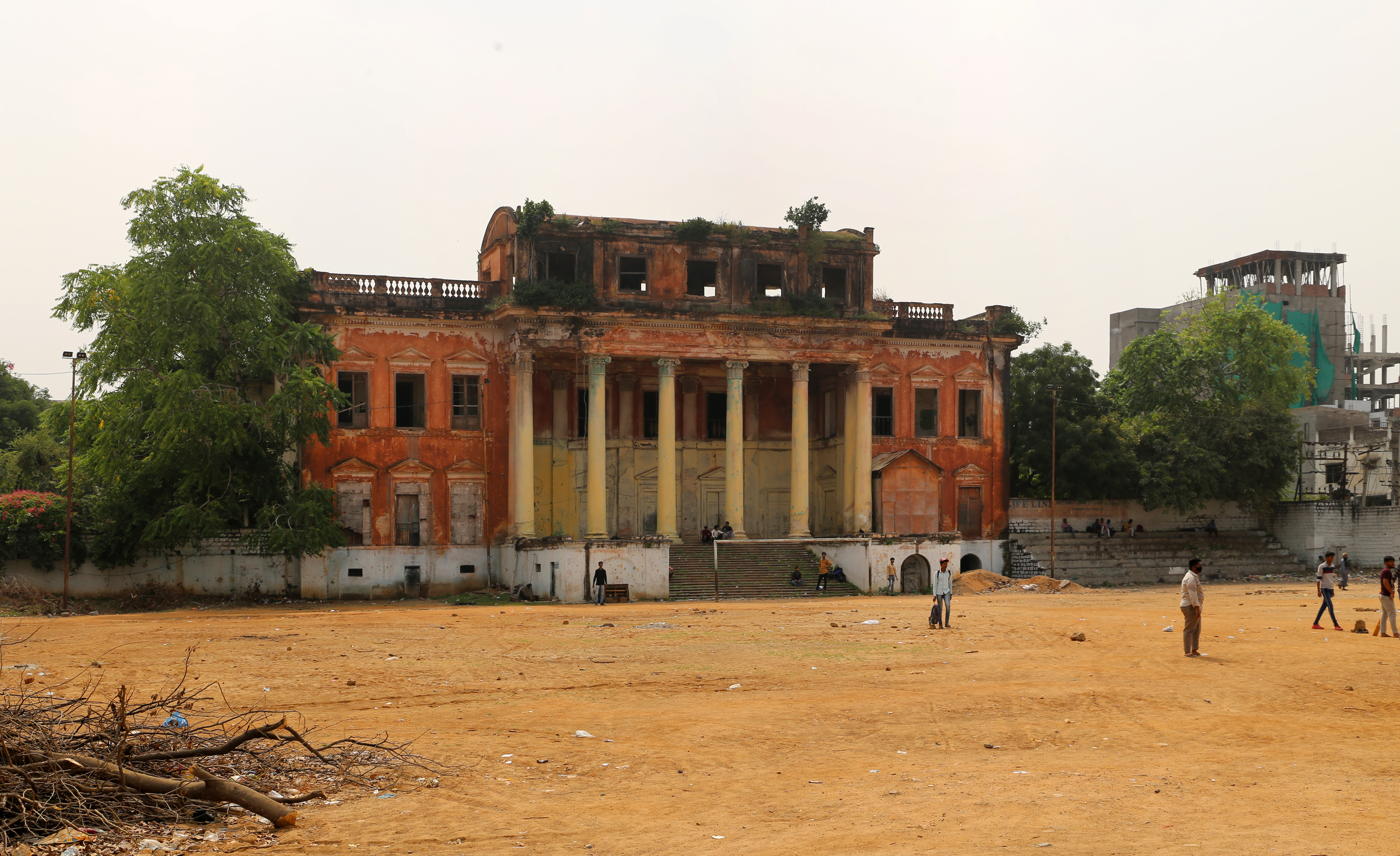
Khursheed Jah Devdi

== Family tree ==
- Asman Jah, Amir e Akbar, Nawab Sir Muhammad Mazhar ud-din Khan Bahadur, son of Nawab Sultanuddin Khan (served as Prime Minister of Hyderabad)
- Amir-e-Paigah-e-Asman Jahi, Moin-ud-Daula Bahadur Asman Jah Innayat Jung, Nawab Muhammad Moin uddin Khan Bahadur
- Viqar ul Umra II, Iqtedar-ul-Mulk, Iqbal-ud-Dowla, Sikandar Jung Amir e Paigah, Nawab Sir Muhammad Fazl ud-din Khan Bahadur (served as Prime Minister of Hyderabad - 1893 to 1901).
- Nawab Fareed Nawaz Jung Bahadur (third son of Nawab Sultan ul Mulk), married Princess Sahibzadi Ghous unnisa Begum (daughter of Mir Mahboob Ali Khan Asaf Jah VI Nizam). Their daughter Sahebzadi Ahmed unnisa Begum was a member of both Nizam and Paigah families.
- Nawabzada Muhammad Saad Bin Jung

== Relationship with the Nizams ==
The bond between the Nizams and the Paigah nobility strengthened with the marriage of Abul Fatah Khan's son Fakhruddin Khan with the daughter of Nizam Ali Khan, Asaf Jah II, Sahebzadi Bashirunissa Begum in 1797. Henceforth, Fakhruddin Khan's descendants married daughters of other Nizams and consequently, in protocol, the Paigahs were considered next only to the Nizams. The Paigah jagir was the largest in the state, second only to the Nizam.

The Paigah nobility, being sons-in-law and brothers-in-law to the Nizams, were to a certain extent above the law. The local police and courts did not have personal or in rem jurisdiction over their persons or property. They were subject only to the jurisdiction of the Nizam.

== Tombs ==
The Paigah Tombs are the tombs belonging to the nobility of Paigah family. They were constructed over a period of time during the 18th, 19th and 20th centuries. They are located in the Santoshnagar locality of Hyderabad. The tombs are made of lime and mortar with beautiful inlaid marble carvings.

== Places Named after the Paigah family ==
Vikarabad, a town in Telangana, is named after H.E Viqar-ul-Umra, and the town of Shamshabad, which houses the Rajiv Gandhi International Airport, is also named after The Shams-ul-umra family. Moinabad was named after Nawab Moin-Ud-Daula Bahadur Asman Jahi. The area of Begumpet was gifted to the Paigah family, when Abul Fateh Khan's son Fakhr uddin Khan married the daughter of Nizam Ali Khan, Asaf Jah II Sahebzadi Bashirunissa Begum. Basheerbagh is named after H E Sir Asman Jah Bahadur Basheer ud Daula. Begumpet, shaikpet originally Jahandar Bagh Named after Lady Viqar-ul-Umra wife of Viqar-ul-Umra daughter of Afzal-ud-Daulah the Vth Nizam of hyderabad, Rashidguda Named after Rashid Uddin Khan,

Zaheerabad in Telangana is named after Nawab Zahir Yar Jung, Amir e Paigah Asman Jah.

== Paigah Deodis and Estate ==
The Paigah noblemen were known for their residences, usually known as Devdis. Bashir Bagh Palace belonged to Sir Asman Jah, a Paigah Amir and Prime Minister of Hyderabad (1887–1893). Sir Vicar-ul-Umra, the Paigah Amir and the then prime minister of Hyderabad state 1894–1901 (also officiated as prime minister in 1893) presented Falaknuma palace in 1897, easily one of the most opulent palaces in the country, to the sixth Nizam, Mir Mahbub Ali Khan. after the annexation of Hyderabad State into india the paigah estate became one of the biggest high profile and longest running civil suit for an estate in the country known as C.S 7 of 1958 and C.S 14 of 1958 20,000 to 30,000 of acres of lands and jewellery worth millions

Other important Paigah Palaces were:

- Asman Garh Palace
- Paigah Palace
- Khursheed Jah Devdi
- Vikhar Manzil
- Devdi Iqbal ud-Dowla
- Basheer Bagh Palace
- Jahanuma Palace
- Khana Bagh City Palace
- Vilayat Manzil
- Vikhar Manzil
- Parwarish bagh palace
- Begumpet Paigah House Zaheer Yar Jung
- Saroornagar Devdi

Name	titular
	Abu'l Fateh Khan Tegh Jung Bahadur [Imam Jung II] [‘Abu’l Khair Khan II]
Abu'l Fakr, Fakhr Uddin Khan	Shams ul-Umara, Amir-i-Kabir, Khurshid ul-Mulk, Khurshid ud-Daula, Nawab Imam Jang III [‘Abu’l Khair Khan III]
Nawab Rafi ud-din Khan Bahadur,	Amir-i-Kabir, Shams ul-Umara, Umdat ud-Daula, Umdat ul-Mulk, Namwar Jang [Muhammad Abu’l Khair Khan IV]
Nawab Muhammad Rashid uddin Khan Bahadur Jang	Amir-i-Kabir, Shams ul-Umara, Viqar ul-Umara, Iqtaidar ul-Mulk, Iqtaidar ud-Daula [Muhammad Abu’l Khair Khan V]
Nawab Sir Muhammad Muhi ud-din Khan Bahadur, Taigh Jang	Khurshid Jah, Shams ul-Umara, Amir-i-Kabir, Khurshid ul-Mulk, Khurshid ud-Daula [Muhammad Abu’l Khair Khan VI], KCIE
Nawab Sir Muhammad Mazhar ud-din Khan Bahadur	Asman Jah, Amir-i-Akbar, Azam ul-Umara, Umdat ul-Mulk, Bashir ud-Daula Rifa’at Jang, KCIE
Nawab Sir Muhammad Fazl uddin Khan Bahadur,	Viqar ul-Umara, Iqtidar ul-Mulk, Iqbal ud-Daula, Secundar Jang, KCIE
Nawab Muhammad Hafiz uddin Khan	Amir-i-Paigah-i-Khurshid Jahi, Shams ul-Mulk, Shams ud-Daula Zafar Jang,
Nawab Muhammad Mukhtar uddin Khan	Amir-i-Paigah-i-Viqar-ul-Umara, Sultan ul-Mulk, Iqtidar ud-Daula, Namdar Jang
Nawab Muhammad Muin uddin Khan	Amir-i-Paigah-i-Asman Jahi, Muin ud-Daula, Inayat Jang
Nawab Muhammad Lutf uddin Khan	Amir-i-Paigah-i-Khurshid Jahi, Lutf ud-Daula Latafat Jang
Nawab Muhammad Zahir ud-din Khan Bahadur	Amir-i-Paigah-i-Asman Jahi Zahir Yar Jung (last Amir)

== See also ==
- Falaknuma Palace
- Paigah Tombs
- Chiraan Fort Palace
- Spanish Mosque
- Mahboob Chowk Clock Tower
- Nizamia observatory
