= Paigah Palace =

Historic palace in Hyderabad, India

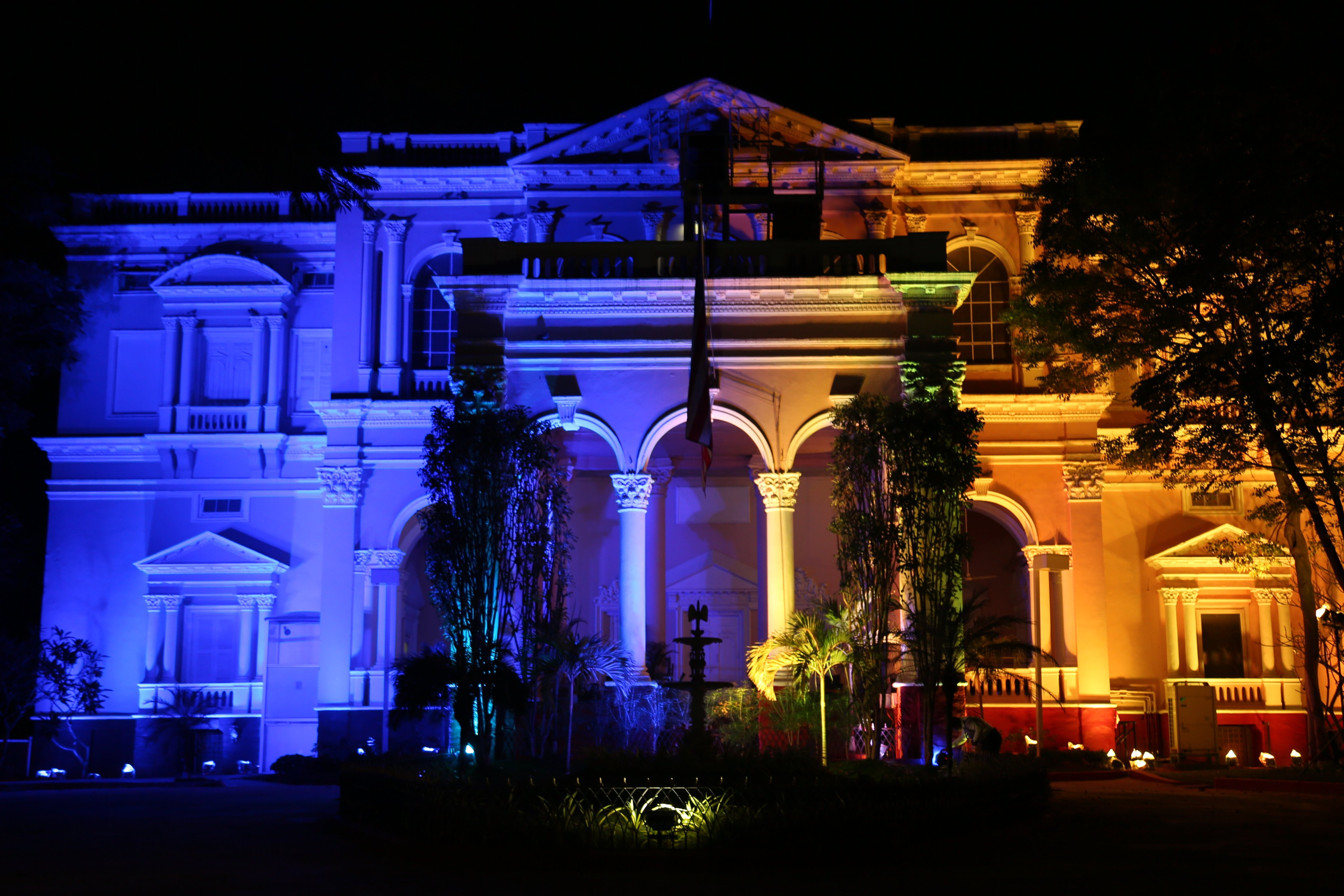
- US Consulate General in Hyderabad (Paigah Palace) lit up with the colours of Ukrainian flag to show support near the beginning of the Russo-Ukrainian war.

General information
- Location: Begumpet, Hyderabad, Telangana, India
- Named for: Paigah family
- Completed: 1900; 126 years ago

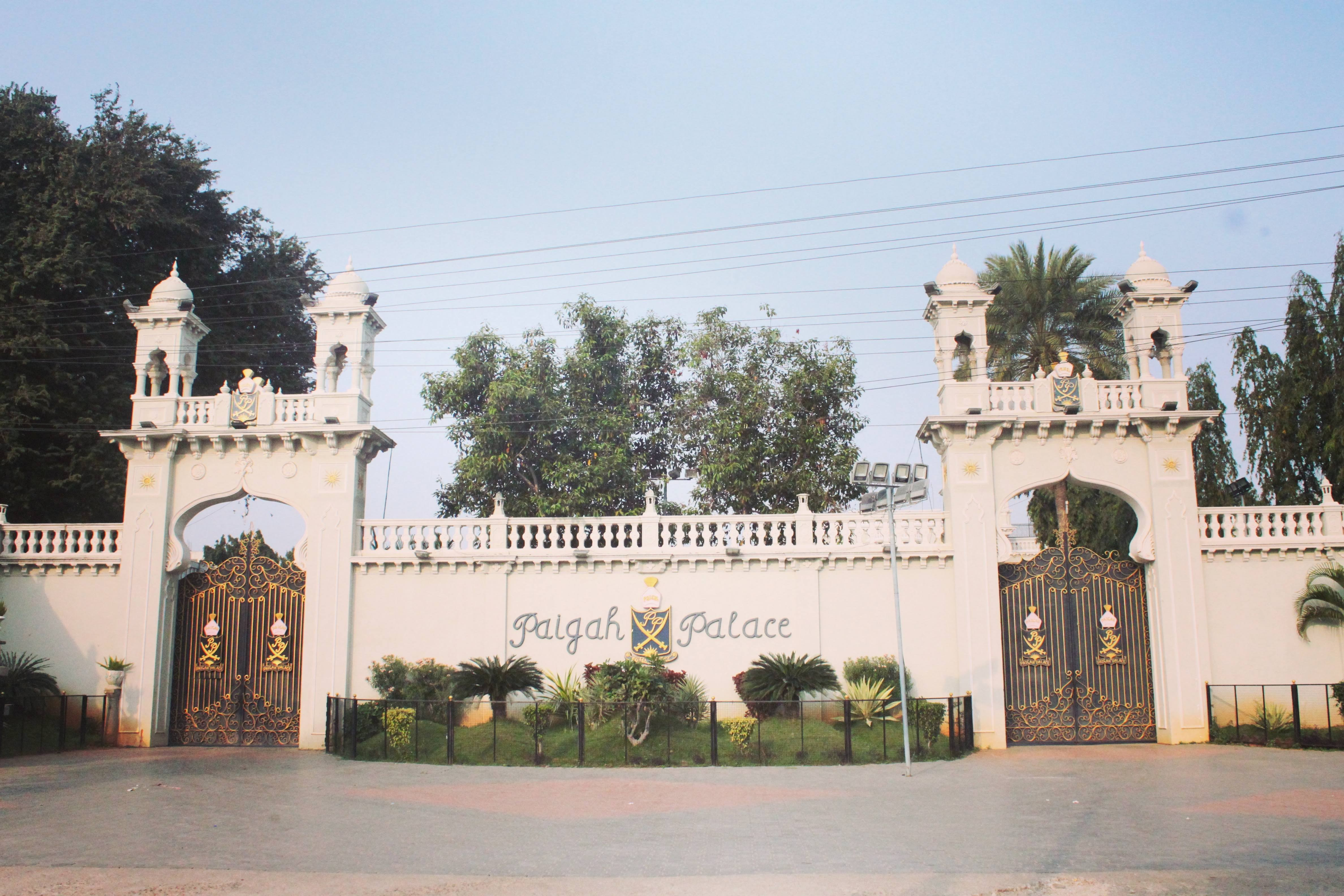
The Gate to the Paigah Palace

Paigah Palace is a palace in Hyderabad, India. It was built by Sir Vicar-ul-Umra, a Paigah nobleman. This was built after he gave the famous Falaknuma Palace to the sixth Nizam of Hyderabad state, Mahbub Ali Khan, Asaf Jah VI.

The Palace housed the Consulate General of the United States of America in Hyderabad till 15 March 2023, after which the mission began services in its new chancery at Nanakramguda.

== History ==
Between 1975 and 2008, the palace housed the office of the Hyderabad Urban Development Authority. In 1999, a four-storeyed annexe was added towards the rear side of the palace.

== Paigah Family ==
In the hierarchy of nobles of Hyderabad, the Paigah family ranked immediately next to the ruling family of Nizams.

The Paigahs were also the foremost palace builders of Hyderabad. Vikarul Umra also built the Paigah Palace in Begumpet, in 1900.

Nawab Abul Fatah Khan Bahadur, the eldest grandson of Sir Vicar ul Umra and son of Amir e Paigah H.E. Nawab Sultan ul Mulk, was the last member of the Paigah family to have lived in this Palace.

Near the Paigah Palace lies the Deoris of Nawab Muzaffar Nawaz Jung, Fareed Nawaz Jung, Nawab Nazir Nawaz Jung, Nawab Khair Nawaz Jung and Nawab Hassan Yar Jung, grandsons of Sir Vikar ul Umra and Vikhar Manzil (all these palaces were built by Sir Vicar between 1897 and 1901). The Deori of Nazir Nawaz Jung and Fareed Nawaz Jung, called Chiraan Fort Palace, is a beautiful, two-storeyed palace in Mughal style. It has wide verandas facing outwards as well as inwards overlooking a courtyard. The complex is partly converted into a club. The rest of the area is used as a residence.

== US diplomatic mission ==
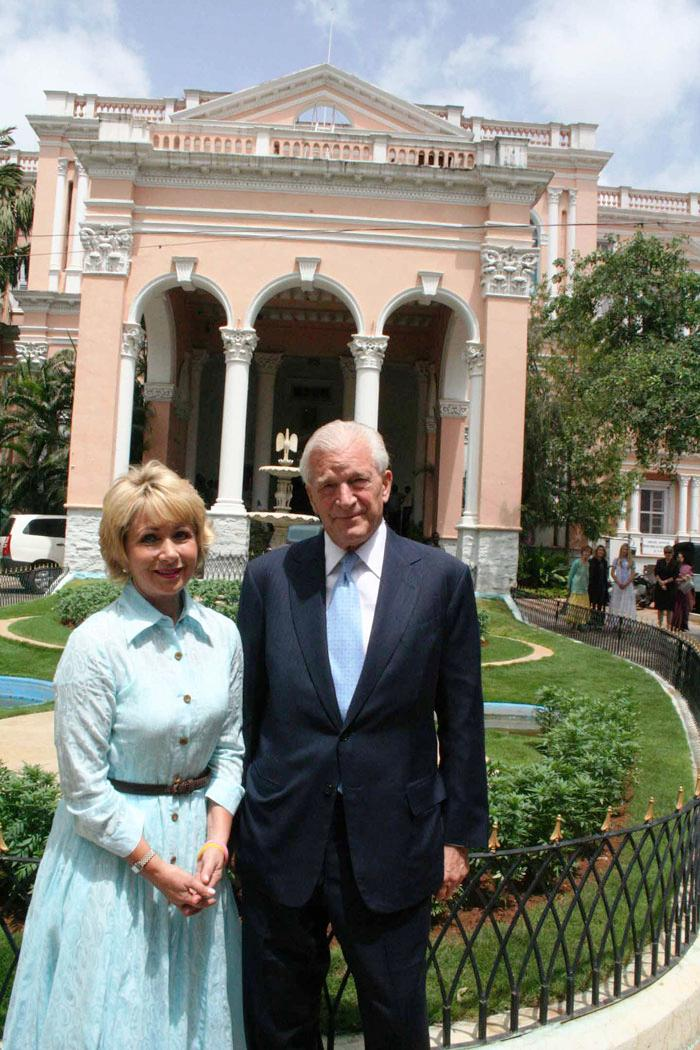
Former United States Ambassador to India, David Mulford and his wife Jeeni Mulford during their visit to the designate U.S. Consulate General at the Paigah Palace

The palace was acquired from the descendants of Vicar-ul-Umra by the Hyderabad Urban Development Authority in 1981. In 2008, the site was temporarily leased to the United States to house its consulate-general from 2008 until 2023. The preparation work required by the US included felling 42 trees for security reasons. This came in for heavy criticism from Indian environmentalists and architects for disrespecting a heritage site in a way that would not be permitted in the US.

== Description ==
The palace is spread over 4 acres of land. It is a large two-storied neo-classical building with a portico, semicircular arches, unfluted Corinthian columns, projected and pedimented windows and deep arcaded verandahs on all four sides.
