= Devdi Iqbal ud-Dowla =

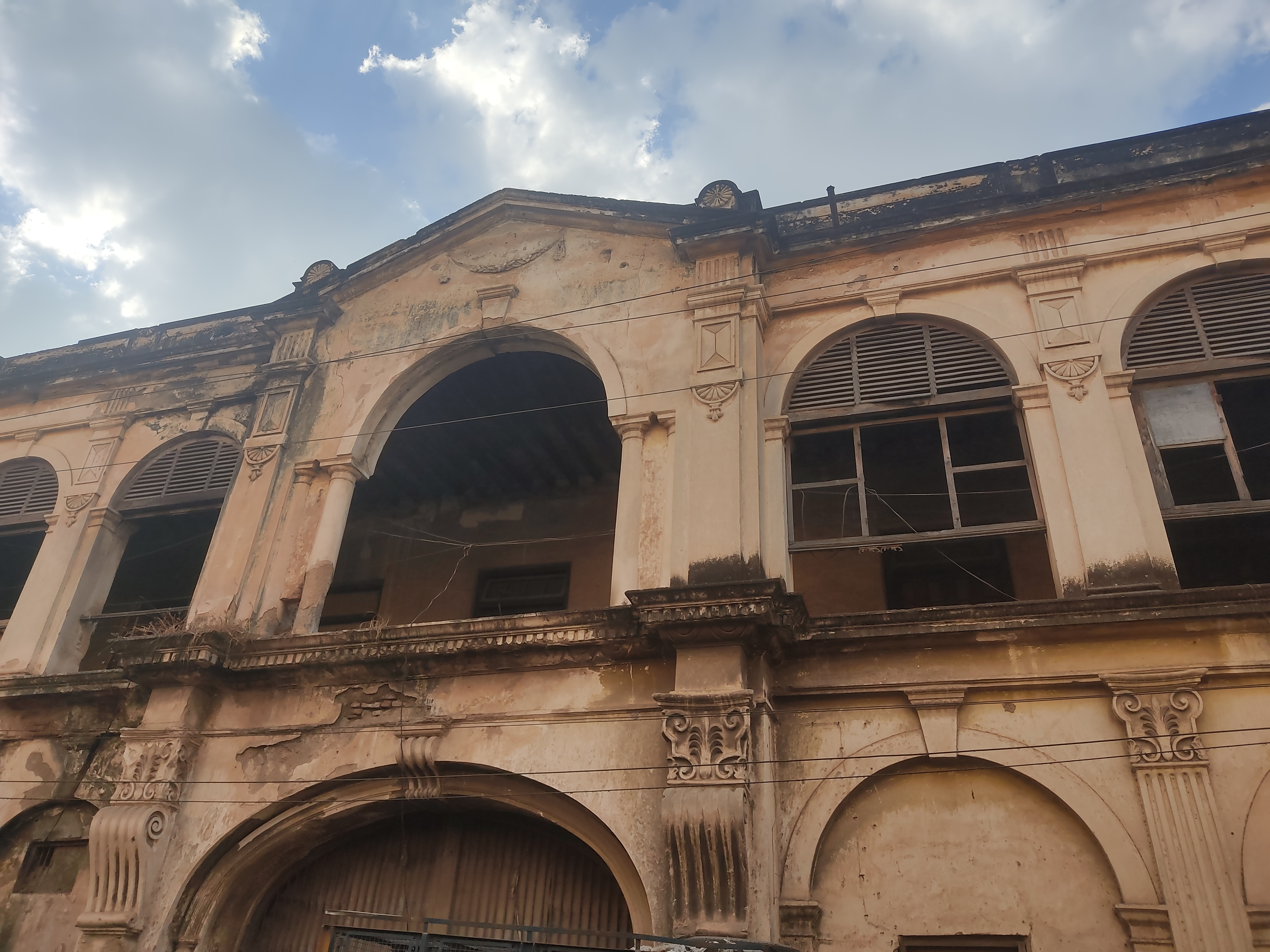
- Interactive map of the Devdi Iqbal ud-Dowla area

General information
- Location: Hyderabad

Devdi Iqbal ud-Dowla is an oriental-style mansion and heritage structure located in Hyderabad, India. It was the devdi of nobleman Sir Viqar ul Umra (also known as Iqbal ud-Dowla). It was built in the late 18th century. The historic structure is neglected by authorities and is on the verge of destruction.

== History ==
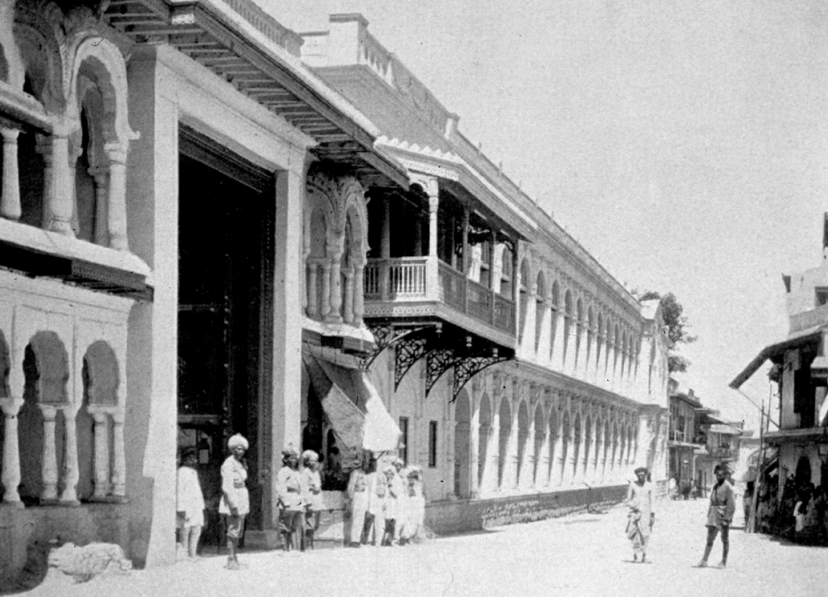

Located in Shah Ganj, it was built in the late 18th century by Shams-ul-Umra I. It was later inherited by his second son, Rashid Uddin Khan Shams-ul-Umra III, and passed on to his successor Sir Viqar-ul-Umra.

== Architecture ==
The building is an example of Palladian and Edwardian styles of architecture. The palace consisted of four quadrangles with a cistern in the middle.

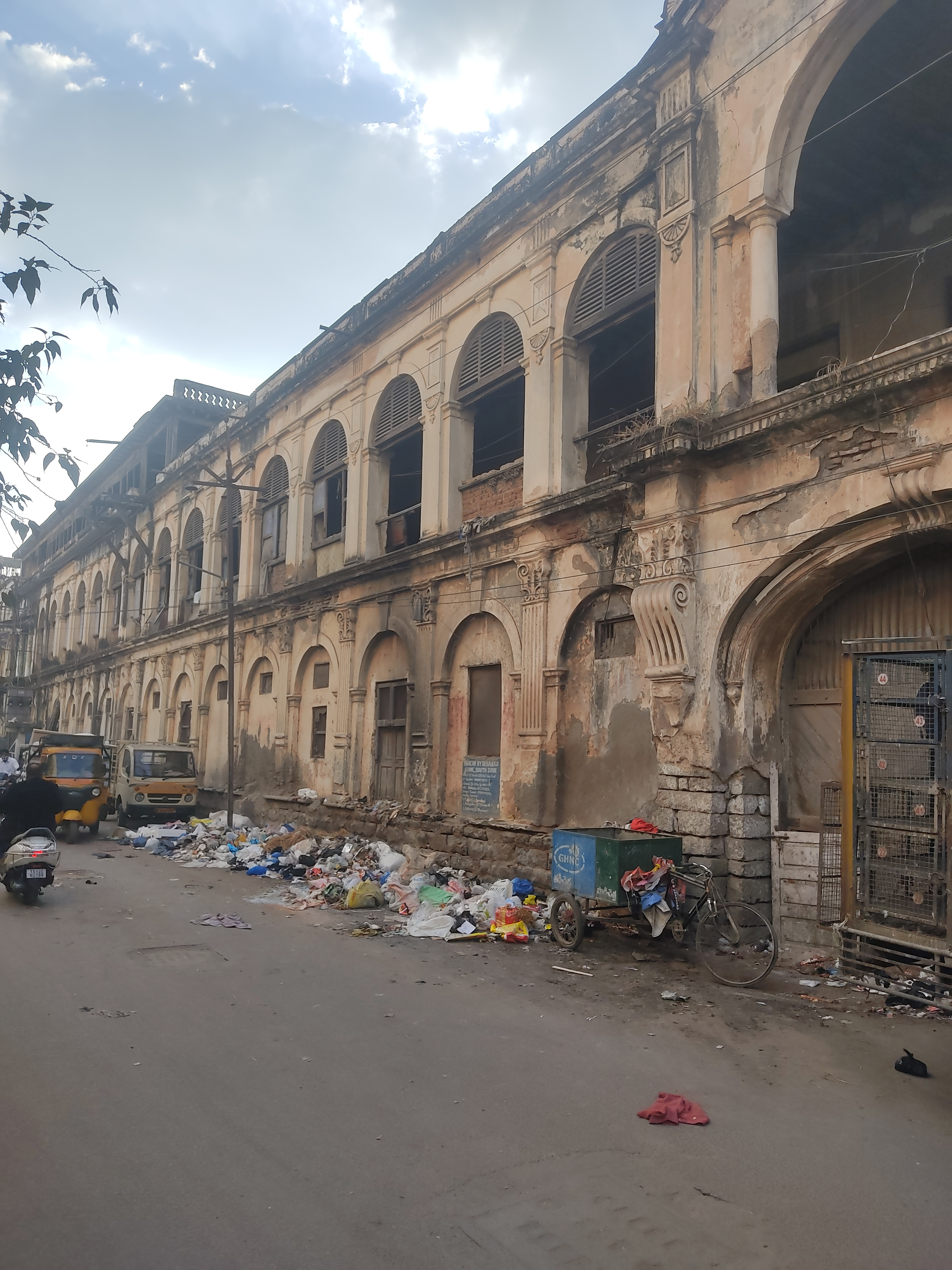
Facade of the Devdi Iqbal ud-Dowla at Shah Gunj
