= Khursheed Jah Devdi =

Palace in Hyderabad, India

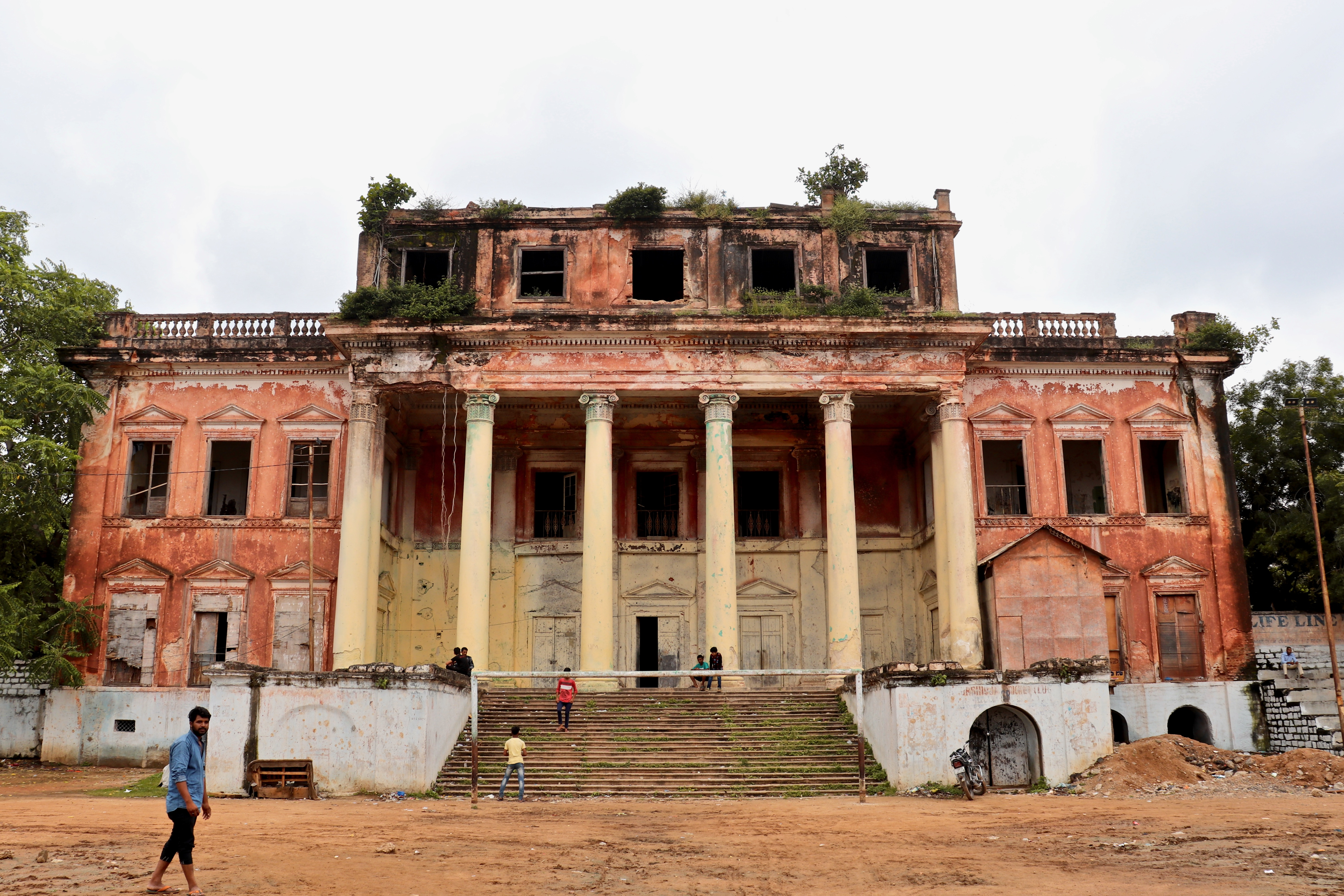
- The façade of the palace

- Location within Hyderabad Location within India
- 17.35807°N 78.46643°E
- Location: Hyderabad, Telangana, India

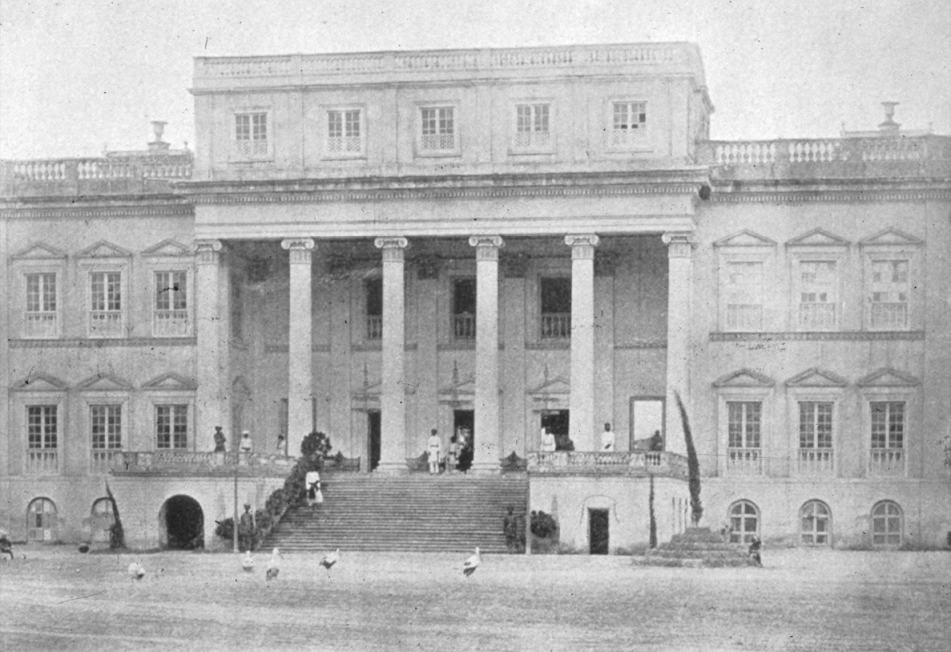
Khursheed Jah Devdi, photographed by Claude Campbell in the 1890s

Khursheed Jah Devdi is a European styled architectural palace located in Hyderabad. It was built by the Ancestors of Paigah noble Amir-Paigah Khursheed Jah Bahadur Shams-ul-Umra IV, Its interiors were once adorned with expensive carpets and exclusive chandeliers. It is located at Hussaini Alam, just a kilometre from the historic Charminar.

Despite numerous demands for restoration by heritage activists, the Khursheed Jah Devdi, once home to the Paigah nobles slowly crumbled to ruins. In 2023, authorities have allocated Rs. 12 crore to restore the property and restoration works is being taken up.

== History ==
Located in Shah Ganj, between the city palace of Asman Jah and the palace Iqbal-ud-Daula named after Khurshid Jah though it was built during the time of his grandfather Shams al-Umara II, (1781–1893). Built over a high plinth, the two-story palace has very spacious rooms and verandas. The European style façade is marked by Ionic columns and a barrel-vault roof. The palace served as a women’s college in 2008.
