= Spanish Mosque =

Mosque in Hyderabad, Telangana, India

- Masjid Iqbal Ud-Daula; Jam e Masjid "Aiwan-E-Begumpet"; Mosque of the Moors
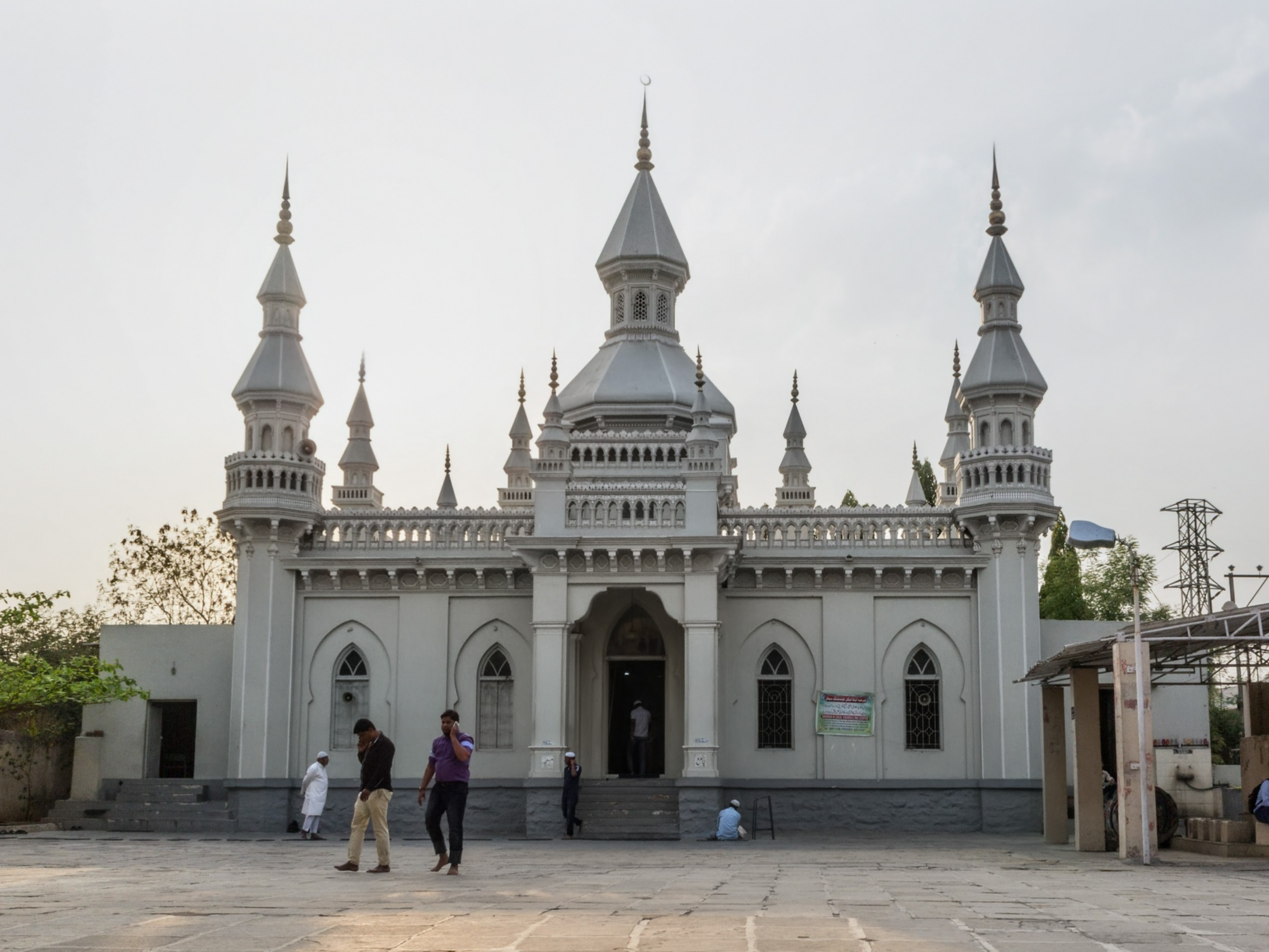
- The mosque in 2016

- Location of the mosque in Hyderabad

Religion
- Affiliation: Islam
- Ecclesiastical or organizational status: Mosque
- Status: Active

Location
- Location: Indian Airlines Colony, Begumpet, Hyderabad, Hyderabad District, Telangana
- Interactive map of Spanish Mosque
- Coordinates: 17°26′38″N 78°28′21″E

Architecture
- Type: Mosque architecture
- Style: Moorish Revival
- Founder: Sir Viqar-ul-Umra; Sultan Ul Mulk Bahadur
- Groundbreaking: 1900
- Completed: 1906

Specifications
- Capacity: 3,000 worshipers
- Spire: Eight (maybe more)

The Spanish Mosque, also known as the Masjid Iqbal Ud Daula and the Jam e Masjid "Aiwan-E-Begumpet", is a mosque within Paigah Palace, in the Begumpet neighbourhood of Hyderabad, in the Hyderabad district of the state of Telangana, India.

It is also known as the Mosque of the Moors, due to its unique Moorish Revival architectural style and is said to be one-of-its-kind in India.

== Architecture ==
The construction of the mosque was started by the fifth Paigah Amir, H.E. Nawab Mohammed Fazaluddin Khan, Iqbal Ud Daula, Sir Viqar-ul-Umra in 1900 (due to his sudden demise in 1902) and completed by his heir and elder son H.E Nawab Sultan Ul Mulk Bahadur, VI Amir of Paigah through Princess Jahandarunissa Begum, Lady Vicar Ul Umra. After his return from Spain, Viqar-ul-Umra was very much inspired by the Cathedral–Mosque of Córdoba. The exterior and interior of the Spanish Mosque are mostly similar to the Cathedral–Mosque and Jama Masjid Gulbarga, in Karnataka, India. The mosque shows state-of-the-art interiors and architecture. The stand-out feature is the spires instead of the usual minarets or domes; they give this mosque a church-like appearance.

The mosque is maintained and managed by the heirs of Paigah Amir Sir Viqar-ul-Umra.

The mosque can accommodate 3,000 worshipers at once. The Spanish Mosque is very well known and is considered as a landmark mosque for the Secunderabad Muslim community.

The Spanish Mosque is a declared heritage site by Archaeological Survey of India (ASI) and is under discussion for the consideration of UNESCO Asia Pacific Merit.

== See also ==
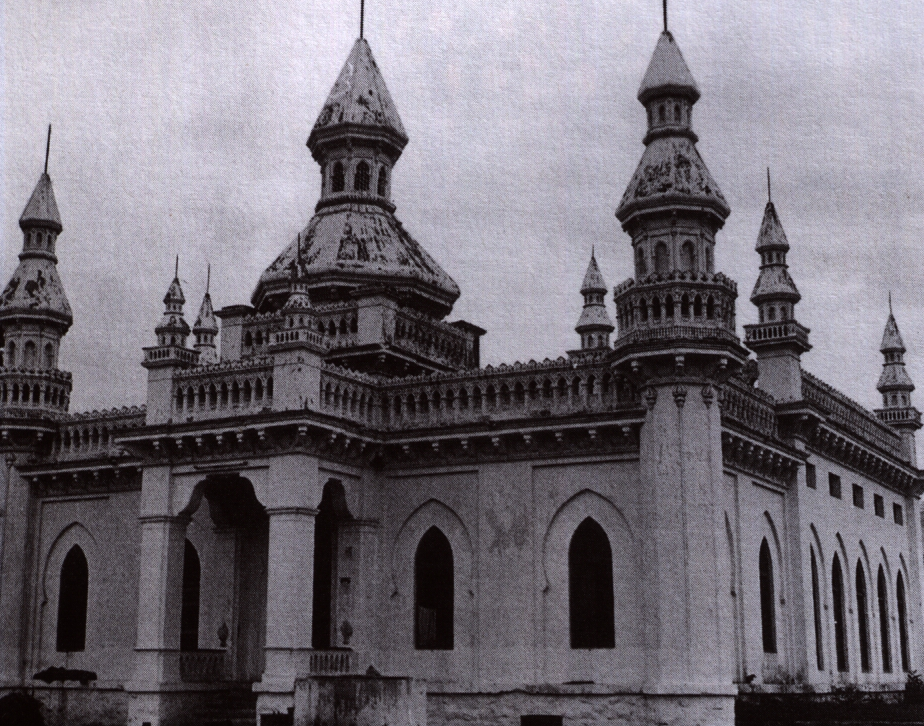
The mosque in the early 1940s

- Islam in India
- List of mosques in Telangana
- List of former mosques in Spain
- Heritage structures in Hyderabad
