= Gitanjali Senior School, Begumpet =

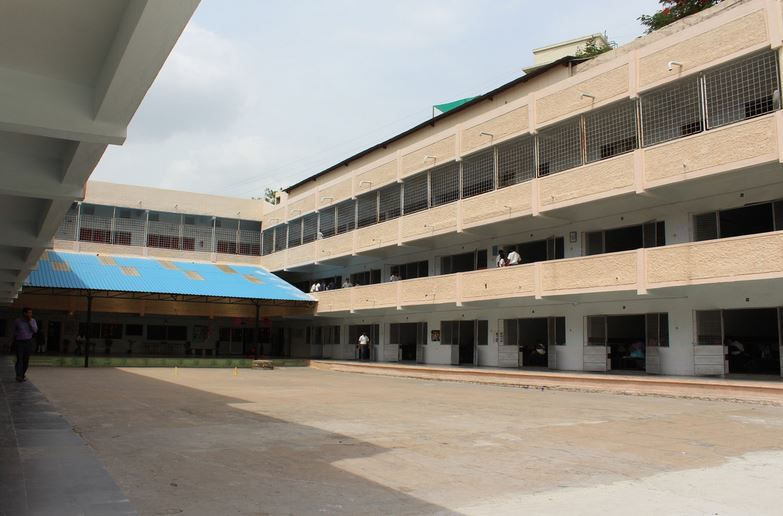

Location
- Hyderabad; India; 17°26′24.28″N 78°27′45.81″E

Information
- Type: Private
- Established: June 1990
- Founders: Mrs. Gita Karan and Mr. Uma Karan
- Principal: Mrs. T Anjana Subramanyam
- Faculty: 50+
- Enrollment: 500+
- Campus: Mayuri Marg, Begumpet
- Alumni: Gitanjalians
- Website: gitanjalischools.com gitanjaliseniorschool.org

Gitanjali Senior School was established by Mrs Gita Karan and Mr Uma Karan in June 1990 in Begumpet, Hyderabad, India. The school has a primary school in Brahman Wadi, a kilometer away. Gitanjali Senior School has secured many national ranks in surveys and was ranked the third-best school in South India and the best in Andhra Pradesh in a survey conducted by Education World Magazine.

The school has grades from classes 7 to 10 of Indian Certificate of Secondary Education and checkpoint and IGCSE. It also offers A-Level and ISC Boards for class 11 and 12.

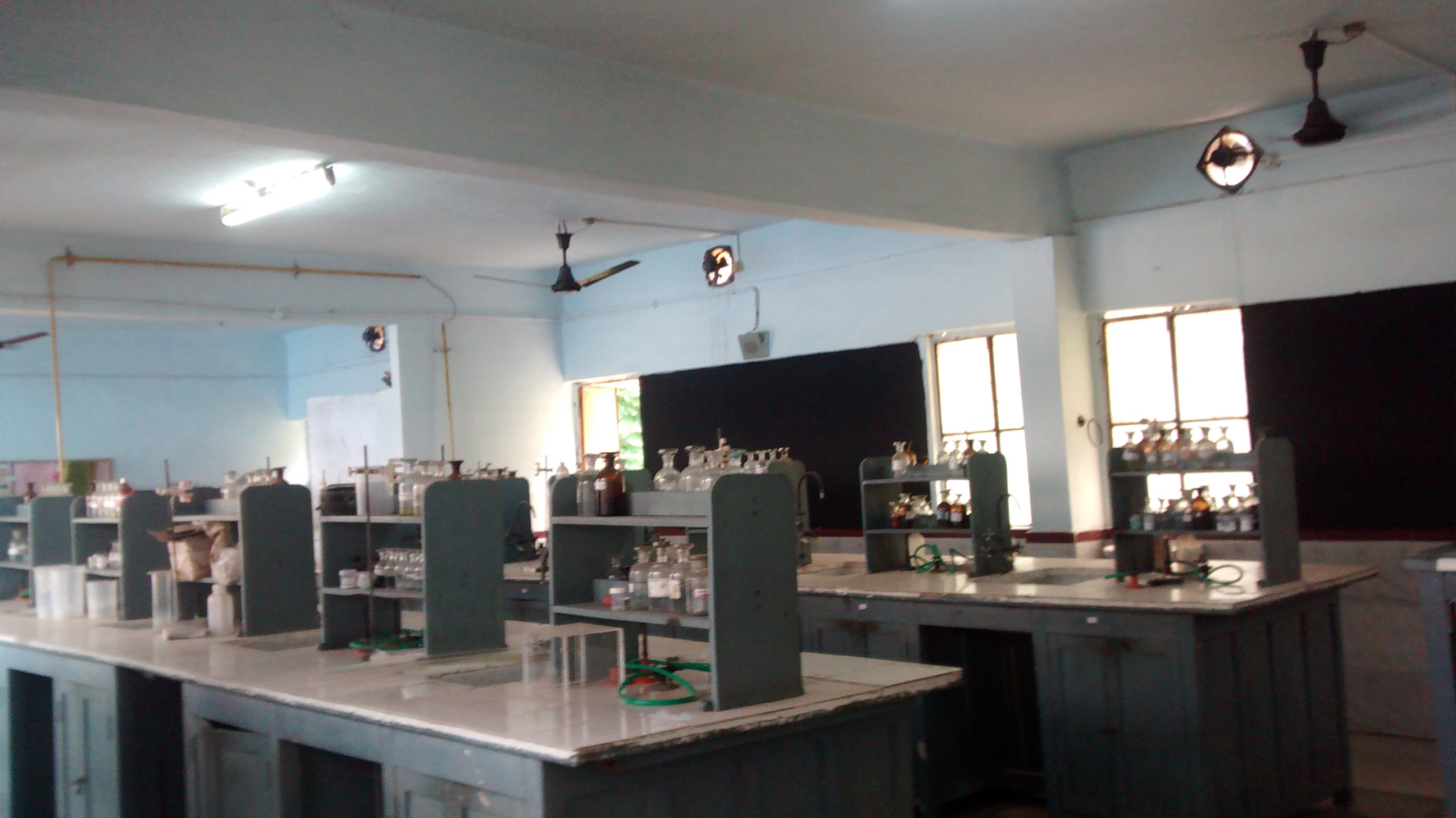
Gitanjali School Chemistry Lab

== Events ==
For the first time, the institution hosted its MUN in 2015, attended by students from twin cities. The school also hosts a Sports Day and Investiture Ceremony and an Annual Day every year. It hosts Festanjali, the annual Inter-house fest for school students with literary events such as debate, elocution, and poetry. The sports events include cricket, football, basketball, kho-kho, and athletics. These are hosted under the category of Inter-House Events. An annual volleyball tournament is also held for the teachers.

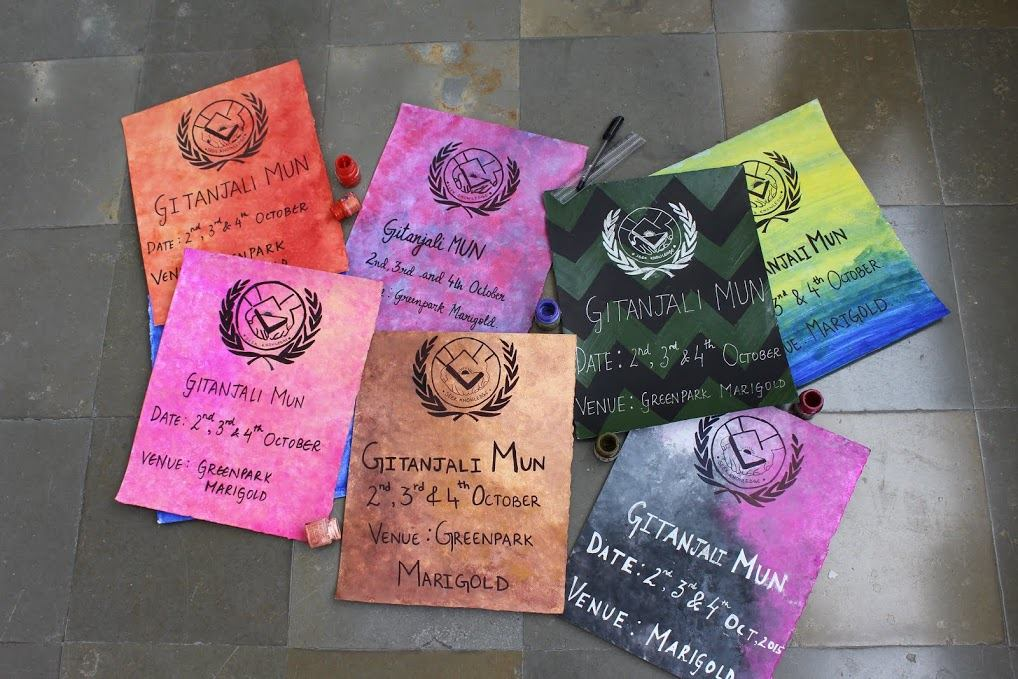
GSS MUN 2015

== Rankings ==
Since 2008, Education World has consistently ranked Gitanjali as the best school in Hyderabad and among the top 10 day-schools in the country, with a peak national ranking of 7.

In 2018, Education Today ranked Gitanjali School at 6th among Top ICSE Schools in India. Under the Academic Reputation category, Gitanjali was ranked 3rd in the country.

| Education World Survey Year | Rank – India (Day Schools) |
|---|---|
| 2008 | 7 |
| 2009 | 10 |
| 2010 | 9 |
| 2011 | 8 |
