= Hajrudin =

- Gender: Male

Other names
- Related names: Khair ad-Din

Hajrudin is a Bosnian masculine given name. Notable people with the name include:

- Hajrudin Ćatić (born 1975), Bosnian footballer
- Hajrudin Đurbuzović (born 1956), Bosnian football manager and former player
- Hajrudin Krvavac (born 1929 - died 1992), Bosnian film director
- Hajrudin Saračević (1949–2022), Bosnian football player
- Hajrudin Somun (born 1937), Bosnian journalist and diplomat
- Hajrudin Varešanović (born 1961), Bosnian rock vocalist
- Hajrudin (One Piece), fictional character
