= Haradinaj =

Haradinaj is an Albanian surname, derived from Arabic Khair ad-Din (خير الدين) meaning "the goodness of the Faith". It may refer to:

- Daut Haradinaj (born 1978), Kosovar Albanian politician
- Luan Haradinaj (1973–1997), Kosovo Liberation Army soldier
- Meliza Haradinaj-Stublla, Kosovan politician
- Nasim Haradinaj (born 1963), Kosovar politician and former KLA veteran
- Ramush Haradinaj (born 1968), Kosovar politician
- Shkëlzen Haradinaj (1970–1999), Kosovo Liberation Army soldier and commander

== See also ==
- Hajradinović, Bosnian variant
