= Khair ad-Din =

Khair ad-Din (Arabic: خير الدين), Arabic name meaning "the goodness of the faith", may refer to:

- Hayreddin Pasha (1330–1387), Ottoman grand vizier
- Jam Khairuddin also known as Jam Tamachi (1367–1379), Sultan of Samma Dynasty
- Hayreddin Barbarossa (1478–1546), Barbary corsair and Ottoman admiral
- Khayr al-Din al-Ramli, (1585–1671) 17th-century Islamic jurist, teacher and writer
- Hayreddin Pasha (c. 1822–1890), Tunisian political reformer and Ottoman Grand Vizier (sometimes known as "Khair al-Din" or "Khaireddin")
- Kheireddine Abdul Wahab (1878–1944), Lebanese businessman and politician
- Khayreddin al-Ahdab (1894–1941), Lebanese politician
- Muhammad Khair ud-din Mirza, Khurshid Jah Bahadur (1914–1975), titular Emperor of the Mughal Empire
- Khairuddin Mohamed Yusof (born 1939), medical professor at the University of Malaya
- Khairuddin Abdul Hamid (born 1966), Bruneian politician
- Mohammed Khaïr-Eddine (born 1941), Moroccan writer
- Hajrudin Varešanović, known as Hari Varešanović (born 1961), Bosnian singer
- Kheireddine Kherris (born 1973), Algerian footballer
- Kheireddine Zarabi (born 1984), Algerian footballer
- Tasha Kheiriddin, (born 1970), Canadian political commentator

== See also ==
- Hayredin, village in Bulgaria
- Hayrettin (disambiguation)
- Kheïr Eddine District, Algeria
- Haradinaj, Albanian surname
- Hajradinović, Bosnian surname
