= Hajradinović =

Hajradinović is a Bosnian surname, derived from Arabic Khair ad-Din (خير الدين) meaning "the goodness of the Faith". It may refer to:

- Haris Hajradinović, footballer
- Elvis Hajradinović, footballer

== See also ==
- Haradinaj, Albanian variant
