= Vikhar Manzil =

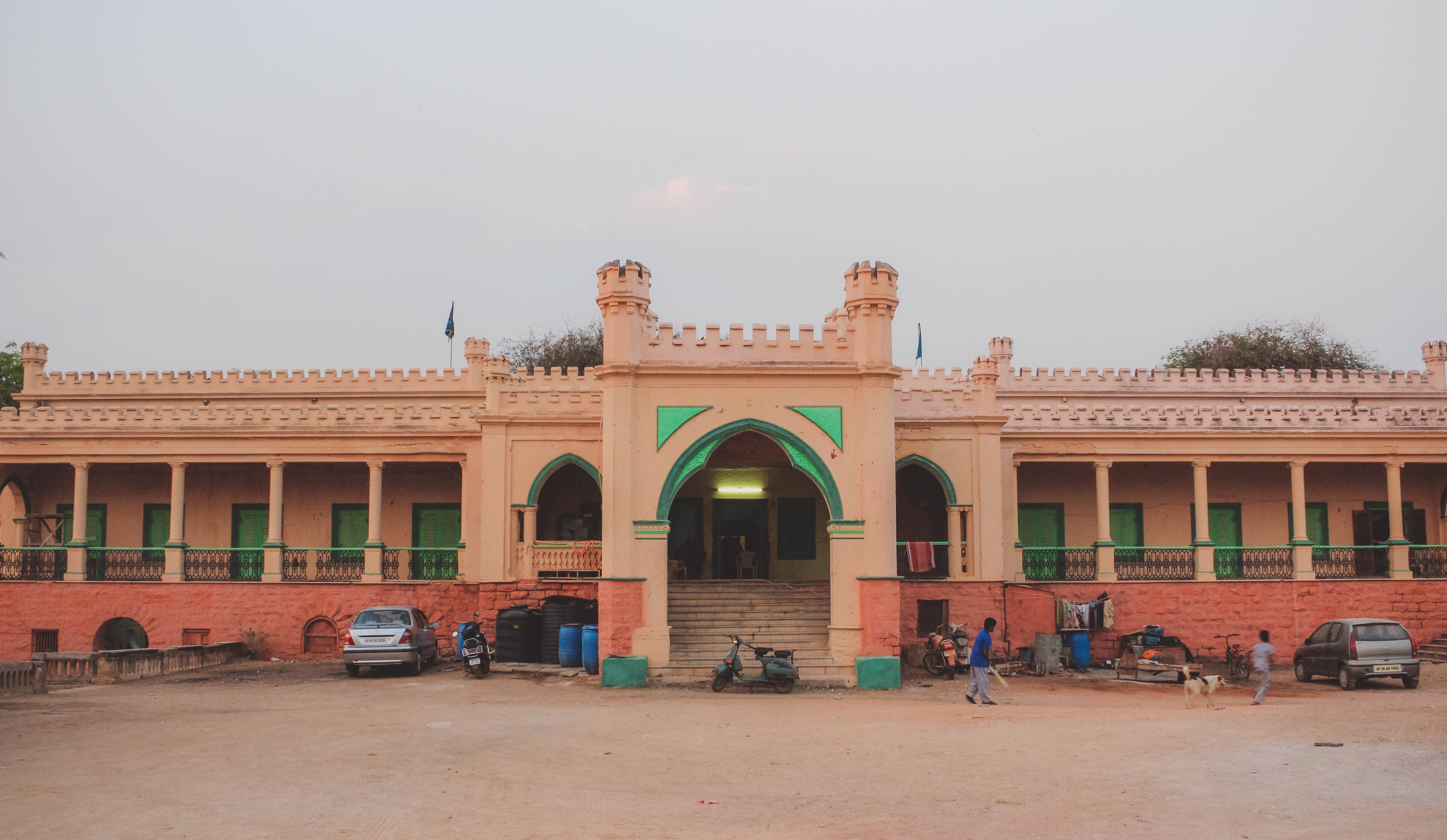
- Interactive map of the Vikhar Manzil area

General information
- Type: Palace
- Location: Hyderabad, Telangana, India

Vikhar Manzil was a mansion of Viqar-ul-Umra of the House of Paigah, a Prime Minister of Hyderabad State who bought it around 1900.
