= Paigah, Punjab =

Paigah
- Union council and town
- Location in Pakistan
- Coordinates: 29°58′N 70°39′E
- Country: Pakistan
- Province: Punjab
- District: Dera Ghazi Khan District
- Elevation: 377 ft (115 m)
- Time zone: UTC+5 (PST)
  - Summer (DST): +6

Paigah is a town and union council of Dera Ghazi Khan District in the Punjab province of Pakistan. It is located at 29°58'0N 70°39'0E and has an altitude of 115 metres (380 feet).
