= Begumpet =

Locality in Hyderabad, India

- Inner City
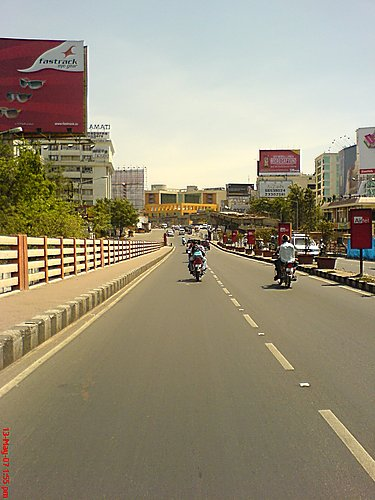
- Begumpet flyover, one of the oldest flyovers in the city

- Location in Hyderabad, India Begumpet (India)
- Coordinates: 17.444865°N 78.469396°E
- Country: India
- State: Telangana
- District: Hyderabad
- Metro: Hyderabad

Government
  - Body: GHMC

Languages
  - Official: Telugu, Urdu
- Time zone: UTC+5:30 (IST)
- PIN: 500 016
- Vehicle registration: TG
- Parliament constituencies: Secunderabad
- Sasana Sabha constituencies: Khairtabad
- Planning agency: GHMC
- Website: telangana.gov.in

Begumpet is a locality of Hyderabad, Telangana, India. Begumpet is named after the daughter of the sixth Nizam (Mahbub Ali Khan, Asaf Jah VI), Basheer Unnisa Begum, who received it as part of her wedding dowry when she was married to the second Amir of Paigah Shams ul Umra Amir e Kabir.

== About ==
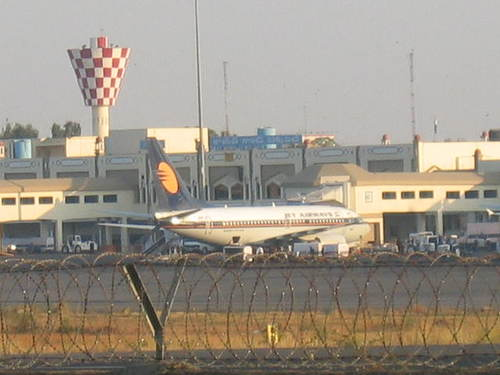
Partial view of the old Begumpet Airport

Begumpet is one of the major commercial and residential suburbs in Hyderabad located to the north of Hussain Sagar lake. The Greenlands flyover connects Begumpet to Panjagutta. Begumpet was initially a small suburb between Hyderabad and Secunderabad. The CM Camp office located in the center of the Begumpet, is another major landmark for the location. Begumpet was the most impacted in 2000 Hyderabad floods after a deluge of 241.5 mm was recorded on 24 August 2000.

Begumpet Airport is a major landmark of the city. The airport is closed for commercial flights after the inauguration of the new international airport at Shamshabad and is operational only for training and chartered flights.

Paigah Palace, Gitanjali Senior School, Begumpet, Taj Vivanta, Spanish Mosque, Hyderabad Public School and Sir Ronald Ross Institute are some important places located in the area. Sanjeevaiah Park is a public park located on the banks of Hussain Sagar. The Greenlands area of the town was home to Raja Jitendra Public School until 1997.

== Hospitals ==
- Pace Hospitals
- Maxivision Eye Hospitals

== Education ==
- The Hyderabad Public School, Begumpet
- Maharishi Veda Vigyan Mahavidyalaya
- Manson Center of Excellence School of Business Management
- Saint Joans High School
- Vijay Marie College of Nursing
- St. Francis College For Women
- Global Tree Overseas Education & Immigration Consultants
- NIIT University

== Transport ==
Being centrally located in the city, one cannot avoid passing over Begumpet. The Begumpet Flyover connect one side of the city to the other. Begumpet is also home to the Begumpet Railway Station, which is where trains starting from Lingampally split and head either towards Falaknuma or Hyderabad. Right above the Begumpet Railway Station is the Begumpet metro station, a part of the latest addition to Hyderabad's public transport infrastructure - the Hyderabad Metro.Within walking distance from the Begumpet Railway Station are the Lal Bungalow Bus Stop and the Greenlands Bus Stop from where one can avail buses to all major hubs of Hyderabad.
