= Devdi =

Devdi or Deodi is a noble mansion where the Nawabs of Hyderabad lived. Dozens of them, with grand halls and serene courtyards, held the secrets of a distinct nobility.

The word devdi used to originally mean a hut, but the nobility started referring to their mansions as devdis in a deprecating way. Thus it came to be the word for the mansions of the nobles.

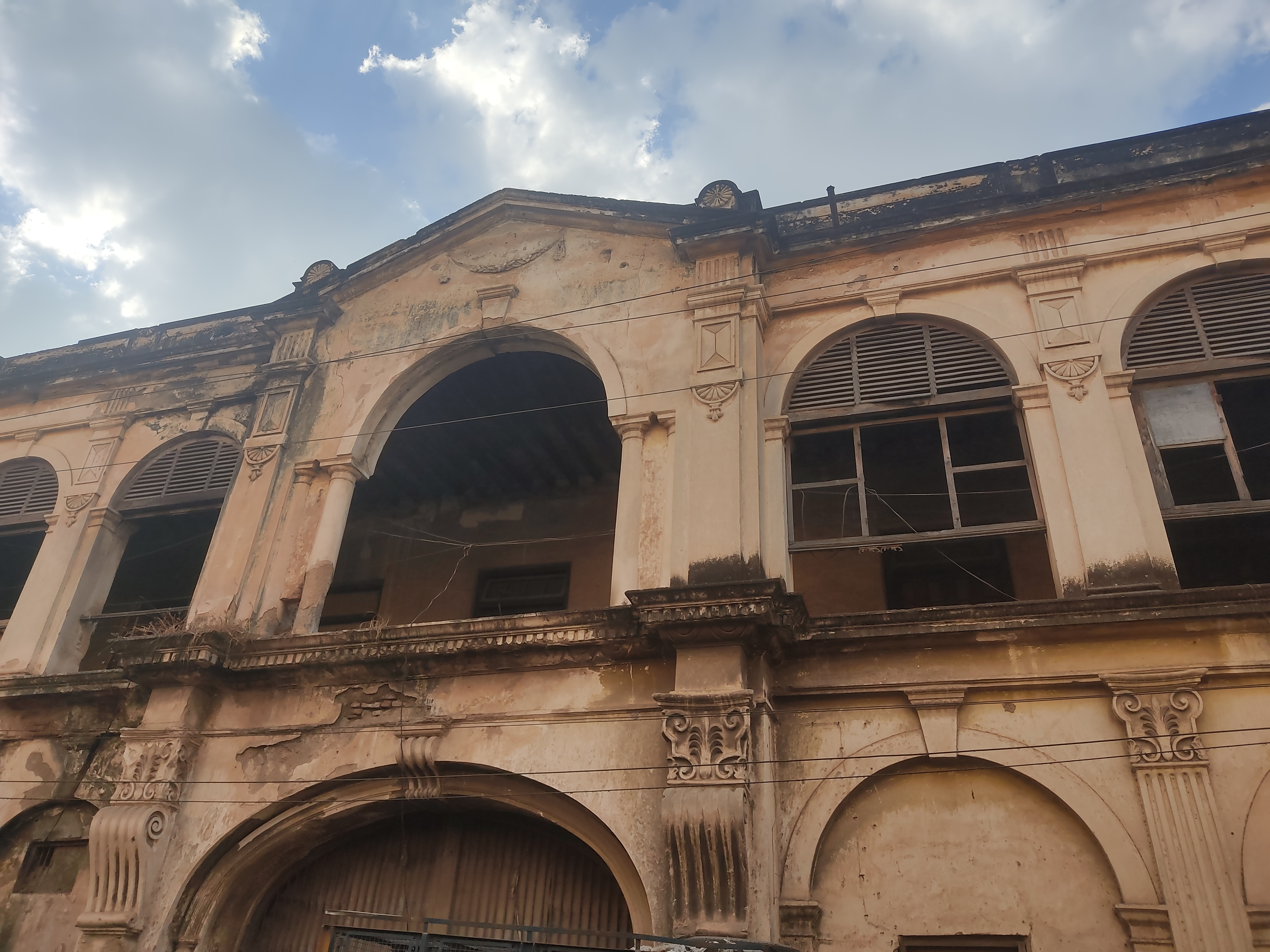
Devdi Iqbal ud-Dowla

Today, only a few are left standing, in various states of decay. Some important devdis are:

- Khurshid Jah Devdi
- Dewan Devdi
- Devdi Iqbal ud Dowla
- Fareed nawaz Jung devdi
