= Viqar-ul-Umra =

Prime Minister of Hyderabad

H.E. Nawab Sir Viqar-ul-Umara, Iqtidar ul-Mulk, Iqbal ud-Daula, Muhammad Fazl-ud-Din Khan Bahadur, KCIE, Kaiser-i-Hind, Secundar Jung
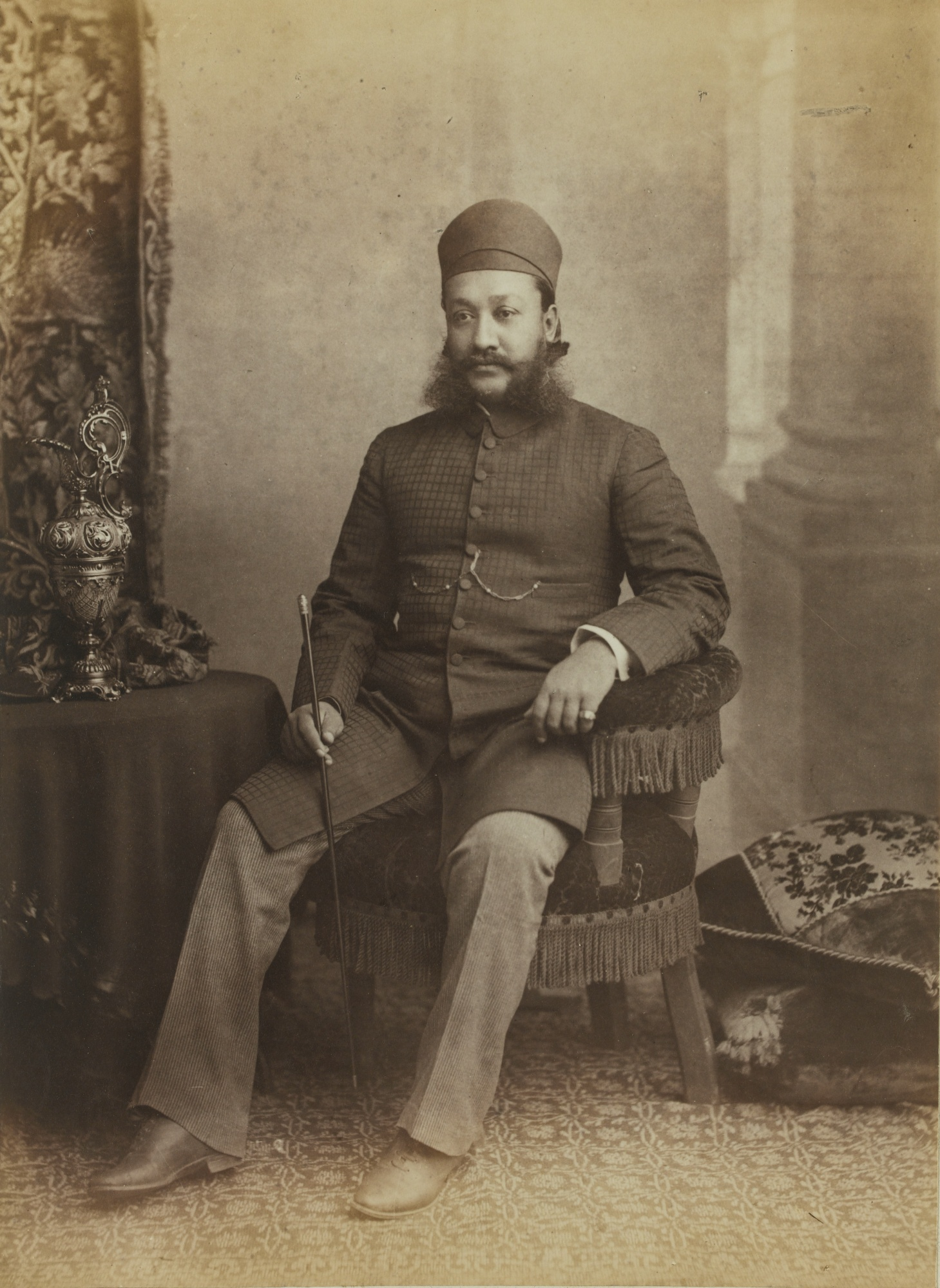
- Born: 13 August 1856; Hyderabad, Hyderabad State, India
- Died: 15 February 1902 (age 45); Yalghadap-Khanapur, Hyderabad-Deccan, Hyderabad State, India
- Burial place: Paigah Tombs, Hyderabad
- Spouse(s): Princess Jahandar un-Nisa of Hyderabad; Muneer Un-nisa Begum, Dr. Gul Bai Vicajee
- Children: Prince Sultan ul-Mulk Bahadur, Prince Wali ud-Dowla, Princess Liyaqat un-nisa Begum, Princess Tabarak un-Nisa Begum
- Parents: Amir e Kabir III Nawab Raheeduddin Khan Bahadur, Shams-ul-Umara IV (father); Princess Hashmath un-nisa Begum Saheba (daughter of Nawab Sikandar Jah Bahadur, Nizam III of Hyderabad) (mother)
- Relatives: Asman Jah (cousin); Asaf Jah VI (brother-in-law); Asaf Jah V (father-in-law)
- Family: Paigah family

Prime Minister of Hyderabad
- In office 1893–1901
- Monarch: Asaf Jah VI
- Preceded by: Nawab Asman Jah
- Succeeded by: Maharaja Sir Kishen Pershad

Amir-e-Paigah
- In office 1881–1902
- Preceded by: Nawab Raheeduddin Khan Bahadur
- Succeeded by: Nawab Sultan ul Mulk Bahadur

Sir Viqar ul-Umara, Iqtidar ul-Mulk, Iqbal ud-Dowla, Secundar Jung, Nawab Muhammad Fazl-ud-din Khan Bahadur (13 August 1856 – 15 February 1902), was the Prime Minister of Hyderabad State from 1893 to 1901, and also the Amir-e-Paigah from 1881 to 1902.

The town of Vikarabad is named after him.

== Early life and ancestry ==
Viqar-ul-Umra was born as Muhammad Fazluddin Khan on 13 August 1856 to Rashiduddin Khan and Hashmatunnisa Begum. Viqar-ul-Umra's maternal grandmother was Bashirunnisa Begum, a daughter of Nizam Ali Khan, Nizam of Hyderabad and Berar.

Viqar-ul-Umra was a member of the Paigah family. The family was hierarchically second to the Nizam of Hyderabad. The family members were staunch loyalists of the Nizam. The family descends from the Rashidun caliph Umar. One of the family's ancestor is the Sufi saint Fariduddin Ganjshakar. Another ancestor Muhammad Abu’l Khair Khan was a mansabdar during Mughal emperor Aurangzeb's reign.

== Tenure as prime minister ==
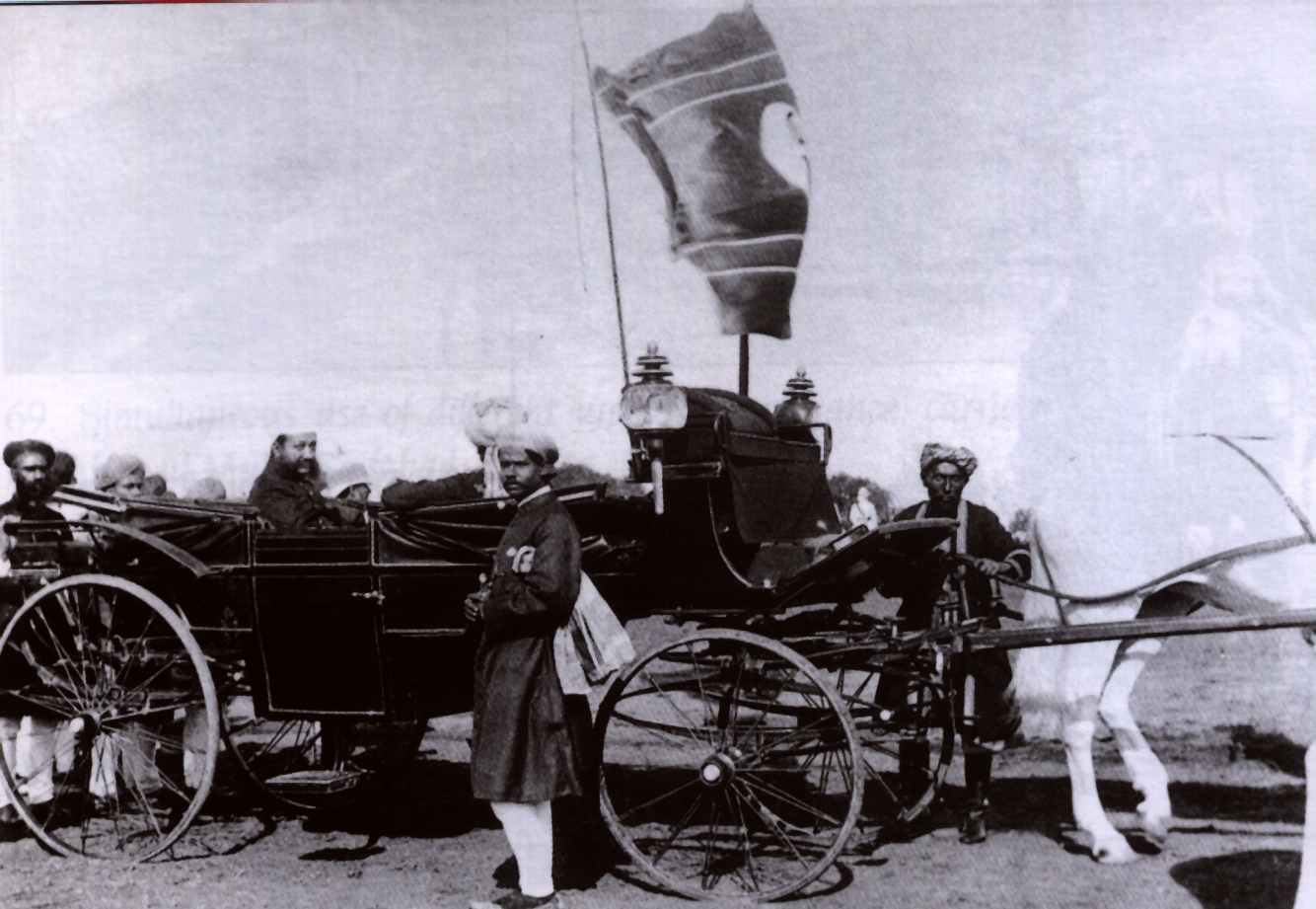
Viqar ul-Umara in buggy (c. 1900)

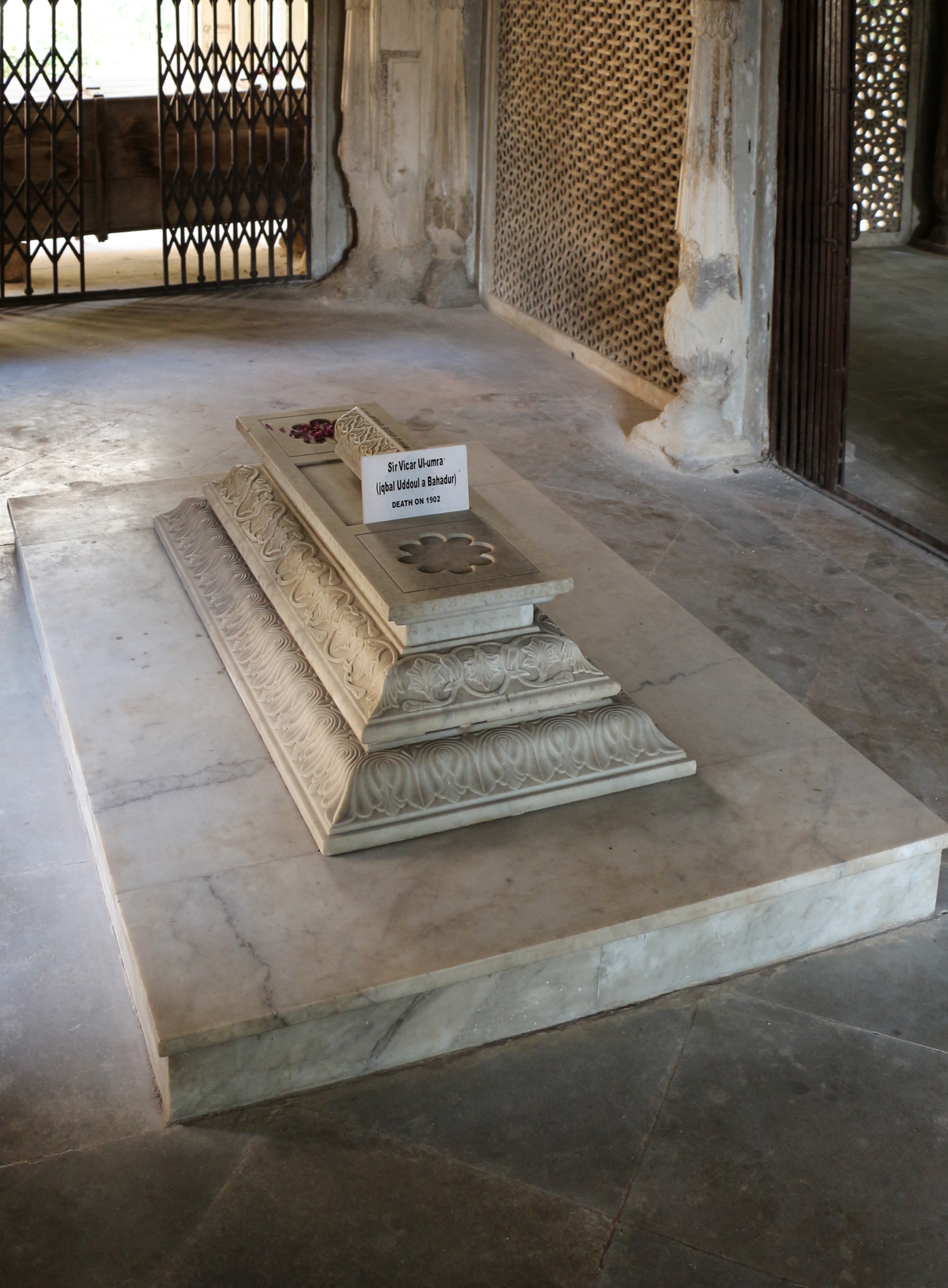
His tomb in Hyderabad

He was the fifth Amir of a noble family, the Paigahs, and was the maternal grandson of Asaf Jah III.

== Architecture ==
Viqar-ul-Umra commissioned the Spanish Mosque (original name: Jama Masjid Aiwan-e-Begumpet) at Begumpet, Hyderabad in 1887. He started its construction after getting inspired by Spanish architecture during one of his trips to Spain. It is built in the Moorish architecture style and has calligraphy, horseshoe arches and influences of Roman architecture.

Viqar-ul-Umra constructed the Falaknuma Palace in 1893. Later on this palace was allegedly gifted to the Nizam Mahbub Ali Khan under political pressure. This palace was built with a blend of Italian and Tudor architecture and the ceiling is adorned with frescos. It also has the world's largest dining wall in which chairs made of rosewood are present. Currently, it is a hotel, leased to Taj Hotels. Notable dignitaries to stay in this palace include Czar Nicholas II, George V, Queen Mary, Narendra Modi and Ivanka Trump.

After Nizam bought the Falaknuma Palace, Viqar-ul-Umra built the Paigah Palace (originally known as Aiwan-e-Viqar) for himself. The Zenana Mahal in it was built with a blend of Neo Gothic, Indo-Saracenic and Mughal architecture. A part of the palace houses the U.S. consulate and a part of it is inhabited by his descendants. By c. 1900, he built scores of monuments, public buildings, Dams, water reservoirs, artificial lakes, and about 21 palaces and mansions in the state of Hyderabad including the palace of Paigah Palace also known as Aiwan-e-Begumpet.

Viqar-ul-Umra founded the city of Vikarabad in what became Telangana state, India.

== Personal life ==
In c. 1873, Viqar-ul-Umra married Jahanderunnisa Begum. She was the fourth daughter of Nizam Afzal ad-Dawlah, Asaf Jah V Tahniyath Ali Khan and a sister of Nizam Mahboob Ali Khan. After Nawab Viqar-ul-Umra Bahadur was knighted, his wife took the title Lady Viqar-ul-Umra. Their son Sultan-ul-Mulk was born on 3 November 1875. He later became the Amir-i-Paigah-Viqar-ul-Umra (Amir-i-Paigah of Viqar-ul-Umra branch). They also had a daughter – Liaqatunnisa Begum.

In 1878, Viqar-ul-Umra married Munirunnisa Begum, the daughter of Nawab Hamza Ali Khan Bahadur. Their son Waliuddin Khan was born on 13 March 1880. He later served as the Prime Minister of Hyderabad. They also had a daughter – Taharaqunnisa Begum.

Although Viqar-ul-Umra's previous marriages were arranged, he fell in love with Dr. Gulbai Viccajee, a Hyderabadi physician. They first met in Mumbai. In 1900, they married. As she was a Zoroastrian by faith (colloquially known as Parsi), she converted to Islam to marry him. She took the name Nur Jahan Begum. After marriage, she left her medical profession and lived in purdah at Vikhar Manzil.

Viqar-ul-Umra died while hunting at Yalghadap - Khanapur (in present-day Nizamabad district in Telangana) on 15 February 1902. He is buried at the Paigah Tombs.

=== Polo ===
Viqar-ul-Umra was an avid player of polo. He discovered the sport during a tour to Europe and later brought it to Hyderabad. He went on to popularise the sport amongst the nobles of the state. He also constructed polo grounds in the state and organized polo tournaments for the royal families.

Government offices
Preceded by Nawab Asman Jah Bahadur	Prime Minister of Hyderabad; 1893–1901	Succeeded by Maharaja Sir Kishen Pershad
