= Mirza Khurshid Jah Bahadur =

Mughal prince (1914–1975)

- Mughal Prince; Chief Representative of the Royal House of Delhi
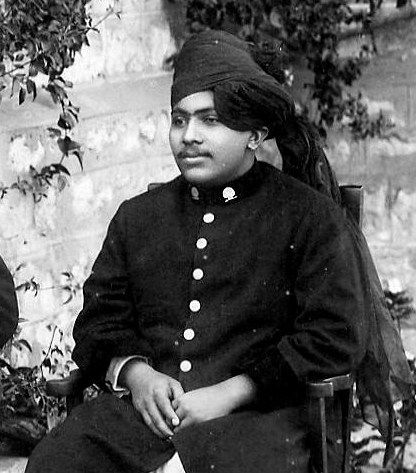
- Bahadur in 1931

Head of the Timurid Dynasty
- Reign: 1931 – 3 August 1975
- Predecessor: Mirza Salim
- Successor: Mirza Ghulam Moinuddin Muhammad Javaid Jah Bahadur
- Born: 15 October 1914; Delhi British Raj
- Died: 3 August 1975 (aged 60); Lahore Pakistan
- Issue: Mirza Ghulam Muinuddin; Mirza Akbar; Sabahat Jahan Begum; Zakawat Jahan Begum; Fasahat Jahan Begum; Nabahat Jahan Begum; Musarat Begum
Names
- Mirza Muhammad Khair ud-din, Khurshid Jah Bahadur ibn Mirza Muhammad Fayazuddin Bahadur ibn Mirza Kabiruddin Muhammad Bahadur ibn 'Abdu'llah Jalal ud-din Abu'l Muzaffar Ham ud-din Muhammad 'Mirza Ali Gauhar Shah-i-'Alam II
- House: Mughal Dynasty
- Dynasty: House of Timur
- Father: Mirza Fayazuddin
- Mother: Darakshanda uz-Zamani
- Religion: Sunni Islam (Hanafi)

Mirza Muhammad Khair ud-din, Khurshid Jah Bahadur (15 October 1914 – 3 August 1975) was born in Red Fort, Delhi, as the only son of Mirza Muhammad Fayazuddin Bahadur. By lineage, he was the Great-Grandson of Shah Alam II, and was recognised as the last head of the Timurid dynasty and Crown Prince of the Mughal Empire by the Government of India in 1931. He emigrated to Lahore, Pakistan, following the partition of India in 1947.

== Biography ==
He was educated at Mayo College.
