= D. Raja Reddy =

Indian Neurosurgeon (born 1938)

D. Raja Reddy is an Indian Neurosurgeon, born on 18 November 1938 at Jangampally Village of Nizamabad district., Andhra Pradesh. He graduated from Gandhi Medical College, Hyderabad and went on to become a fellow of Royal College of Surgeons (F.R.C.S.,) and fellow of Royal Australian College of Surgeons (F.R.A.C.S.). He served as a Director of Nizam Instite Medical Sciences (NIMS), and is presently a senior consultant at Apollo Hospitals, Hyderabad. In 2010 he co-authored the book Endemic skeletal fluorosis which examines the problem of endemic fluorosis in India.

He is also a numismologist and authority on Deccan coins. He has written 9 books on ancient coins and more than 25 articles on Numismatics. He is one of the founding members of Deccan Archaeological and Cultural Research Institute (DACRI) He is also a recipient of the Lifetime Achievement Award of Madras Neuro Trust.
