= Chiraan Fort Palace =

Historic building in Begumpet, Hyderabad, India

- Aiwan-i Begumpet
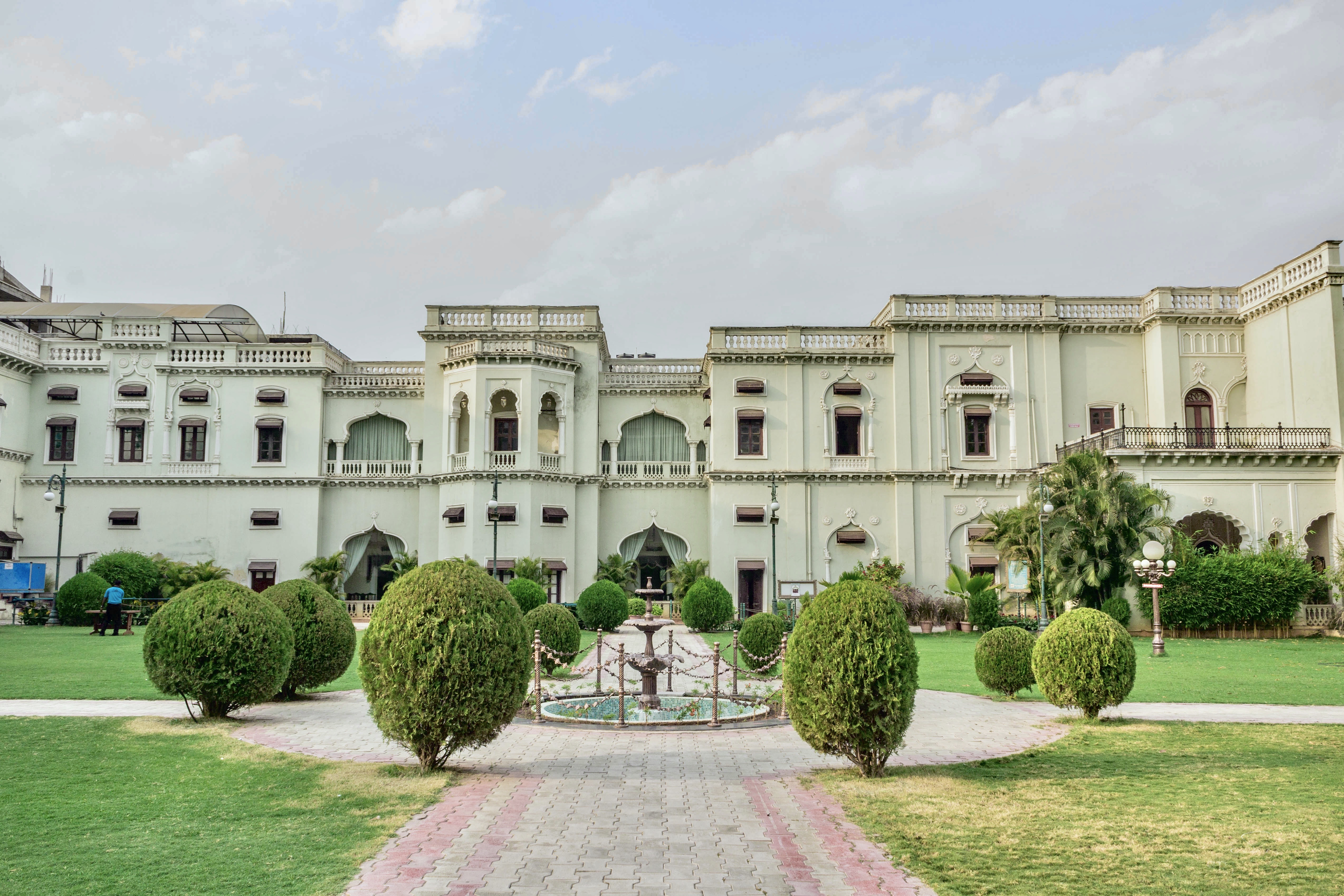
- Interactive map of the Chiraan Fort Palace area
- Former names: Devdi Fareed Nawaz Jung
- Alternative names: Devdi Nazir Nawaz Jung

General information
- Location: Begumpet, Hyderabad, Telangana, India, Begumpet
- Coordinates: 17°26′22″N 78°28′30″E
- Current tenants: Chiran Fort Club
- Completed: 1880

Design and construction
- Architect: Mughal architecture

Aiwan-i Begumpet, also known as Chiraan Fort Palace (Chiran Fort Club), and Devdi Fareed Nawaz Jung, or Devdi Nazir Nawaz Jung, was built in 1880 by Sir Viqar-ul-Umra, Amir of the Great Paigah Dynasty of Deccan, who served as Prime Minister of Hyderabad. The palace was built after the construction of Falaknuma Palace gifted to the sixth Nizam of Hyderabad Mir Mahbub Ali Khan, Asaf Jah VI. Devdi is one of the complexes in the Paigah Palace residence house of the Paigah Nobility. In the hierarchy of nobles of Hyderabad, the Paigah family ranked immediately next to the ruling family of Nizams.

== History ==
In the hierarchy of nobles of Hyderabad, the Paigah family ranked immediately next to the ruling family of Nizams.

The Paigahs were also the foremost palace builders of Hyderabad. The Falaknuma Palace was built by Nawab Viqar ul-Umra and was later acquired by the Nizam VI. Near the Chiraan Fort Palace lies the Deoris of Paigah Palace Nawab Muzaffar Nawaz Jung, Nawab Nazir Nawaz Jung, Nawab Khair Nawaz Jung, and Nawab Hassan Yar Jung, who were grandsons of Sir Viqar-ul-Umra. Chiraan fort was used as a residence for Sir Nawab Fareed Nawaz Jung and his family. The palace was passed down through three generations as residence until Sahebzade Hyder Nawab (grandson of Fareed nawaz Jung and paternal grandson of (Moin-Ud-Daula Bahadur) converted the palace into a club/restaurant and gave it on lease to senior MLA Prem Sagar Rao to Maintain the place and run it The palace is Grade II Heritage with several awards, a nearly 200 years old building.

Viqar Unnisa Begum being interviewed by local news channel

In 2026 April the palace was being illegally demolished by the lease holder Prem Sagar Rao, several damages were reported to the property and the paigah family members daughter of Hyder Nawab Viqar unnisa begum and his grand son Hasan Paigah (Hasan Sarfaraz) sued the lease holder for the property damages and took the palace back, and now the palace is with Hyder Nawab,s daughter Viqar Unnisa Begum as her private property

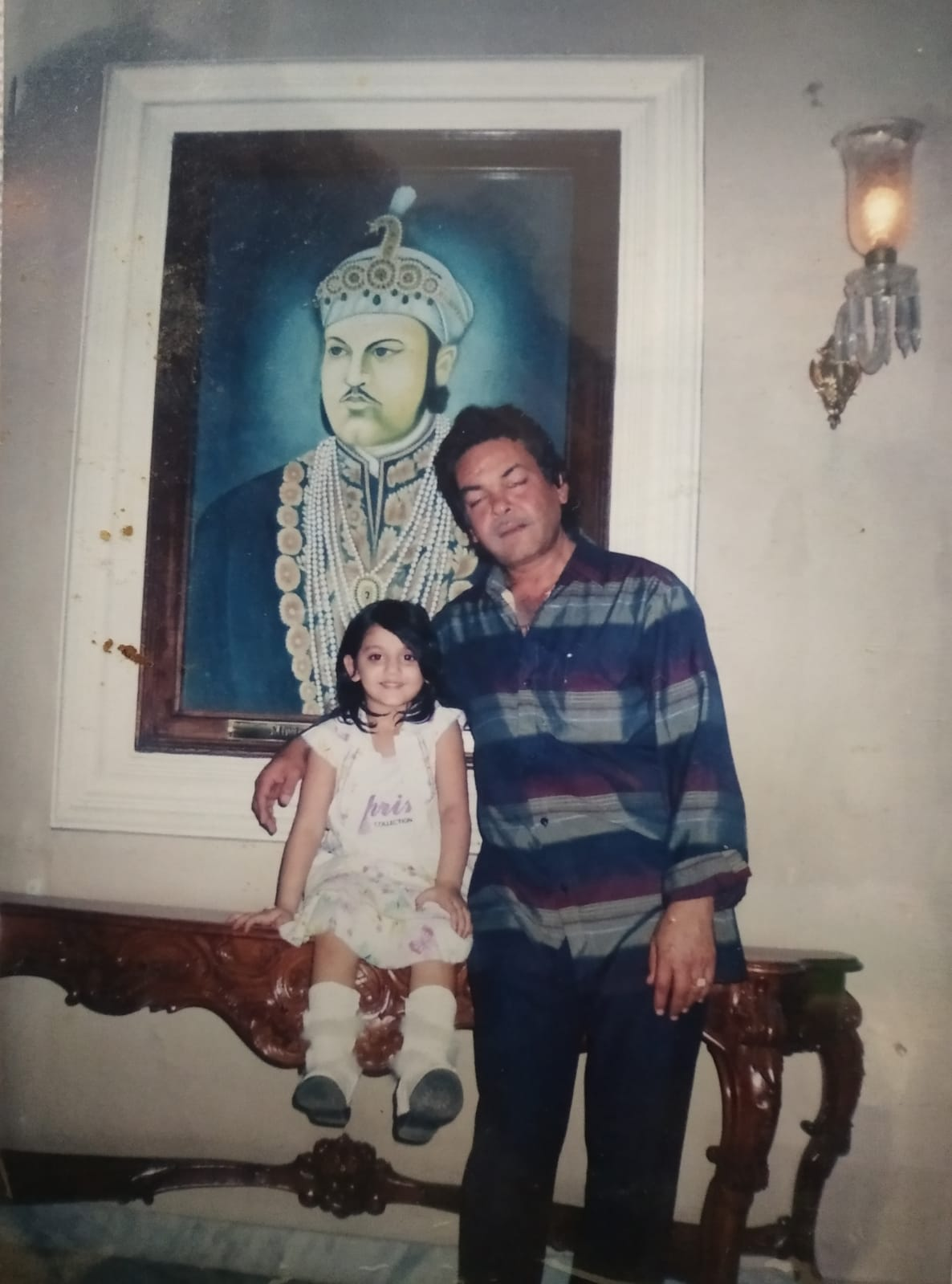
Grandson of Fareed Nawaz Jung Hyder Nawab paigah with his granddaughter

== See also ==
- Architecture of Hyderabad
