= Dasari Prasada Rao =

Indian Cardiothoracic surgeon

- Born: 21 January 1950 (age 76); Koppole, Madras Province, India
- Occupation: Cardio Thoracic Surgeon
- Years active: 1950–present

Dasari Prasada Rao (born 21 January 1950) is an Indian cardiothoracic surgeon. He was noteworthy for introducing the first open heart surgery to the state of Andhra Pradesh in India and for pioneering advanced medical care at affordable costs. Dasari Prasada Rao has won numerous awards including in 2001 the Padma Shri award, a Civilian award bestowed by the Government of India.

== Career ==
=== Education ===
Rao was born in the east coast of India in a village with no modern amenities. He studied in the local elementary and high schools to go to college at Vijayawada and Guntur of India. He started medical school in Guntur, Andhra Pradesh, India and completed General Surgery Residency in the same medical school. He obtained his M.B.B.S & M.S. from Guntur Medical College. Attracted by the newly emerging cardiac surgery in India, he went to All India Institute of Medical Sciences, New Delhi as a resident in cardiac surgery and obtained his M.Ch training in cardiothoracic surgery in 1979. Since the training in India at that time did not involve coronary bypass surgery, he travelled to New Zealand and England to have further training in cardiovascular thoracic surgery. In Auckland, New Zealand, he worked closely with Sir Brian Gerald Barratt-Boyes (1924–2006), co-author of textbook of cardiac surgery with Dr. Kirklin and was trained by him at Green Lane Hospital, Auckland.

=== Cardiac surgery in Andhra Pradesh ===
Returning to India in 1985, he started the coronary bypass surgery programme at Nizam's Institute of Medical Sciences, Hyderabad. The programme was nurtured into safe patient surgery in few years. Various modes of cardiac surgery were added into the Nizam's Institute of Medical Sciences programme. Residents trained at Nizam's Institute of Medical sciences spread over to various parts of Andhra Pradesh to start new programmes.

=== Mediciti ===
A new hospital by name Mediciti was started by Share foundation, USA. The cardiac surgery programme was started in this hospital in 1994. In 1997, a new company was formed in the name of Quality Care India Ltd with Dr. Dasari Prasada Rao as Director of the company and vice chairman. Cardiac surgery was one of the pillars of this group. Several hospitals were promoted by this company.

=== Director of Nizam's Institute of Medical Sciences ===
Since there was a need for developing public enterprise hospitals with similar technology to that currently available internationally, it was felt new hospitals could be developed in the public sector. Rao was offered the post of Director of Nizam's Institute of Medical Sciences, Hyderabad in 2004.

As director, he helped develop Nizam's medical campus, at Bibinagar Mandal. Several post graduate courses were added during the tenure up to 2010. The university campus of 160 acres of land is situated about 30 km (19 mi) away from this city campus. An accident and emergency hospital and another specialty hospital was developed on the same campus. These projects were added to the overall bed strength of the hospital from 960 beds to 2000 beds.

Rao acted as M.Ch. examiner to many universities including the All India Institute of Medical Sciences, in Delhi.

=== Other work ===
He was faculty director of King George Hospital in Vishakhapatnam, Andhra Pradesh. As the director, he inaugurated and conducted sessions in Continued Medical Education Programme.

In 2009, he launched India's first speaking book in any regional language through World Medical Association, Nizam and Pfizer India introduction of the Indian versions of a "Speaking Book in Telugu for clinical trial participation" to increase awareness about participation in clinical research.

He was also the President of the Indian Association of Cardiothoracic Surgeons.

=== Research ===
During the same period, research collaborations to develop stem cell technologies and regenerative medicine were undertaken to have cell based therapy for various diseases.

In addition, he published papers in various journals including The Annals of Thoracic Surgery and the Asian Cardiovascular and Thoracic Annals.

== Business life ==
He was the co-founder of the Quality Care India Ltd and the group of hospitals associated with it. He subsequently founded Nano hospitals Pte Ltd. The theme of advanced medicine at affordable cost especially when practicing in developing countries is something he considers to be a guiding principle. In 2012 he established an 'Indo-Us' Multi Speciality Hospital at Begumpet, Hyderabad to serve the Poor.

== Personal life ==
Dasari Prasada Rao was married in 1974 to Professor Vijayalakshmi Kodati, daughter of Health Minister, Rajamallu Kodati. He has two daughters.

== Honors ==
Awarded Padmasri in 2001, civilian honor award from the Government of India
