= Architecture of Hyderabad =

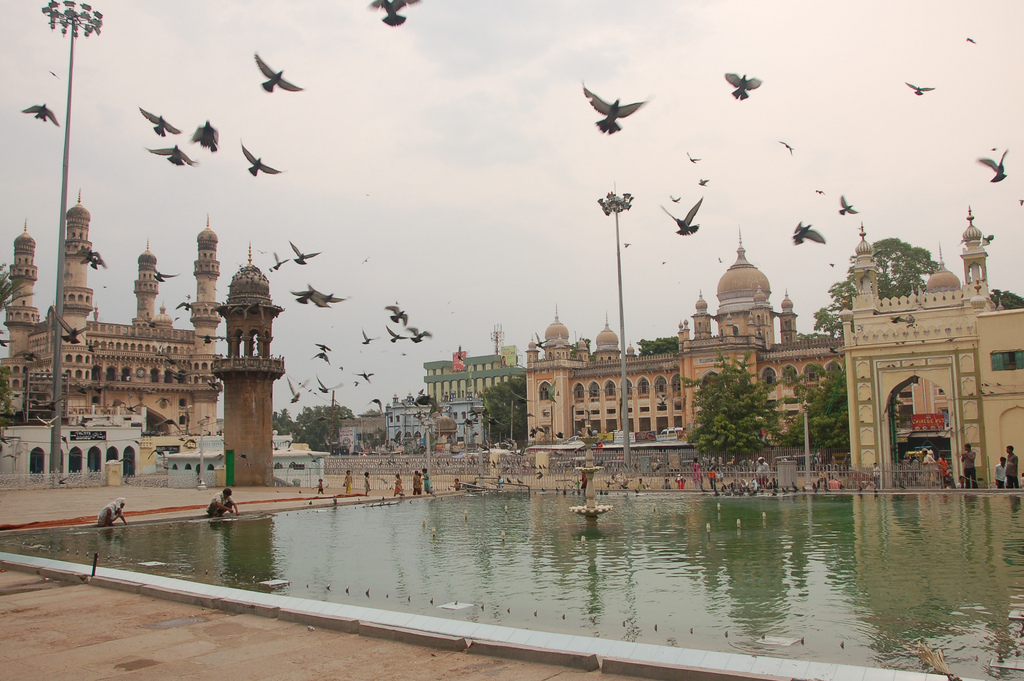
View from Mecca Masjid showing Charminar and Nizamia Hospital.

A distinct Indo-Islamic architecture style with local contribution is reflected in the historical buildings of Hyderabad, making it the first and "Best Heritage City of India" as of March 2012. The city houses many famous historical sites constructed during Qutb Shahi and Asaf Jahi period, including various mosques and palaces.

Hindu Temple Architecture is also seen in the temples of Hyderabad, including the Birla Mandir, Jagannath Temple and Akanna Madanna Temple. Modern architectural styles are seen in most buildings constructed after independence.

== Golconda Sultanate (1591–1687 CE) ==
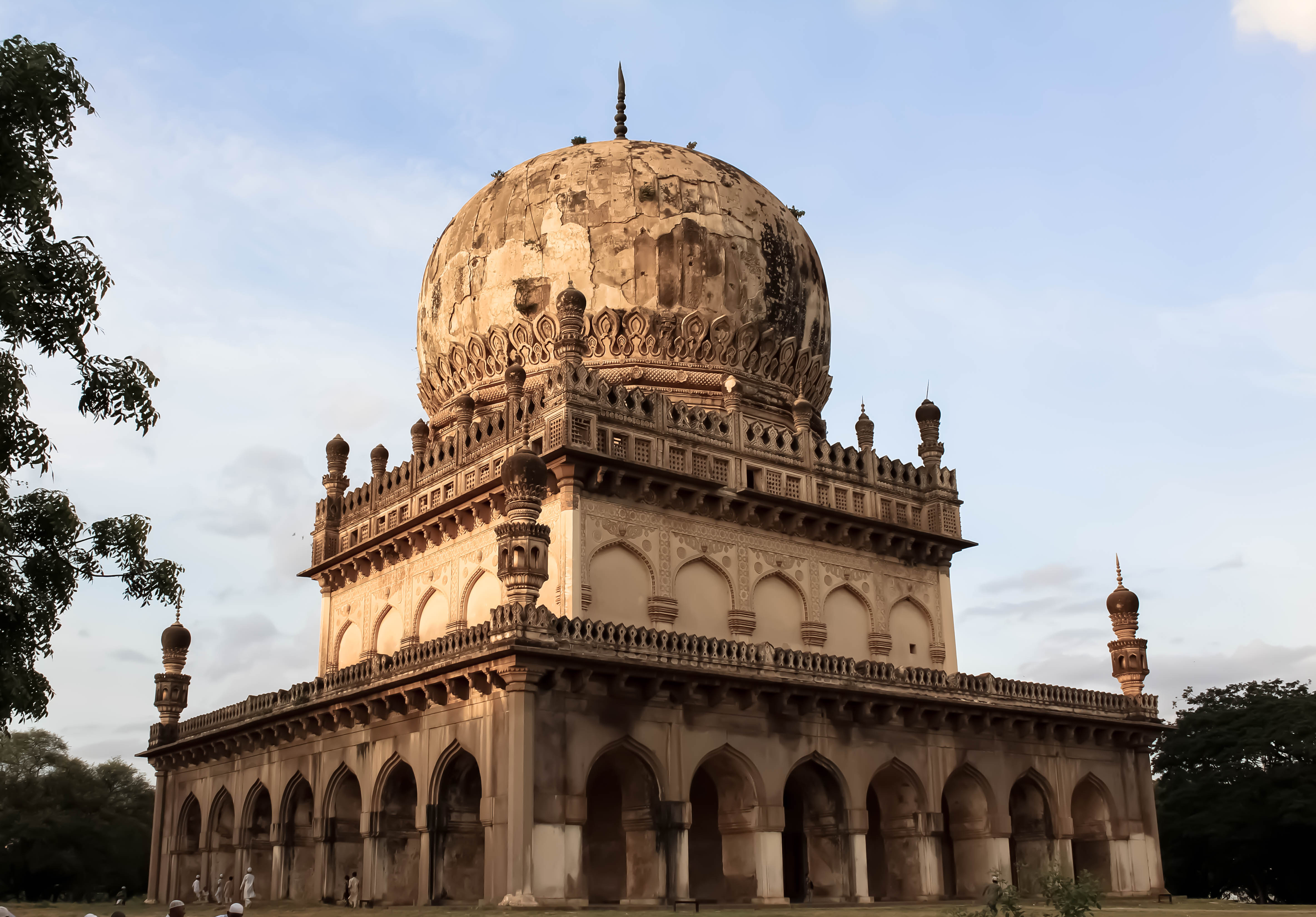
One of the Qutb Shahi Tombs

Qutb Shahi architecture of the 16th and early 17th centuries followed classical Persian architecture featuring domes and colossal arches. Inscriptions in Persian and elaborately carved stucco work are found on most of these buildings. The oldest surviving Qutb Shahi structure in Hyderabad is the ruins of Golconda fort built in the 16th century.

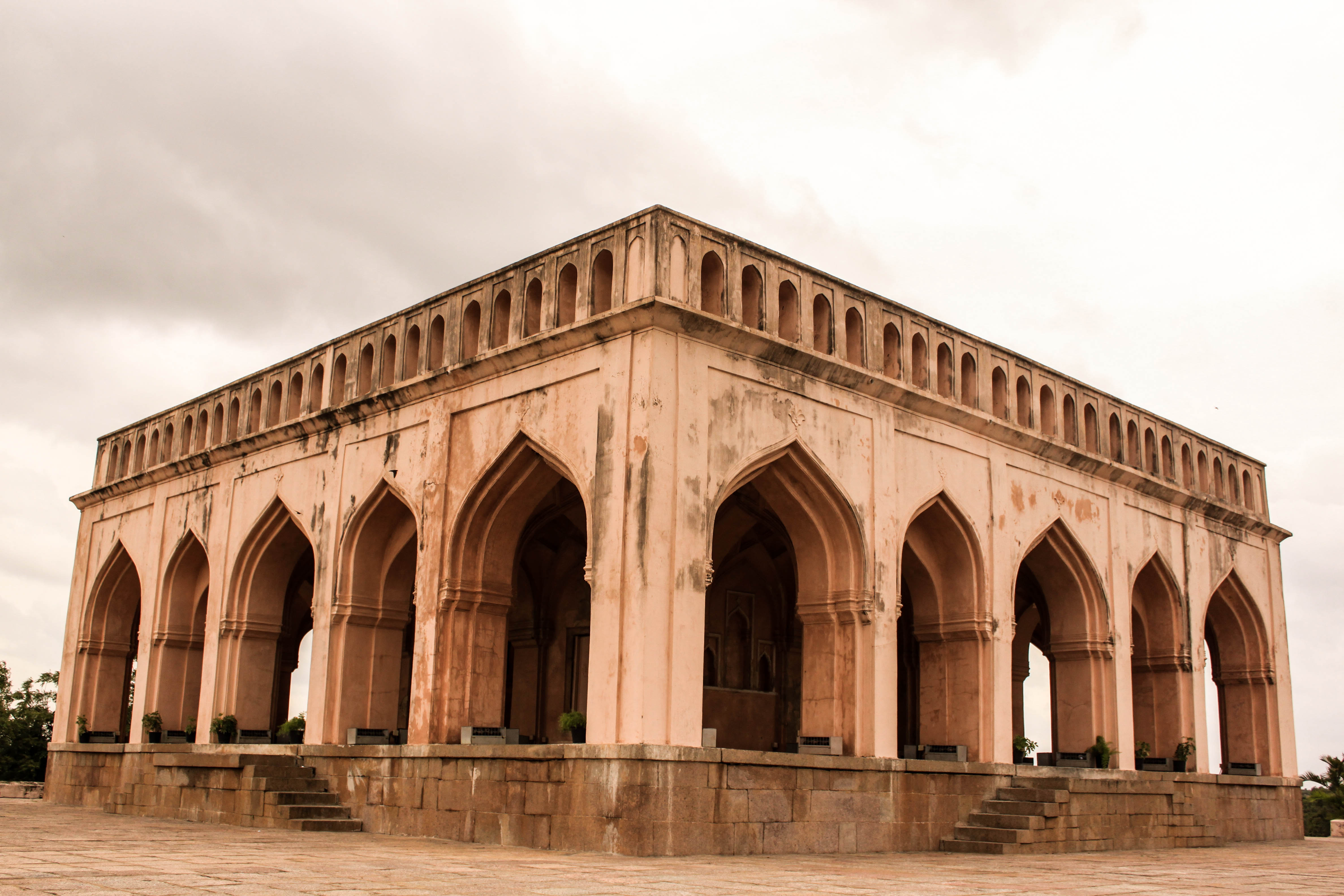
Taramati Baradari

The most important monuments from this time are the Charminar and Mecca Masjid, both built by Mohammed Quli Qutb Shah, the founder of Hyderabad. Most of the historical bazaars that still exist were constructed on the street north of Charminar towards the fort. The Charminar has become an icon of the city, located in the center of old Hyderabad. It is a square structure with sides 20 m (66 ft) long and four grand arches each facing a road. At each corner stands a 56 m (184 ft)-high minaret.

To the north of the Charminar is a public square enclosed by four giant arches, known as the Char Kaman. A fountain called Gulzar Houz is at the center of this area.

Another example is the Qutb Shahi Tombs complex, a complex of tombs of the Qutb Shahi rulers, as well as other royals and noblemen. The domes were originally overlaid with blue and green tiles, of which only a few pieces now remain. The tombs are set in a garden. The complex includes a step-well, hammam (Islamic bathhouse), and a mosque.

The Charminar, Golconda Fort and the Qutb Shahi tombs are considered to be monuments of national importance in India. In 2010, the Indian government proposed that the sites be listed for UNESCO World Heritage status.

The style is also seen in the Taramati Baradari, Premamati Mosque, Khairtabad Mosque, Musheerabad Mosque, Shaikpet Sarai, and Toli Masjid.

== Mughal period (1687–1724 CE) ==
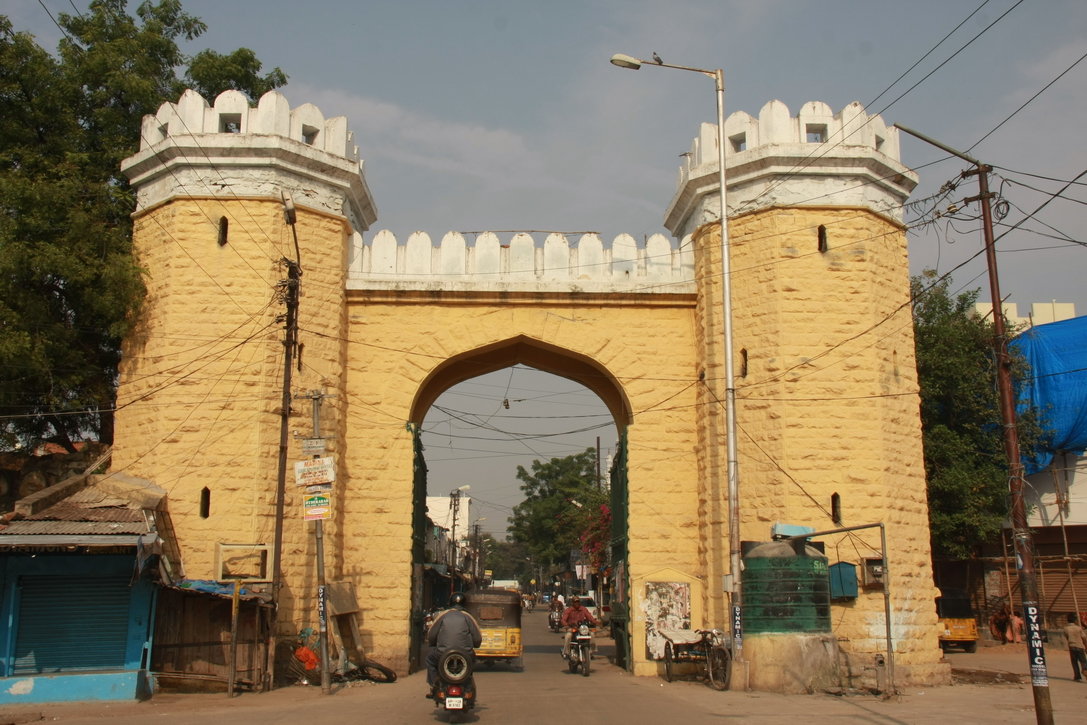
Dabirpura Darwaza, one of the two surviving gateways to the Old City.

The only significant architectural contribution during the brief Mughal rule in Hyderabad was the construction the city wall of Hyderabad, constructed out of granite in typical Mughal defence architecture. The wall had twelve gateways, each wide enough for an elephant to pass through. Mughal emperor Aurangzeb also completed the construction of the Mecca Masjid, adding a gateway and topping the minarets with domes.

== Nizams of Hyderabad (1724-1948 CE) ==
The Nizams of Hyderabad ruled between the 18th and 20th centuries as vassals of the British Empire. Therefore, European architectural styles became prevalent during this period.

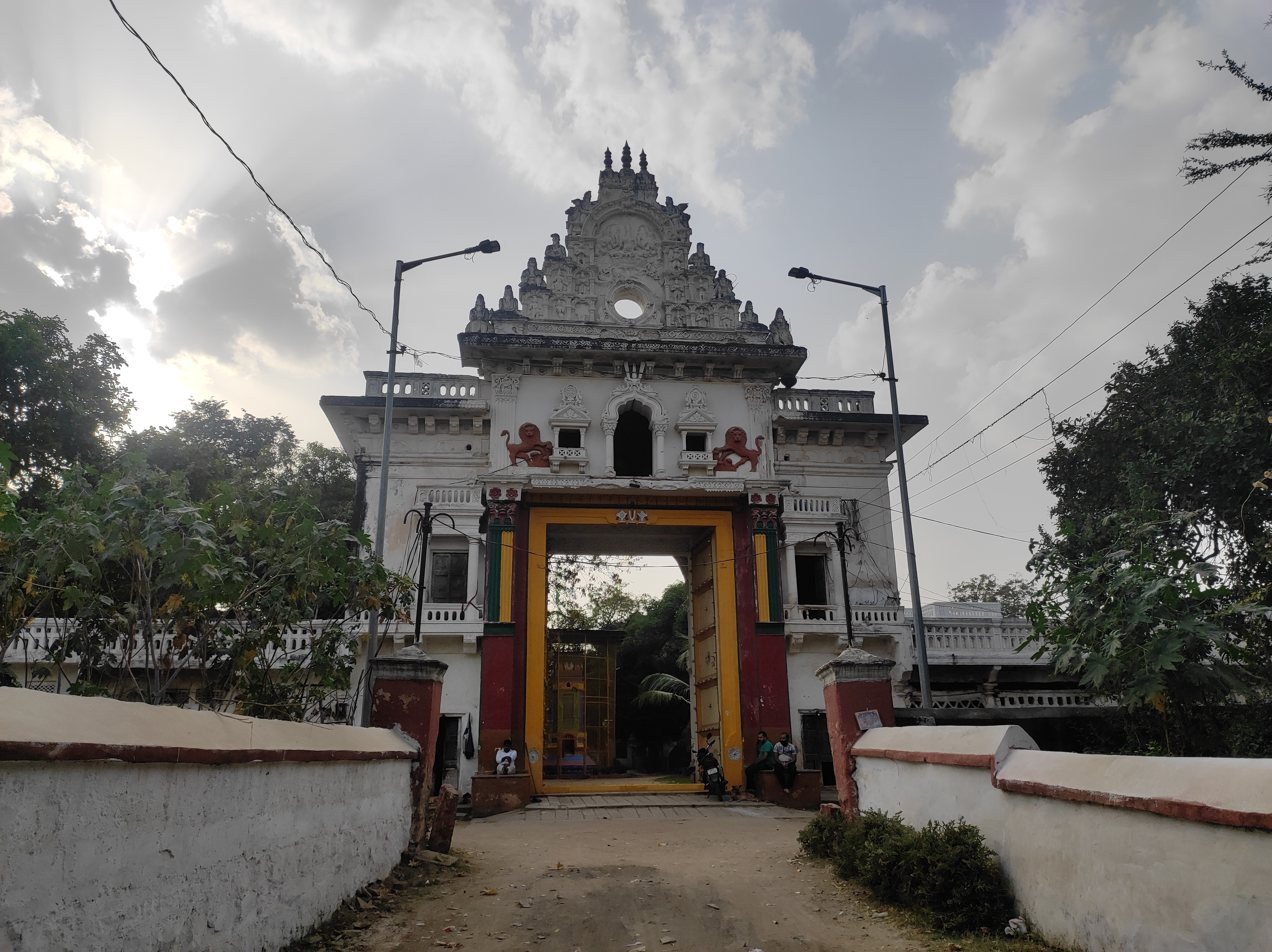
Sitaram Bagh temple built during the Nizam period.

Apart from the Nizams' palaces, the noble families built their own palaces and mansions in Indo-European styles. This includes Diwan Devdi, Asman Garh Palace, Errum Manzil, Khursheed Jah Devdi, Bashir Bagh Palace, Bella Vista, Hill Fort Palace, and Paigah Palace.

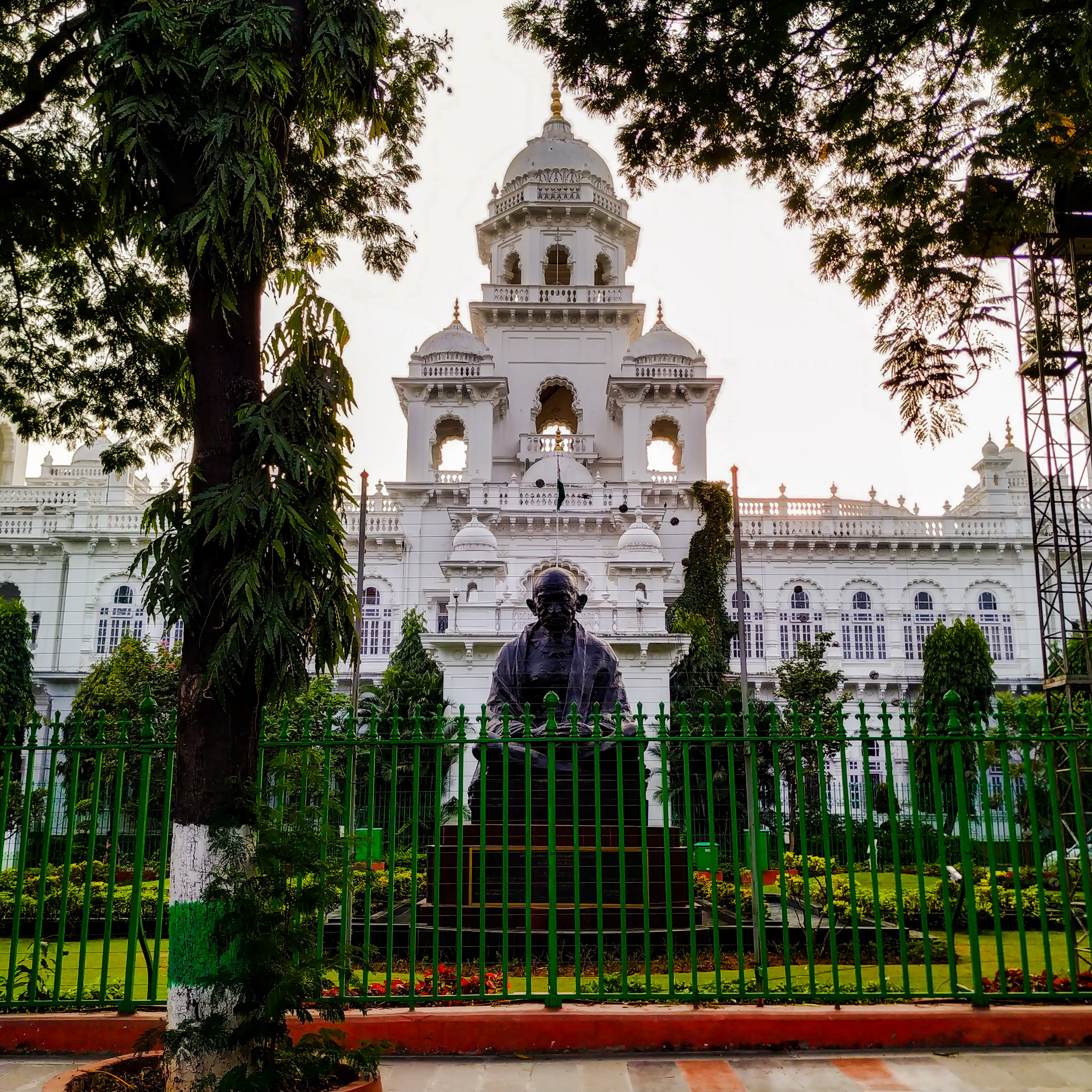
Telangana legislature assembly building completed in 1913

With the introduction of a sizable Christian population, churches including the St. Joseph's Cathedral, St. George's Church, CSI Garrison Wesley Church, and Holy Trinity Church were built in the city, especially in and around Secunderabad, the new city built as a British cantonment.

=== Neoclassical ===
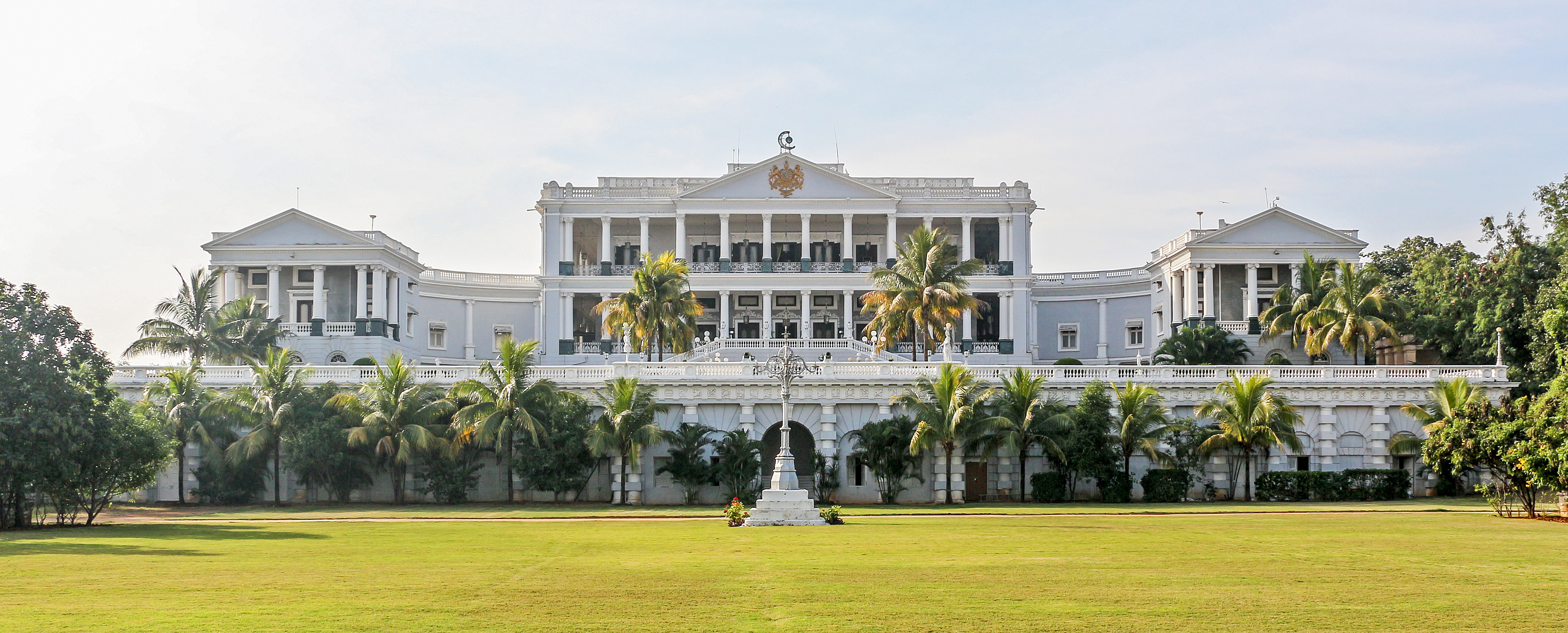
Falaknuma Palace, completed in 1893.

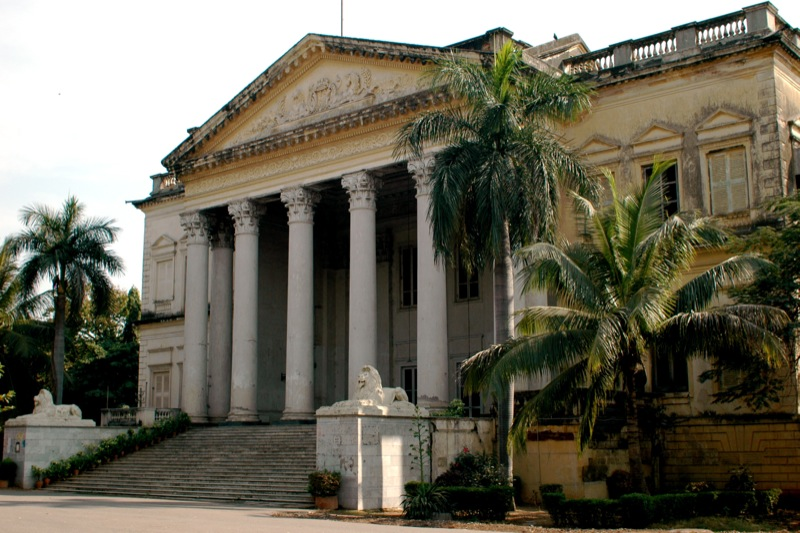
British Residency

The British Residency, completed in 1798, was probably the first major example of neoclassical architecture in Hyderabad. The other examples of neo-classical architecture in Hyderabad includes the various buildings of Chowmahalla Palace

The Falaknuma Palace, used as a guest-house by the Nizam, was inspired by Andrea Palladio's villas. The Nizams applied European styles in some of the palaces such as Falaknuma and King Kothi Palaces.

=== Indo-Saracenic ===
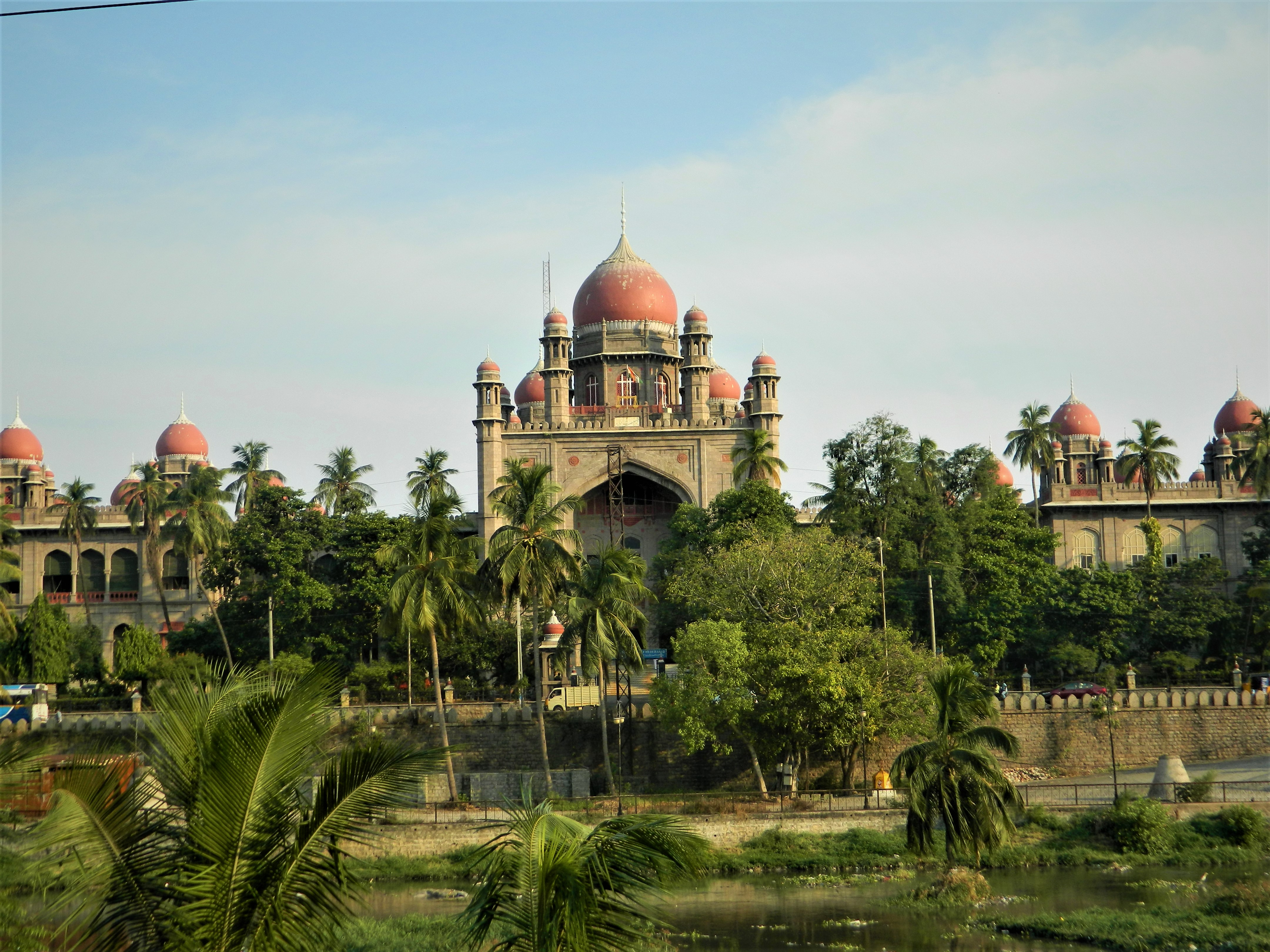
Hyderabad High Court, completed in 1919, was designed in the Indo-Saracenic style by Vincent Esch.

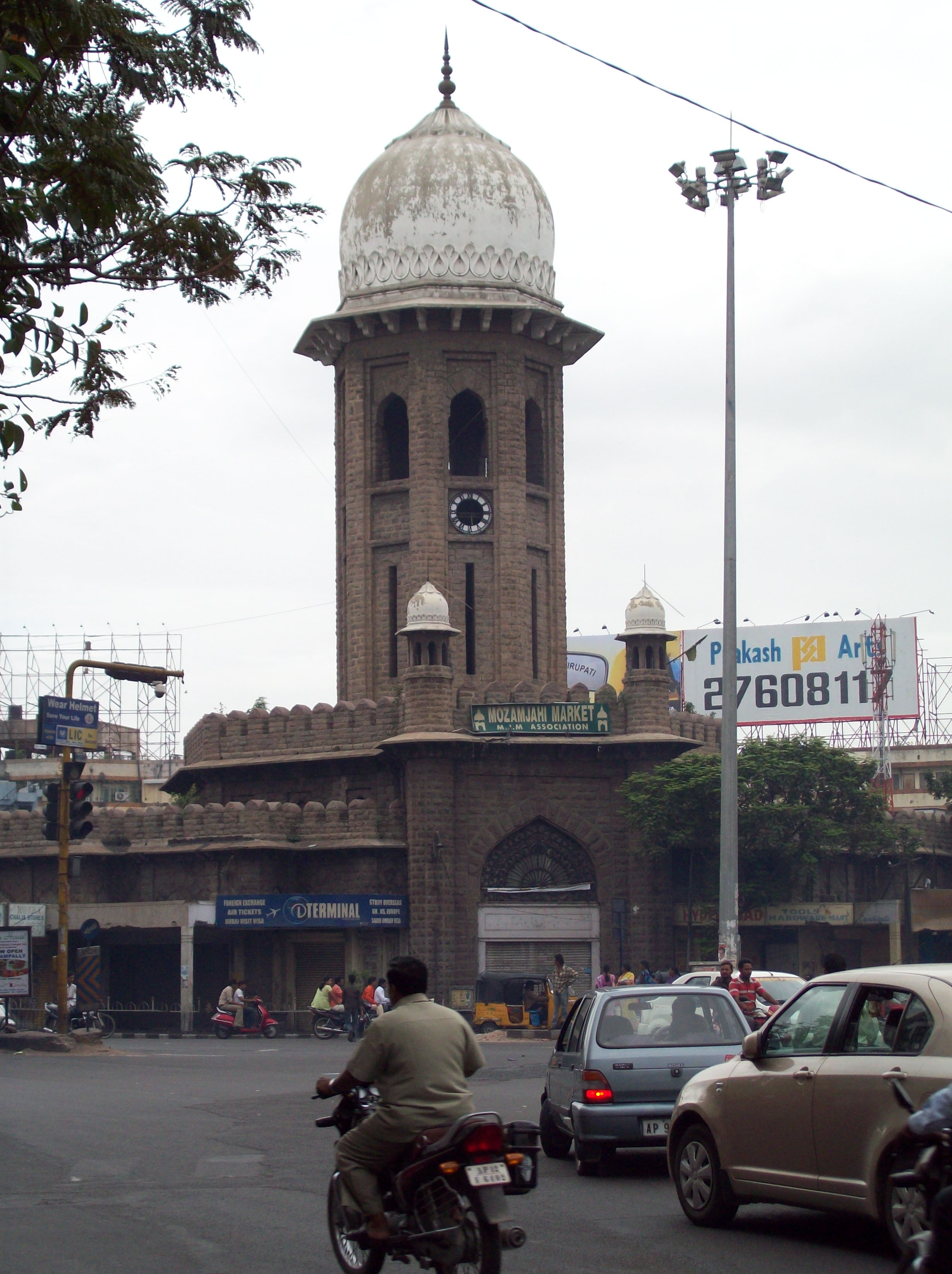
Moazzam Jahi Market

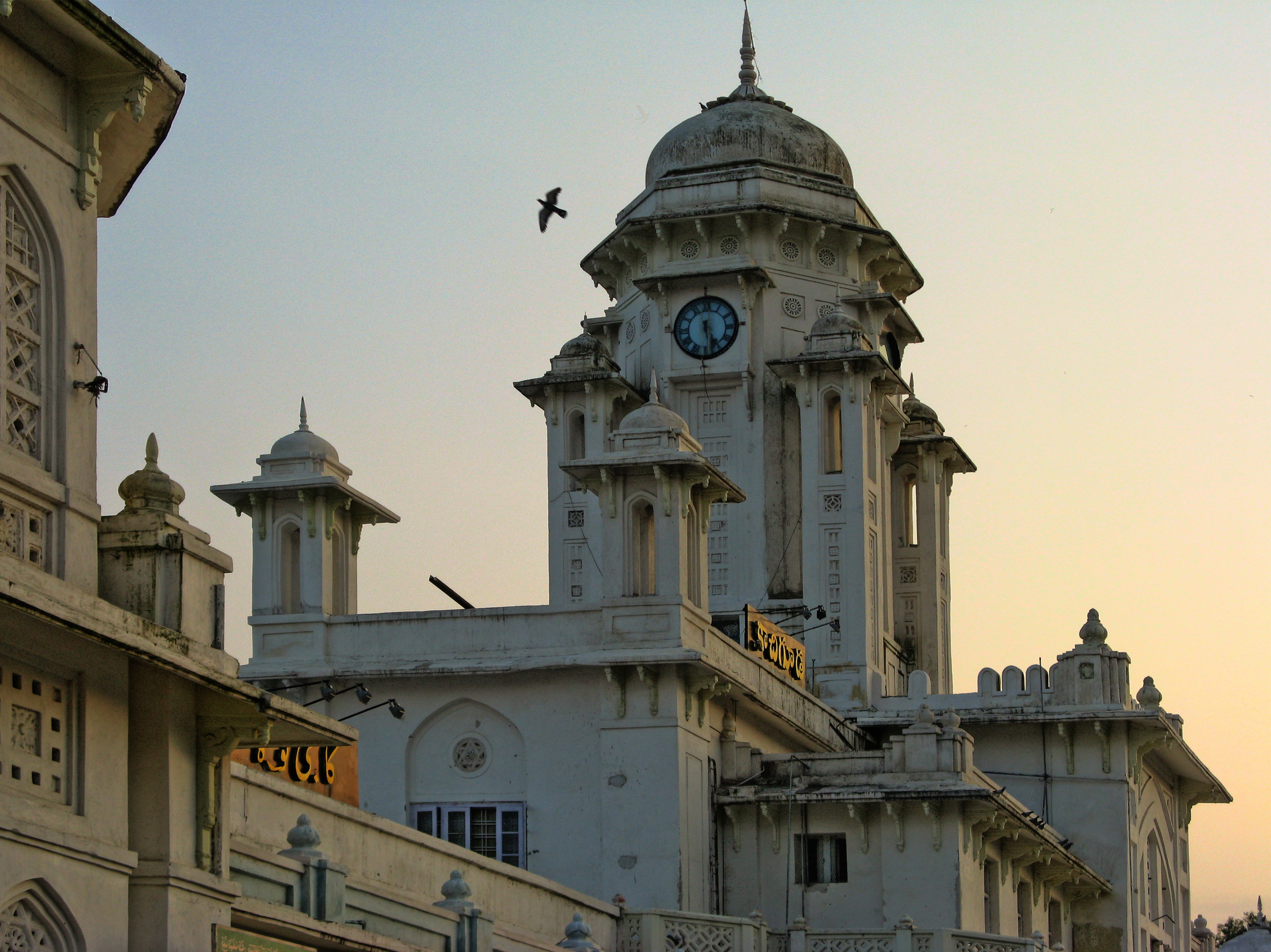
Kacheguda railway station

In the 17th century, Asaf Jahi architecture emerged with palatial style outweighed secular construction. The earliest examples include the Purani Haveli, which served as the seat of the Nizam until the Chowmahalla Palace was constructed. The Chowmahalla Palace, located a stone's throw away from Charminar was constructed over a period of 100 years. It was recently restored and opened to the public. A wide variety of Indian and European styles, ranging from baroque to neoclassical, are seen in the palace

The last Nizam Mir Osman Ali Khan is called as the maker of modern Hyderabad. The buildings constructed during his reign are impressive and represent a rich style of Indo-Saracenic architecture, such as the Osmania University and Moazzam Jahi Market. These buildings are quite distinct from their earlier Qutb Shahi counterparts.

In the early 20th century, the Nizam invited British architect Vincent Esch to design four major public buildings of Hyderabad — the Hyderabad High Court, Osmania General Hospital, City College, and Kachiguda Railway Station. Esch, a pioneer of the contemporary Indo-Saracenic style designed these building in this style combining Indo-Islamic and European features.

The Spanish Mosque, Paigah Tombs, Mahbub Mansion, Saidani Ma Tomb, Aza Khana-e-Zohra, Hill Fort Palace, and Nizamia Hospital, also contribute to the architecture of this period.

=== Art Deco ===
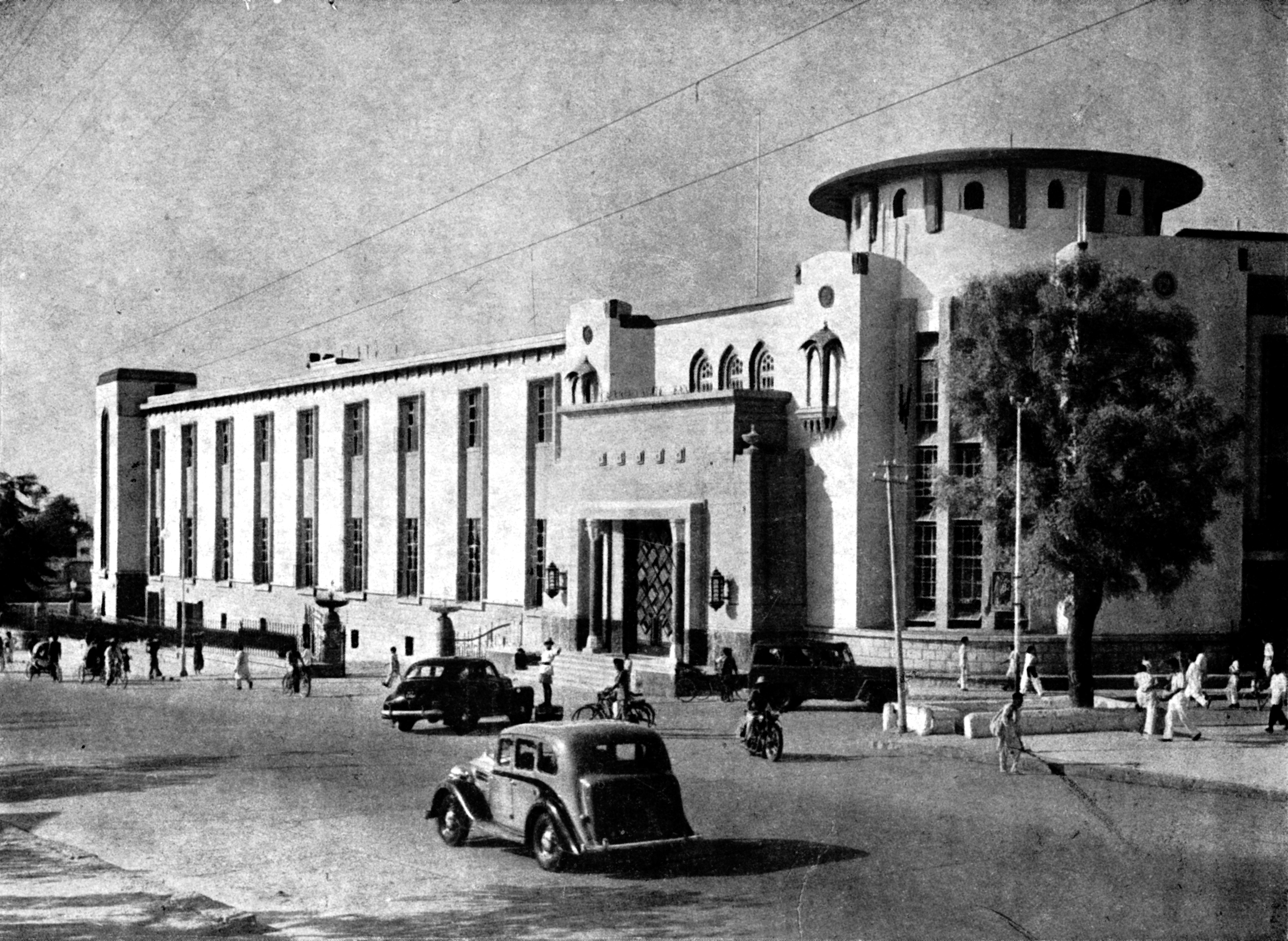
State Bank of Hyderabad building designed by Mohammed Fayazuddin.

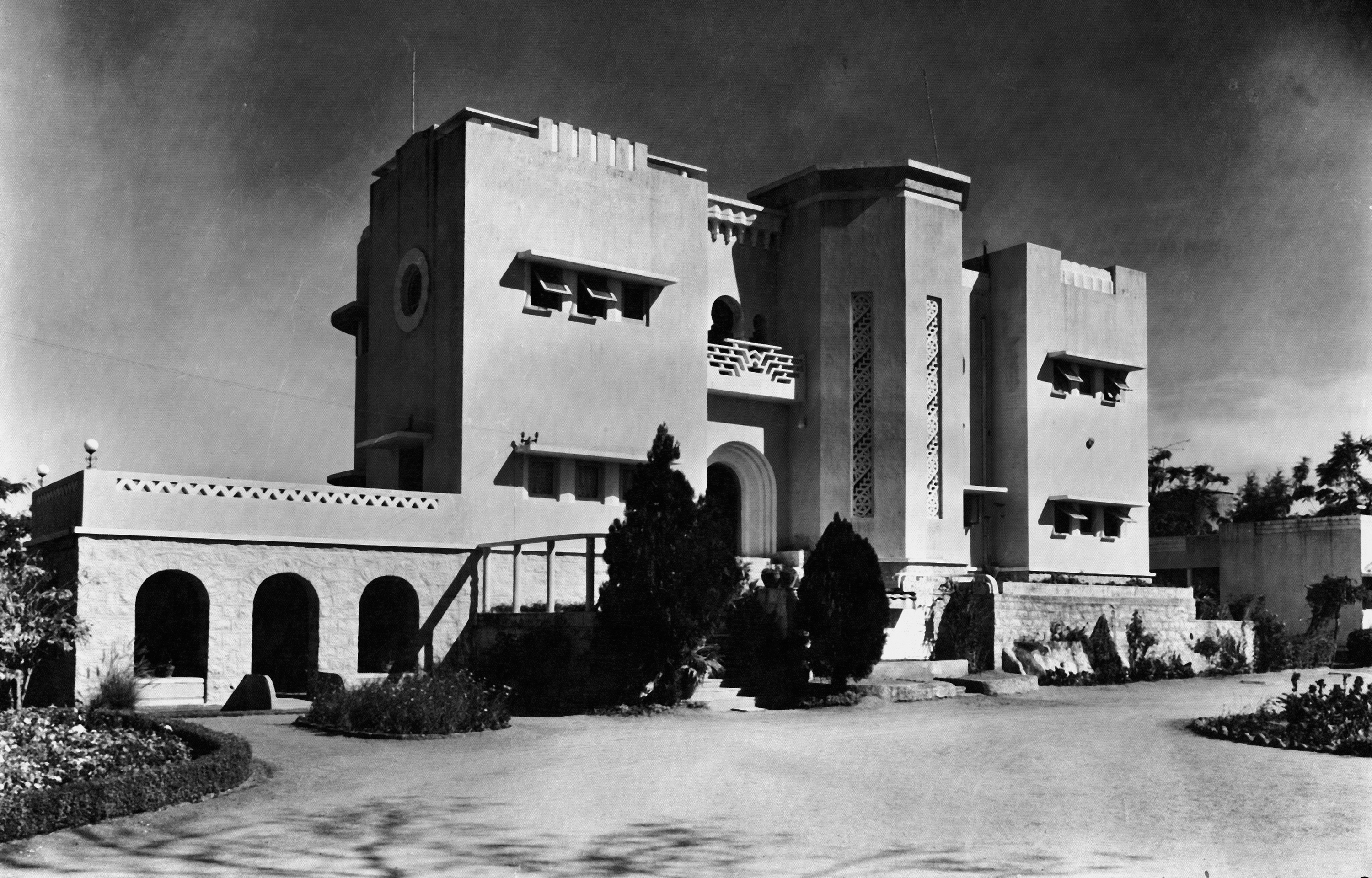
Alhambra in Banjara Hills, residence of Mohammed Fayazuddin.

Art deco buildings were built in the 1930s and 1940s. Art Deco style was introduced to Hyderabad by a German architect called Karl Heinz. The Moazzam Jahi Market, SBH Building, buildings by Mohammed Fayazuddin and a number of cinema halls are examples of such architecture.

== Post-Independence (1947 CE – present) ==
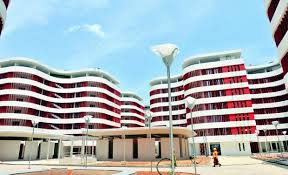
Hostel buildings at the Indian Institute of Technology Hyderabad designed by Christopher Benninger.

In the decades immediately following Indian independence, architecture in Hyderabad was largely utilitarian, characterized by modernist and functionalist civic buildings. However, the city's architectural landscape underwent a dramatic transformation in the late 1990s with the establishment of HITEC City. This marked the introduction of contemporary high-tech architecture, typified by glass-facade IT parks, sprawling corporate campuses, and geometric commercial complexes such as the iconic Cyber Towers.

In the 21st century, particularly in the years following the formation of Telangana, the city experienced a massive vertical growth spurt. Driven by the state government's policy of unlimited Floor Space Index (FSI), western zones such as Gachibowli, Nanakramguda, and Kokapet became the epicenter for a major real estate and architectural boom. This era fundamentally shifted the city's identity from a sprawling, low-rise historical hub to a modern metropolis.

Contemporary architectural trends in the city are increasingly defined by ultra-luxury residential megaprojects and mixed-use developments that incorporate global architectural styles, high-altitude structural engineering, and high-density master planning. A prominent example of this new architectural phase is SAS Crown in Kokapet, which rises over 230 metres and is the tallest building in Hyderabad and South India.
