= Nizam's Institute of Medical Sciences =

Hospital in Hyderabad, Telangana, India

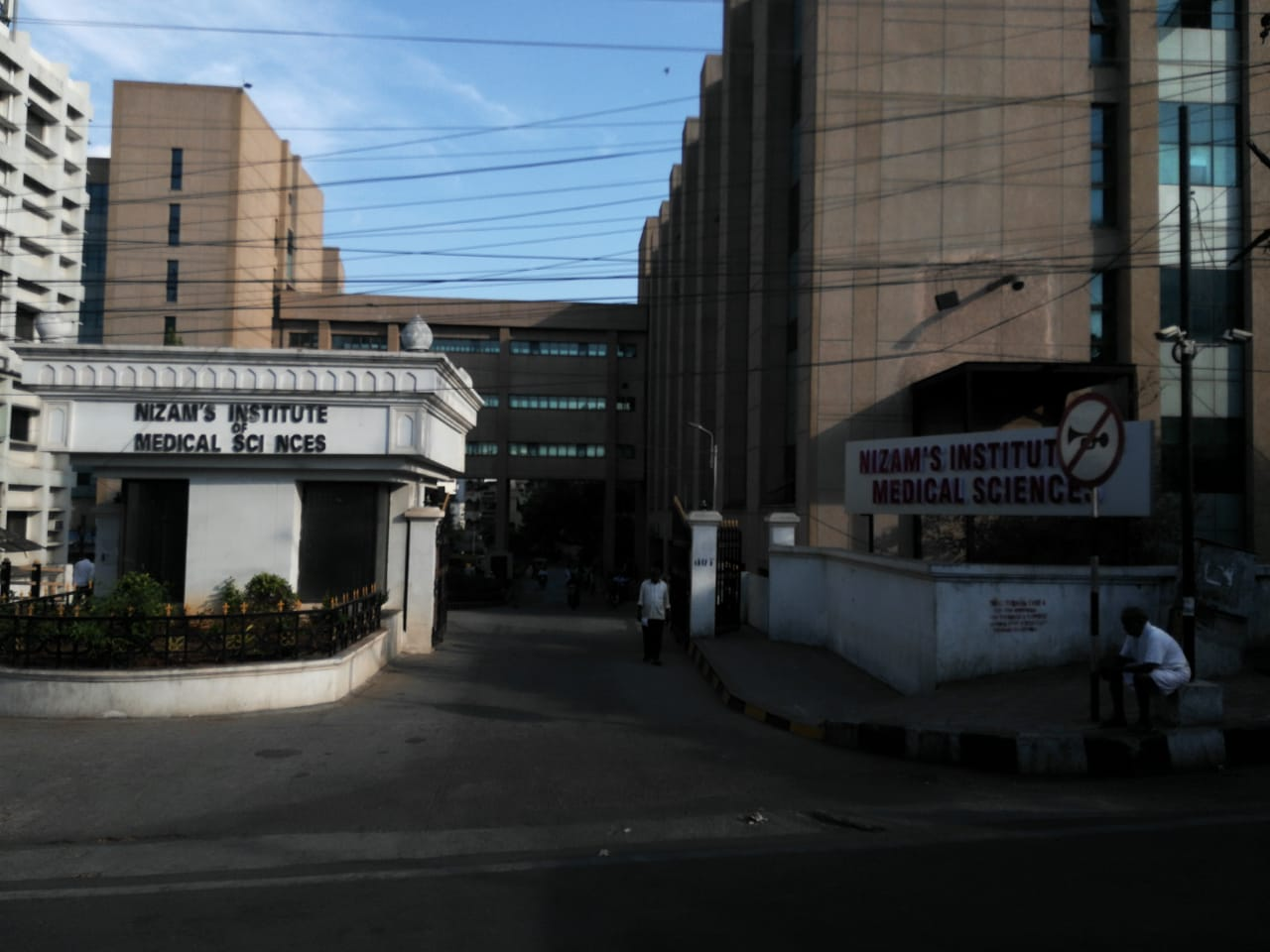
- Type: State university
- Established: 1961; 65 years ago
- Affiliations: UGC, NMC, AIU
- Academic affiliations: Kaloji Narayana Rao University of Health Sciences
- Director: Dr. Rahul Devraj
- Location: Hyderabad, Telangana, India; 17°25′19″N 78°27′07″E
- Campus: Urban
- Nickname: NIMS
- Website: nims.edu.in

Nizam's Institute of Medical Sciences (NIMS) is a public hospital located in Hyderabad, Telangana, India and is named after its founder – the 7th Nizam of the erstwhile Hyderabad State– and was inaugurated by Princess Durrushehvar. It is an State university established by Andhra Pradesh State Legislature. It has a sprawling campus in Punjagutta.

== Overview ==
NIMS is recognized by National Medical Commission. It is administered under the supervision of the Governing Council, Executive Board, Director and other statutory bodies.

It publishes the monthly journal "The Clinical Proceedings of Nizam's Institute of Medical Sciences" for the last 20 years.

== History ==
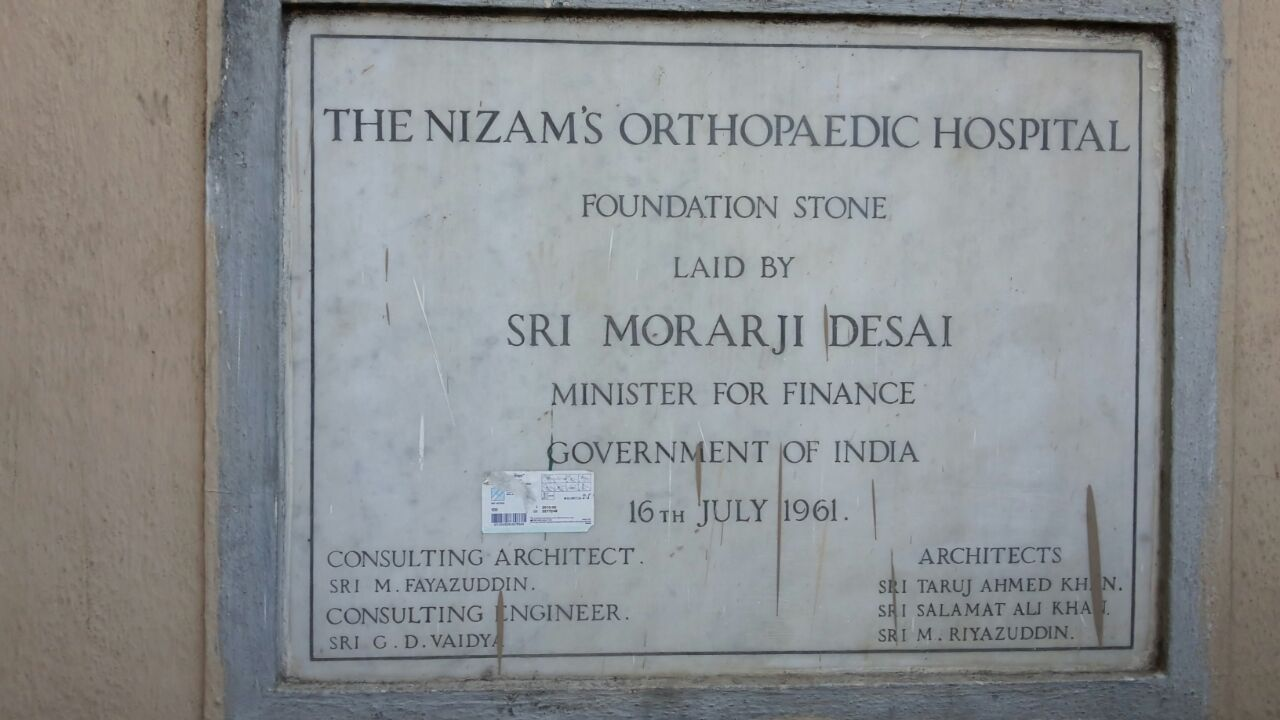
Foundation stone laid by Morarji Desai, 1961

The Nizam's Orthopaedic Hospital was inaugurated by Sri S. K. Patil, Union Minister for Railways on 22 December 1964. The first Superintendent of the hospital was M. Ranga Reddy, a well known Orthopedic Surgeon, who convinced the 7th Nizam to build a specialty hospital for Orthopedics and played an important role in its construction. The hospital was under the H.E.H. the Nizam's Charitable Trust until it was handed over to AP Government. Dr. Ranga Reddy was the administrator of the hospital also till then.

== Academics ==
The institute conducts MD, MS, M.Ch., DM, Ph.D. courses in about 40 disciplines that are recognized by National Medical Commission and issues certificates. Apart from this, there are various paramedical post graduate diploma courses being conducted by the institute.

== Infrastructure Development ==
The institute has expanded its facilities in 2013 with two new hospital blocks. This expansion, designed by Manchanda Associates, consists of a 300 bedded Super Specialty Hospital and a 200 bedded Accident & Trauma Hospital, with a connecting corridor interlinking the two blocks.

In November of 2022, The Telangana government has approved a ₹1,571 crore expansion project for the Nizam’s Institute of Medical Sciences (NIMS), aiming to enhance healthcare services with an additional 2,000 beds, including 500 ICU beds, and expanding the number of departments to 42.

== Notable alumni ==
- Sree Bhushan Raju, Indian nephrologist

== Notable faculty ==
- Kakarla Subba Rao, eminent radiologist
- B. Somaraju, eminent cardiologist
- D. Prasada Rao, cardiothorasic surgeon, Padma Shri-awardee
- Lavu Narendranath, orthopedic surgeon, Padma Shri-awardee

== See also ==
- Hospitals established in Hyderabad State
- Government Nizamia General Hospital
