= Subrahmanyam Karuturi =

Subrahmanyam Karuturi is an Indian consultant physician, diabetologist, and research scholar born in 1981 specialising in diabetes and internal medicine. He currently serves as chief physician at Kify Hospital, Rajahmundry, India. He is also the founder of Kify Hospital.

== Education ==
Subrahmanyam obtained his graduate medical education (MBBS) at Guntur Medical College (Guntur, India). Later he did his MD from JSS Medical College in Mysore, Karnataka.

== Research and career ==
Subrahmanyam's research interests and specialties include Infectious Diseases, Diabetes, Internal Medicine & Blood Diseases.

== Awards and honors ==
- Fellow, American College of Physicians, USA.

== Selected publications ==
- Long COVID-19: A Systematic Review
- Basavanagowdappa, H; Babu, MS; Karuturi, S (June 2011). "HIV infection and thromboembolism". The Journal of the Association of Physicians of India. 59: 380–2. PMID 21751595.
- Chakravarthy, D.J.K.; Sarma, Y.S.; Sriharibabu, M.; Subhramanyam, K.; Sivakumar, T.; Chandrakanth, K. (September 2013). "Bardet–Biedl syndrome presenting as dilated cardiomyopathy". Journal of Indian College of Cardiology. 3 (3): 134–138. doi:10.1016/j.jicc.2013.05.002.
- Intermittent Fasting and Diabetes Reversal
- Emphysematous pyelonephritis in a non-diabetic young woman: A rare association
