= Guntur Medical College =

Medical college in Guntur, India

Coordinates: 16°17′52.32″N 80°26′16.18″E

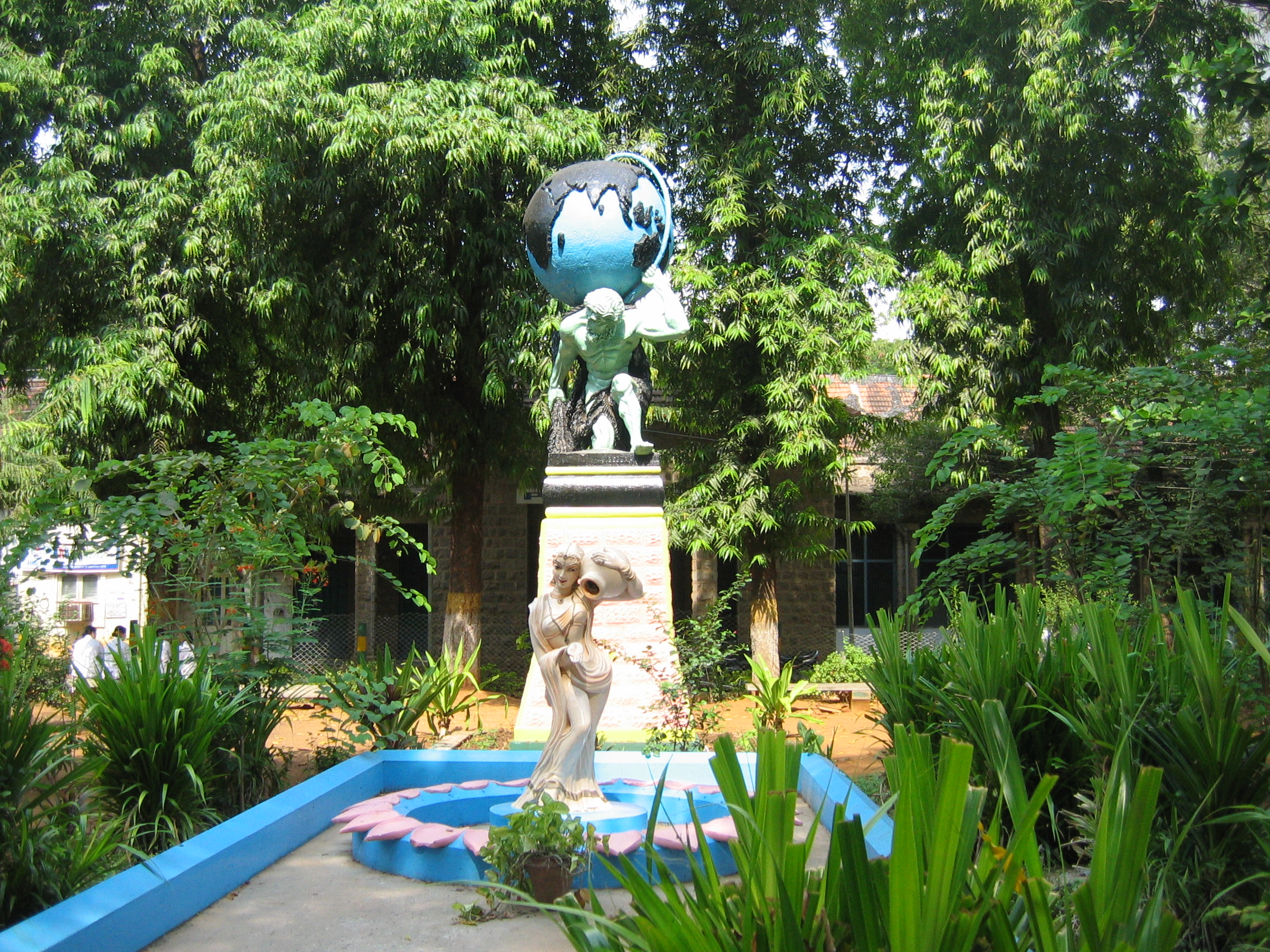
- Motto: Truth. Knowledge. Infinity.
- Type: Medical College
- Established: 1946; 80 years ago
- Principal: Dr N V Sundara Chary
- Location: Guntur, AP, India
- Campus: City
- Website: http://gunturmedicalcollege.edu.in/

Guntur Medical College is a medical college in Guntur, India. It offers graduate and undergraduate courses in medical sciences. The college is affiliated to Dr. NTR University of Health Sciences. India's senior neurologist and recipient of FAAN (Fellow of American Academy of Neurology) award Dr N.V.Sundara Chary is currently heading the medical college and is serving as Principal of the college.

The college works in conjunction with Government General Hospital-Guntur, a tertiary care hospital with 1500 beds, catering to the health needs of the public of the coastal belt of Andhra Pradesh, India.

== Departments ==
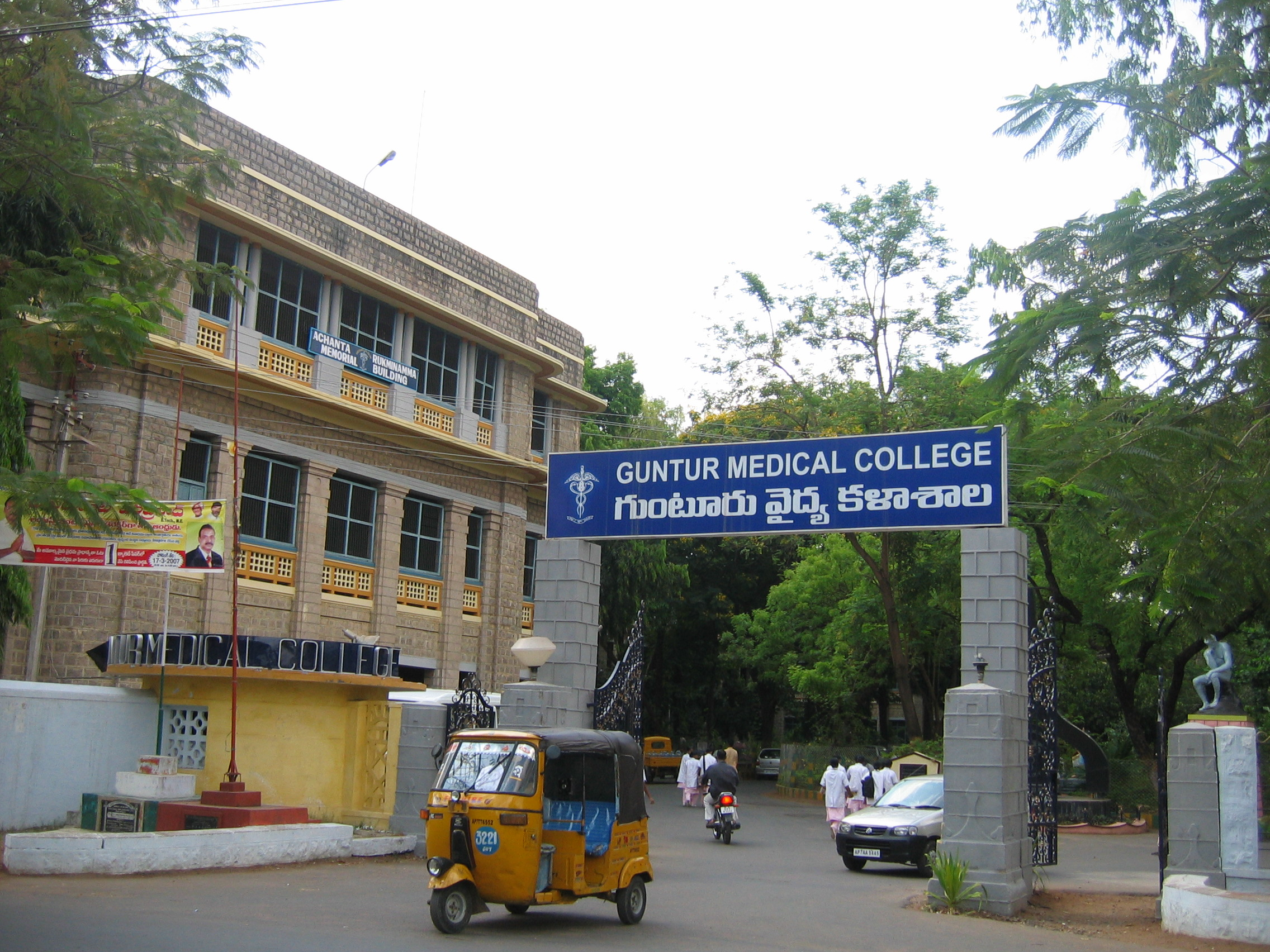
Main campus

- Departments in the college campus: Anatomy, Biochemistry, Physiology, Pharmacology, Microbiology, Forensic Medicine, Pathology, Social & Preventive Medicine
- Departments in the hospital campus Casualty (Emergency Medicine), Internal Medicine, Paediatrics, Cardiology, Neurology, Venereology, Dermatology, Nephrology, Gastroenterology, Radiodiagnosis, Radiotherapy, Psychiatry, Neurology, Anaesthesiology, Fever Hospital, Surgery, Orthopaedics, ENT, Plastic Surgery, Paediatric Surgery, Urology, Neurosurgery, Ophthalmology, Dentistry, Obstetrics & Gynaecology
- The main campus works with the Guntur General Hospital on various issues. It is one of the few centers in the country to have satellite-based training.

== History ==
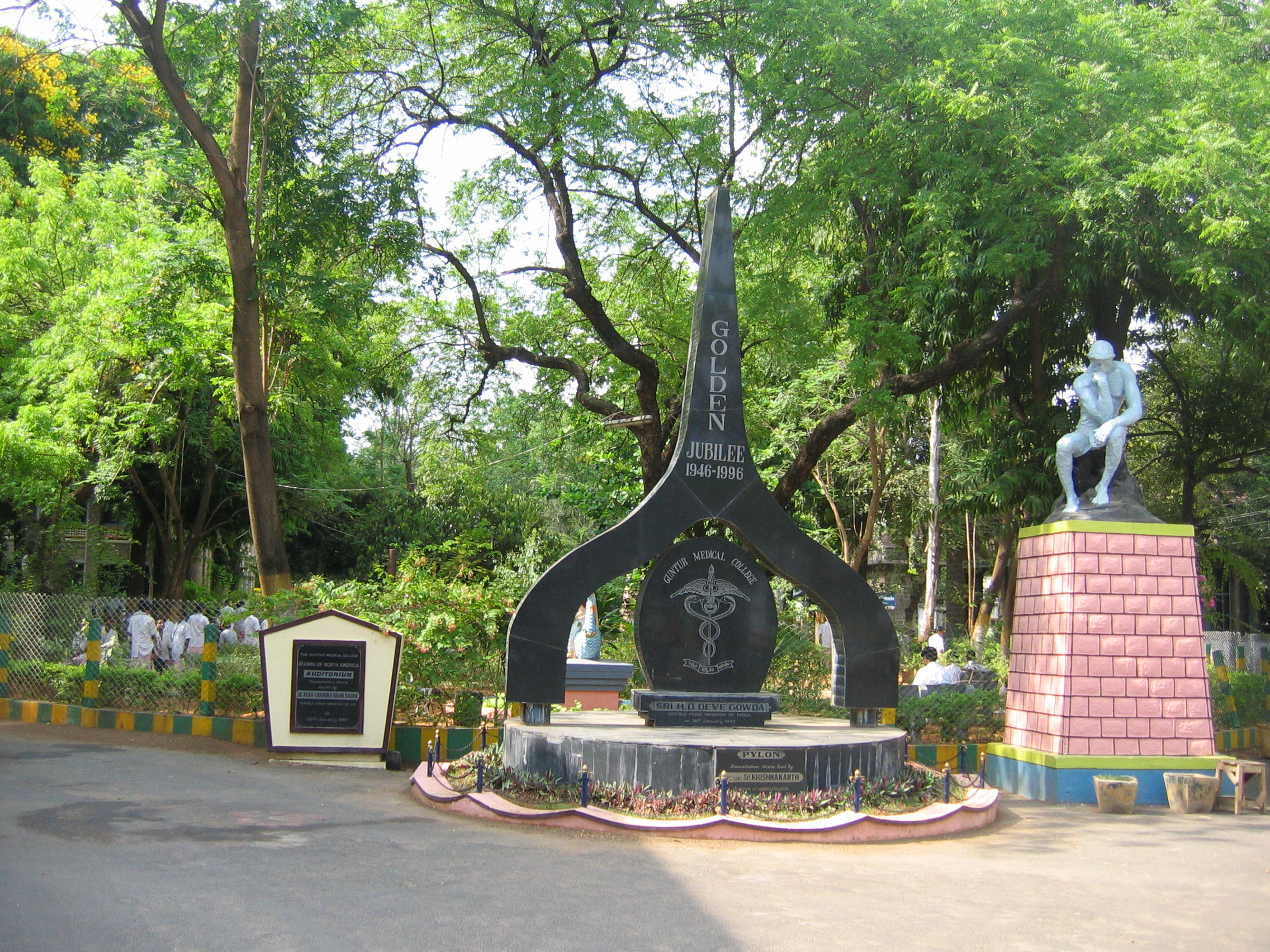
Golden Jubilee

It was originally intended to be opened in Jan 1921. But this was not done, because the number of qualified applicants were not sufficient to fill the admissions in existing medical schools of that time. The construction of the college was started in 1946. In July 1954, clinical courses started. The college began with 50 undergraduate students. By 1960, the number was 150 students in the clinical subjects in 1958.

The college admits 78 postgraduate students every year. In addition to the undergraduate and postgraduate teaching, the college trains paramedical staff like radiographers, lab technicians, lab attendants, pharmacists, nurses, and sanitary inspectors.

After the formation of the AP University of Health Sciences in 1989, it was affiliated to APUHS (now it is NTRUHS), Vijayawada.

Quiz programmes were conducted at college and national Levels to explore the skills of the students. There are sports activities and GMC students have won the University blues and athletic awards. GMC also has arts and cultural activities.

There is a students' co-operative store and a students' canteen on the campus.

The library accommodates 150 undergraduate students and 50 postgraduate students and has accommodation for staff. A reading room has been constructed by GMCANA for the benefit of students. The male students have hostel facilities located on the Amaravathi Road about 3 km. from the college. There are two buildings which provide accommodation for 302 students. A ladies' hostel opposite to Guntur Officers Club provides accommodation for 210 female students. There are college buses for the transport of students from the hostel to the college and hospital. Both hostels are located in an area which serves as a playground for sports activities.

Guntur General Hospital has a bed count of 1038. The OP departments provide medical relief for between four and five thousand people daily. The hospital houses an interns' hostel, a postgraduates' hostel, and a nursing school.

== Notable alumni ==
- Dasari Prasada Rao, cardiothoracic surgeon
- Bhupathiraju Somaraju, cardiologist, surgeon, Chairman of CARE Hospitals
- Gopi Chand Mannam, cardiothoracic surgeon, Managing Director of Star Hospitals, Padma Shri recipient
- Jayaprakash Narayana, IAS, founder and President of Loksatta, Ex.MLA (Kukatpally), Andhra Pradesh
- Kodela Siva Prasad, General Surgeon and prominent politician of TDP from Narasarao Peta, Ex.MLA, Ex.Minister and First Speaker of Legislative Assembly of residual Andhra Pradesh from 2014–2019.
- Yarlagadda Nayudamma, pediatric surgeon
- Subrahmanyam Karuturi, Internal Medicine Specialist and Managing Director of Kify Hospital
