= Lavu Narendranath =

Indian orthopedic surgeon

- Born: Andhra Pradesh, India
- Occupation: Orthopedic surgeon
- Awards: Padma Shri

Lavu Narendranath is an Indian orthopedic surgeon, medical researcher and the director of Nizam's Institute of Medical Sciences, Hyderabad.

== Career ==
After graduating in medicine and securing a master's degree (MS), he joined NIMS and worked there till his superannuation as Associate Dean on 31 August 2013, but was asked to continue as the director of the institution. His appointment was unsuccessfully challenged in court but he has been serving the institution since then and major developments are reported during his tenure. He has worked along with A. P. J. Abdul Kalam, renowned scientist and former President of India, in a project for the development of ultra low weight prosthetic limbs for polio-affected persons and amputees. The Government of India awarded him the fourth highest civilian honour of the Padma Shri, in 2005, for his contributions to Indian medicine.
