= Bhupathiraju Somaraju =

Indian cardiologist

- Born: 25 September 1948 (age 77); Akividu, Madras Province, India
- Other name: B. Somaraju
- Education: Guntur Institute of Medical Sciences, PGIMER, JNTU
- Occupations: Cardiologist, teacher
- Known for: Founder of CARE hospitals
- Awards: Padma Shri; India’s Most Admired Cardiologist 2014

Bhupathiraju Somaraju (born 26 July 1946), shortly B. Somaraju, is an Indian cardiologist and was the chairman of CARE Hospitals, Hyderabad. Author of many medical articles in peer reviewed journals and an elected fellow of the National Academy of Medical Sciences, he was honoured by the Government of India, in 2001, with the fourth highest Indian civilian award of Padma Shri.

He has been in the Nizam's Institute of Medical Sciences, Hyderabad, as Professor and Head of the department of Cardiology and Dean of the Institution.

Dr. Somaraju has been working as a Consultant Cardiologist and Mentor Director with Sindhu Hospitals (SY No 41, Sai Sindhu Foundation, 14/2, v, Khanammet, Serilingampalle (M), Hyderabad, Telangana 500084) since October 2024.

Dr Somaraju, along with his team of cardiologists from CARE Hospitals, had moved to Asian Institute of Gastroenterology, Gachibowli, Hyderabad in the month of October 2019.

In 1998, Somaraju with A. P. J. Abdul Kalam developed a low cost coronary stent, named the "Kalam-Raju Stent". In 2012, the duo designed a rugged tablet computer for health care in rural areas, which was named the "Kalam-Raju Tablet".

== See also ==
List of Padma Shri award recipients (2000–09)
