= Sree Bhushan Raju =

Indian nephrologist

Dr Sree Bhushan Raju
- Born: Bhongir, Nalgonda Telangana
- Citizenship: India
- Education: Gandhi Medical College; All India Institute of Medical Sciences; Nizam's Institute of Medical Sciences
- Awards: Meritorious University teacher award by Govt of Telangana
- Scientific career
- Fields: Nephrologist
- Workplaces: Nizam's Institute of Medical Sciences

Sree Bhushan Raju M.D., D.M., Diplomate of National Board, (Telugu: శ్రీ భూషణ్ రాజు) is a nephrologist from Telangana, India. He is currently Senior professor and Unit head of the Dept of Nephrology at Nizam's Institute of Medical Sciences, Panjagutta, Hyderabad, one of the largest nephrology teaching departments in India having ten DM students. He is one of the principal investigators of the CKD task force run by the Indian Council of Medical Research (ICMR) to evaluate the prevalence of CKD in the adult urban population in India. He is an associate editor of the Indian Journal of Nephrology, Indian Journal of Organ Transplantation, and Frontiers in Medicine. He advocates for public health and early detection of non-communicable disease. He frequently writes editorials in various regional (Eenadu, Andhra Jyothi) and national newspapers about quality of care, public health, and health care systems.

== Early life and education ==
Raju was born in Bhongir, a small town in Telangana. He had his primary schooling in DVM High School, Nalgonda. He joined AP Residential College (APRJC) in Nagarjuna Sagar and in 1988 joined Gandhi Medical College in Hyderabad for his MBBS. He secured a top rank in the All India competitive examination and joined Nizam's Institute of Medical Sciences in Hyderabad to pursue his MD (Gen. Medicine) for his post-graduation in 1998. Later, he joined the prestigious All India Institute of Medical Sciences in New Delhi, India to complete a DM in nephrology, and became a faculty member in July 2002. He got a DNB in nephrology in which he received the gold medal. Later, he completed an MBA in health care management from ICFAI. Kidney transplantation, clinical nephrology, CAPD, and CRRT are his main focus. He was elected twice (in 2015 and 2023) as the NIMS Faculty Association president.

== Career ==
Raju has served as head of the Department of Nephrology at NIMS since 2013. The peritoneal dialysis and kidney transplantation program expanded significantly during his tenure.The live related renal transplantation increased from only a few cases to more than 100 each year, and the Nephrology Department has utilized the Jeevandhan program of Telangana and increased its cadaver transplantation significantly.

He, along with several of his students, presented several scientific papers in various national and international conferences. He received the best paper award from the Japanese Society of Dialysis Therapy in 2007. He has published scientific papers in The Lancet (Global Burden of Disease), the Nephrology Dialysis Transplantation (NDT), Nephrology (Carlton), the American Journal of Nephrology, Hemodialysis International, the Indian Journal of Nephrology, JAPI, etc. He is one of the principal investigators of the CREDENCE, TESTING and ACHIEVE trials, and was a principal investigator in the CKD task force run by ICMR to study the prevalence of CKD in India. The International Society of Nephrology recognized him as Educational Ambassador and Mentor in the Mentor – Mentee Programme.

He was a Governing Council member of the Indian Society of Nephrology (ISN), Indian Society of Organ Transplantation (ISOT), Peritoneal Dialysis Society of India (PDSI), and Indian Academy of Nephrology (IAN), and was elected as the hon. Secretary of the Indian Society of Peritoneal Dialysis in 2019. He reviews for several peer-reviewed journals and is on the editorial board of several journals. He is the associate editor of the Indian Journal of Nephrology. He collaborates with the "Global Burden of Disease" (GBD) from India and is the examiner for DM (nephrology) students of several universities in India as well as the National Board of Examinations. He was the organizing secretary for IANCON in 2011 and ISOTCON in 2018 (both national conferences) and organised several CMEs and workshops. He was selected as the academic senate member of Mahatma Gandhi University in Nalgonda and PhD Committee member of the Rajiv Gandhi University of Health Sciences in Bangalore, Karnataka.

He is a prolific speaker and delivered lectures in many conferences of nephrology and medicine. He also participates in panel discussions on TV channels such as Doordarshan, TV9, ETV, NTV, and All India Radio. He writes columns for newspapers like Eenadu and Mana Telangana. He is quoted on various kidney diseases through electronic media.

He delivered several talks on YouTube about health and diseases. The IMA headquarters in Delhi awarded him the Corona Warrior award on Doctors' Day in 2020.

== Awards and recognition ==
- Prof. H.L. Trivedi Gold Medal in Nephrology - 2002
- FICP: Indian College of Physicians Association of Physicians of India, January 2012
- FIACM: Fellowship of Indian Association of Clinical Medicine (IACM), October 2012
- MNAMS: Member National Academy of Medical Sciences
- FISN: Fellowship of Indian Society of Nephrology (ISN), December 2012.
- FISOT: Fellowship of Indian Society of Organ Transplantation 2017
- FASN: Fellowship of American Society of Nephrology 2019
- FACP: Fellowship of American College of Physicians
- Meritorious University Teacher Award from the Government of Telangana in 2017
- Corona Warrior by Indian Medical Association (IMA) 2020

== Publications ==
- Goli R; Raju SB; Uppin MS (May 2018). "Monoclonal Gammopathy of Renal Significance Presenting as Cryoglobulinemic Glomerulonephritis: A Case Report and Review of Literature". Indian Journal of Nephrology. 28 (3): 229–231. doi:10.4103/ijn.IJN_166_16. PMC 5998724. PMID 29962675.
- Post renal transplant diabetes mellitus and hepatitis C: Is there any association. Raju DSB, Agarwal SK, Gupta S, Dash SC, Bhowmick D, Tiwari SC, Guleria S, Mehta SN. Presented as poster in Congress Asian Society of Transplantation (CAST), 2002 held at New Delhi.
- Post-transplant hypertension at one year: Impact on long-term graft survival. Raju DSB, Agarwal SK, Gupta S, Dash SC, Bhowmick D, Tiwari SC, Guleria S, Mehta SN. Presented as poster in Congress Asian society of Transplantation (CAST), 2002 held at New Delhi.
- Prevalence of CRF in India. Agarwal SK, Dash SC, Raju DSB, Irshad M. Presented in racial and ethnic minority groups, official satellite conference in the world congress of Nephrology, 18–20 October 2001, Santaffi, USA.
- Prevalence of chronic renal failure in adults in Delhi, India. Agarwal SK, Dash SC, Irshad M, Raju S, Singh R, Pandey RM, Nephrol Dial Transplant. 2005 Aug; 20 (8): 1638–42.
- Rituximab in the treatment of refractory late acute antibody-mediated rejection: Our initial experience. Surendra M, Raju SB, Raju N, Chandragiri S, Mukku KK, Uppin MS. Indian J Nephrol. 2016 Sep;26(5):317-321
- Revisiting renal amyloidosis with clinicopathological characteristics, grading, and scoring: A single-institutional experience. Kalle A, Gudipati A, Raju SB, Kalidindi K, Guditi S, Taduri G, Uppin MS.J Lab Physicians. 2018 Apr-Jun;10(2):226-231.
- Management of statin intolerance. Raju SB, Varghese K, Madhu K. Indian J Endocrinol Metab. 2013 Nov;17(6):977-82. doi: 10.4103/2230-8210.122602
