= CARE Hospitals =

- Evercare

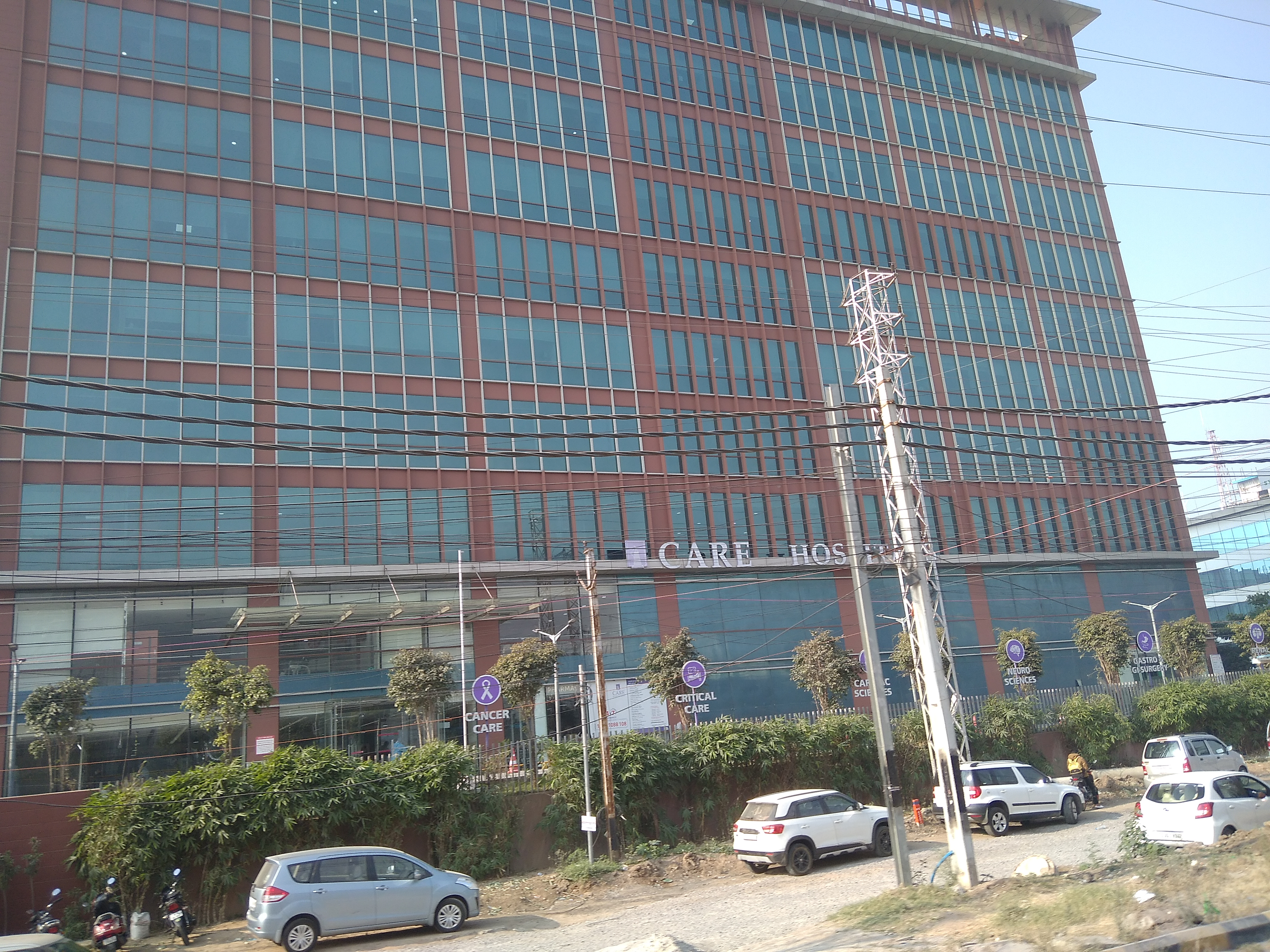
- CARE Hospital building in HITEC City, Gachibowli, Hyderabad.

Geography
- Location: Hyderabad, Telangana, India
- Coordinates: 17°25′06″N 78°26′15″E

Organisation
- Care system: Private

Services
- Emergency department: Yes
- Beds: 2,400

History
- Founded: 1997

Links
- Website: www.carehospitals.com
- Lists: Hospitals in India

CARE Hospitals is a chain of multi-specialty hospitals with 16 hospitals in 7 cities across 6 states of India. The hospital began as a specialty center for heart care and later expanded to include other specialties. Their branches are NABH-accredited,.

== History ==
CARE Hospitals were founded in 1997 by Bhupathiraju Somaraju, chairman of CARE Hospitals Group. CARE Hospital is a specialty hospital for cardiac surgeons, critical care specialists, and emergency medicine specialists.

== Branches ==
State	Locations
Telangana	Hyderabad (Banjara Hills, HITEC City, Nampally, Musheerabad, Malakpet)
Andhra Pradesh	Visakhapatnam (Ramnagar, Arilova)
Maharashtra	Nagpur, Aurangabad
Madhya Pradesh	Indore
Chhattisgarh	Raipur
Odisha	Bhubaneswar

== Locations ==
CARE Hospitals have multiple branches in Banjara Hills, HITEC City (Gachibowli).

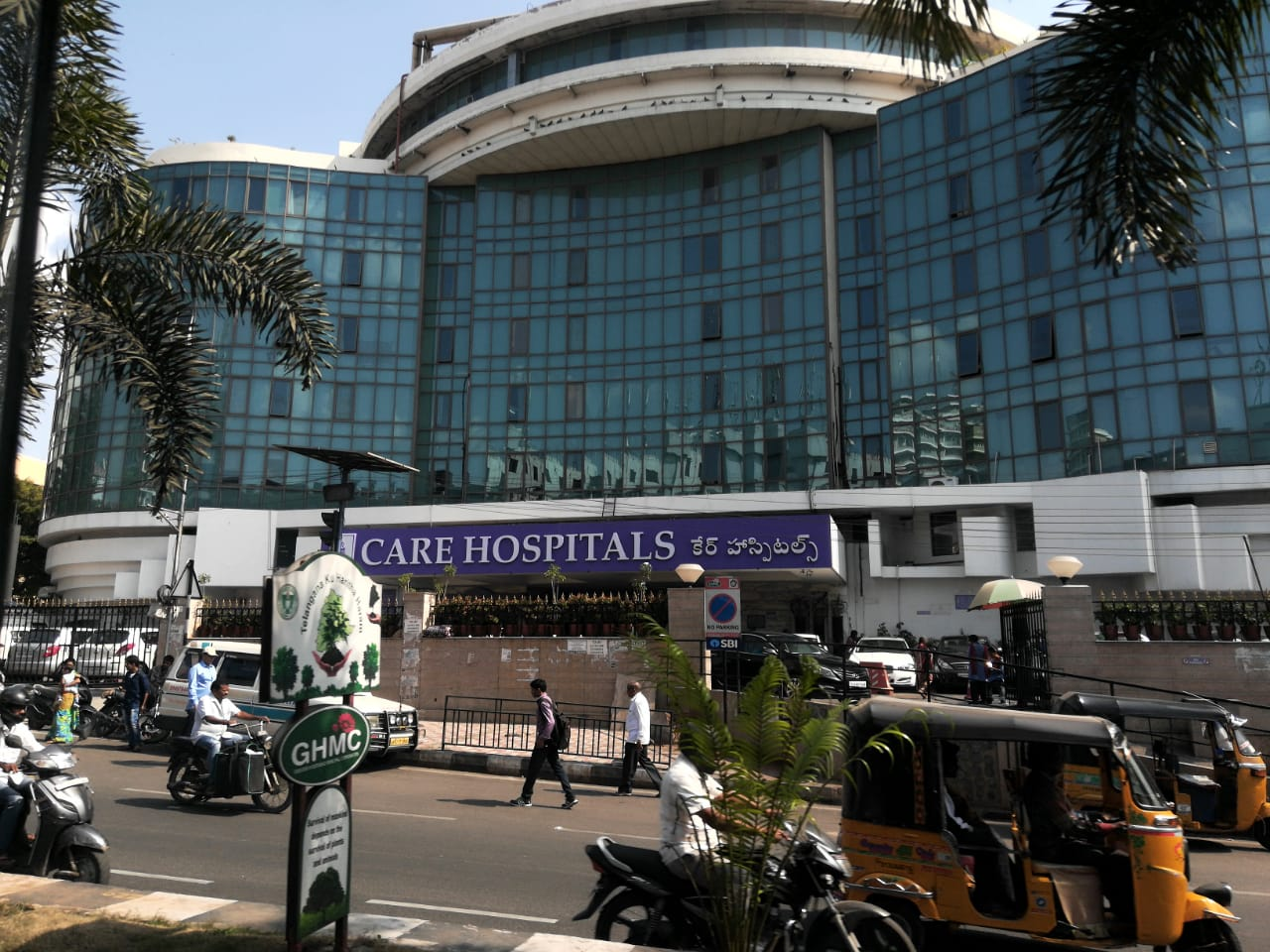
Care Hospital, Banjara hills

== Leadership ==
CARE hospital's leadership includes Dr. Pawan Kumar, CEO.

== Departments ==
CARE Hospitals comprises the following departments:

- Anesthesia
- Arthroscopy & Sports Medicine
- Bone Marrow Transplant
- Cardiology
- Colonoscopys
- Critical Care Medicine
- Dermatology, cosmetic & plastic surgery
- Dietetics & Nutrition
- Ear, nose, and throat (ENT)
- Emergency Medicine
- Gastroenterology
- General Surgery
- Gynecology & Obstetrics
- Kidney Transplantation
- Liver Transplantation
- Neonatology
- Nephrology
- Neurology
- Oncology
- Orthopedics
- Pediatrics
- Physiotherapy & Rehabilitation
- Plastic Surgery
- Pulmonology
- Urology
