= Koppole =

- neighborhood
- Interactive map of Koppole
- Location in India
- Coordinates: 15.2914°N 80.0510°E
- Country: India

Population
  - Total: 4,000

Languages
- Time zone: UTC+5:30 (IST)
- PIN: 523286
- Telephone code: 08592

Koppole is a neighborhood of Ongole city. It is in Prakasam district in the state of Andhra Pradesh, India.

== History ==
The town's history dates from 230 BCE with the era of the Mauryas and Sathavahanas who ruled most of what is now present-day Andhra Pradesh. A few inscriptions dating to the Satavahana period have been found in the village China Ganjam, near Ongole. After the Satavahanas, this place came into the limelight
