= Deccan Archaeological and Cultural Research Institute =

Non-profit organisation operating in the Deccan region of India

- Abbreviation: DACRI
- Formation: 5 November 2009; 16 years ago
- Type: NGO
- Purpose: Art, cultural, architectural heritage preservation/restoration
- Headquarters: Shalivahana Nagar, Hyderabad-36
- Director: Kurra Jitendra Babu
- Website: https://dacri.in/

The Deccan Archaeological and Cultural Research Institute is a non-profit organisation operating in the Deccan region of India, registered under Act 2 of The Indian Trusts Act, 1882. It is dedicated to the conservation and preservation of India’s natural, cultural, living, tangible and intangible heritage.

== History ==
DACRI was founded in 2009 in Hyderabad to promote historical and cultural research among the people of the Deccae. Since 2009, it has pioneered the conservation, protection and promotion of the cultural heritage and monumental grandeur of Deccan region.

In 2012, members of Deccan Archaeological and Cultural Research Institute (DACRI) and other archeologists and historians discovered a series of 20 megalithic burial cairn circles dating to 1000 BCE on a hillock in Madugala village in Mahbubnagar district, India. The team also discovered a huge Satavahana site in an extent of 100 acres datable to between the 1st century BCE to 2nd Century CE.

== Publications ==
- Telaṅgāṇālō inumu, ukku pariśrama (in Telugu) by S Jaikishan; Deccan Archaeological and Cultural Research Institute, 2010
- Siddhanāgārjununi Rasēndramaṅgaḷaṃ (in Telugu) by Nāgārjuna, Siddha.; Kurrā Jitēndrabābu; Deccan Archaeological and Cultural Research Institute, 2010.
- Tragedy of Hyderabad (in English) by Mir Laik Ali; Kurrā Jitēndrabābu; Deccan Archaeological and Cultural Research Institute, 2011.
- Kaumudīmahotsavaḥ (in Sanskrit) Vijjikā; Mānavalli Rāmakr̥ṣṇakavi; S K Ramanatha Sastri; Deccan Archaeological and Cultural Research Institute, 2015.
