= Temples of Hyderabad =

The following are the temples located in and around Hyderabad, Telangana, India .

== Sita Rambagh temple ==
The temple, with Sri Sita Rama Chandraswamy as main deity, was constructed in 1933.

== Birla Mandir ==
Birla Mandir is a Hindu temple, built on a 280 feet (85 m) high hillock called Naubath Pahad on a 13 acres (53,000 m2) plot. It was constructed in 1976.

== Hare Krishna Golden Temple ==
Hare Krishna Golden Temple, located in Banjara Hills, Hyderabad, is regarded by local tradition as a sacred site where the deity is believed to have self-manifested (swayambhu) over 7,000 years ago, making it one of the oldest temples in Hyderabad. The presiding deity, Swayambhu Sri Lakshmi Narasimha Swamy, is enshrined along with a rare Shaligram Shila in the Garbhalayam. This sacred Saligrama Shila was discovered in the Gandaki River near the Muktinath Temple in Nepal. The temple continues to attract devotees who revere its ancient origins and spiritual significance.

== Jagannath Temple ==
The Jagannath Temple in Hyderabad is a temple dedicated to the Hindu god Jagannath. It is situated at Banjara hills Road no.12.

=== Features ===
There are shrines dedicated to Lakshmi, with Shiva, Ganesh, Hanuman and Navagrahas. The sanctum sanctorum houses Jagannath along with his siblings, Balabhadra and Subhadra.

== Shyam Temple ==
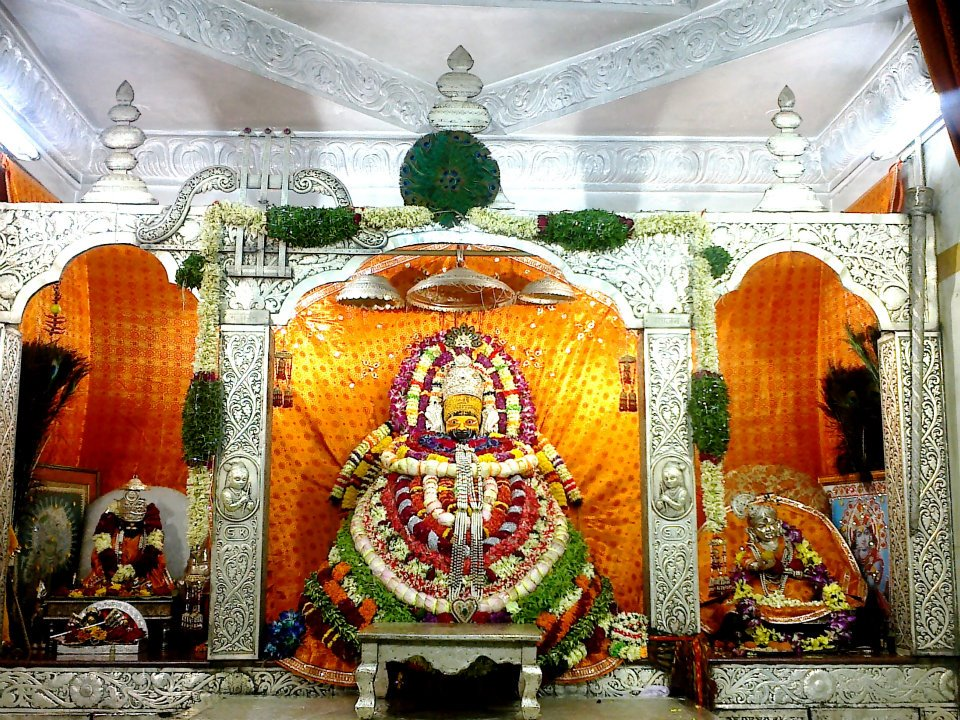
Shyam Temple

Located in Kacheguda, the main deity at this temple is Barbarika.

== Sri Uma Rama Lingeshwara Swamy Temple, KPHB 6th Phase, Hyderabad ==
Located in KPHB 6th Phase, this temple is of Shiva, kanaka durga.

== Chilkur Balaji Temple ==

Located at Chilkur in Moinabad mandal, this temple is around 23 km from Mehdipatnam locality. This temple of Lord Venkateshwara is popularly called "Visa Balaji".

== Chennakeshava Swamy Temple ==
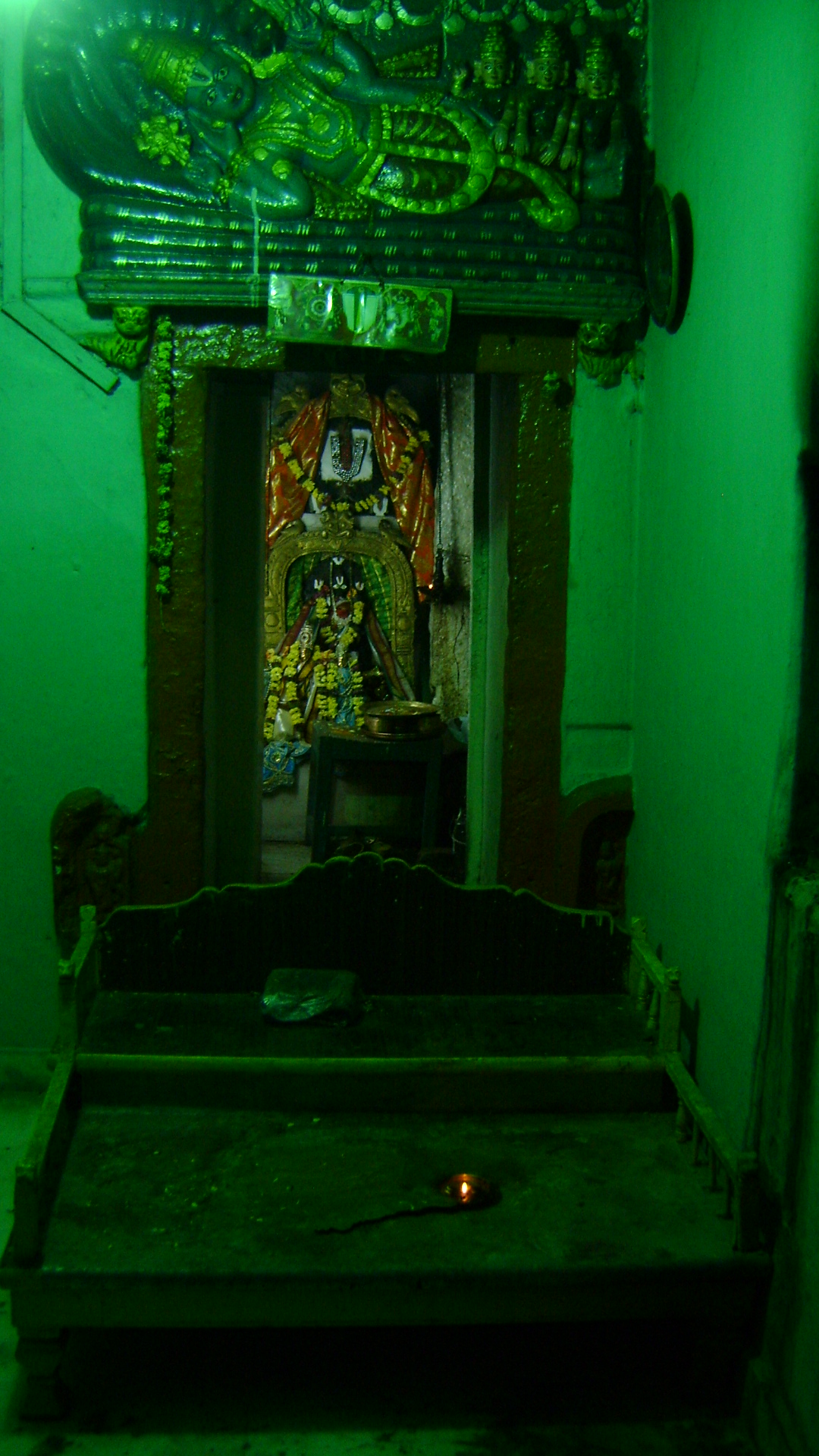
Main deity at Chennakeshava Swamy temple at Keshavagiri

This temple is located on a hillock in Keshavagiri neighbourhood of Chandrayangutta area.

== Karmanghat Hanuman Temple ==
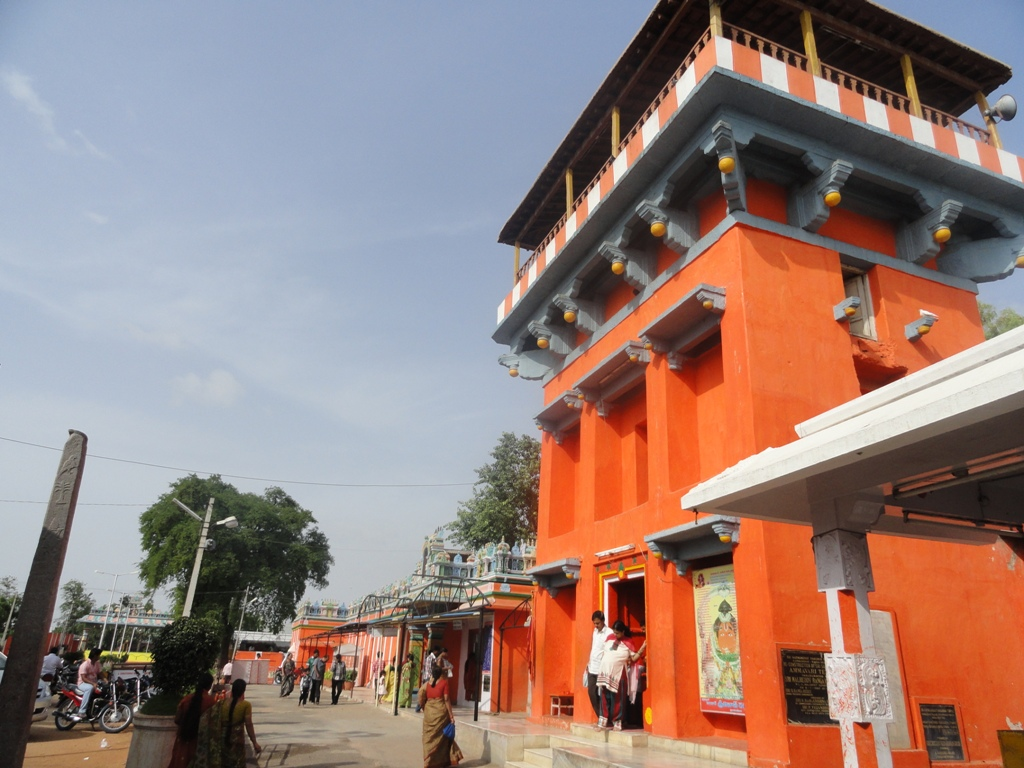
Karmanghat Hanuman Temple

The temple was built by the Kakatiya king Prataprudra II in 1143.

== Kesari hanuman Temple ==
It is located at Jiyaguda, on the banks of River Musi.

== Parsi Fire Temple ==
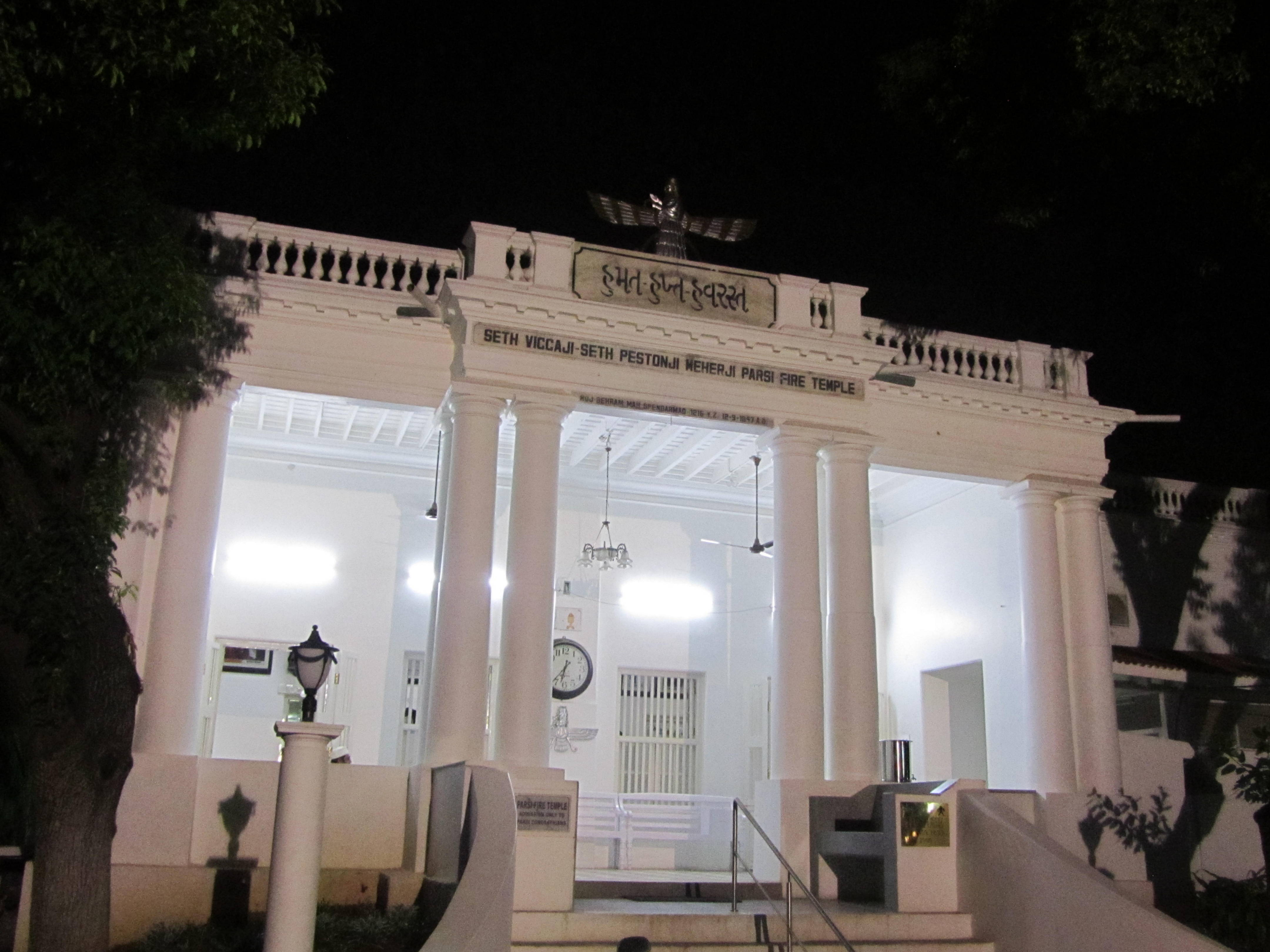
Parsi Fire Temple

It is a Parsi Fire temple located at M.G. Road in Secunderabad.

== Peddamma Temple ==
This temple is located on Road no.55 of Jubilee Hills.

== Ranganatha Swami Temple ==
This temple, around 400 years old, is located in Jijyaguda.

== Sri Subrahmanya Swamy Devalayam, Skandagiri ==
Located in Padma Rao Nagar neighbourhood of the city, this temple is also called "Skandagiri Temple", and is about 2 km from Secunderabad Railway Station.

== Akkanna Madanna Temple ==
This temple is located in Shalibanda.

== Ujjaini Mahankali Temple ==
Sri Ujjaini Mahakali Temple is a Hindu temple located in Secunderabad.

== Sanghi Temple ==
This temple is located near Ramoji Film City. It is dedicated to Lord Venkateswara, and is on a promontory overlooking Sanghi Nagar.

== Ashtalakshmi Temple, Hyderabad ==
This temple in Vasavi Colony is dedicated to the Hindu goddess Lakshmi as Ashtalakshmi. It was built in 1996.

== Katta Maisamma temple ==
This temple is located in Begumpet, beside Hyderabad Public School.

== Balkampet Yellamma temple ==
This temple is located in Balkampet and is dedicated to Yellamma, a traditional manifestation of the Hindu goddess Parvati or Shakti.

== Sri Ranganatha Temple ==
It is situated in Gandhichervu, Hayathnagar, Hyderabad.

== Lakshmi Ganapathi Temple ==
This Lakshmi Ganapathi Temple in Ameerpet, is situated opposite Big Bazaar Lane.

== Math \ Ashram ==
=== Sri Sadguru Samarth Narayan Ashram ===
This ashram is located in Jiyaguda near Purana Pul.

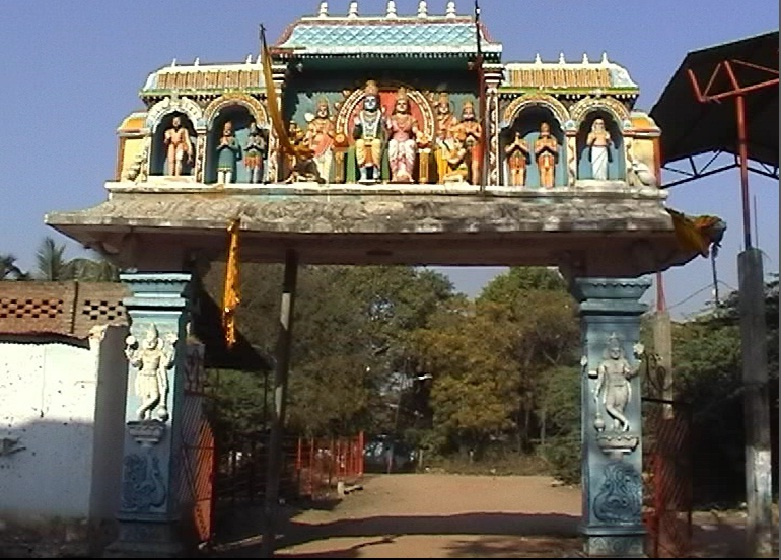

=== Ahobilam Math ===
This Math is located in D.D.Colony, near Shivam Road.

=== International Society for Krishna Consciousness ===
There are three ISKCON temples in the city - Hare Krishna Land, at Nampally Station Road, Abids; that Secunderabad, near Secunderabad Railway Station; and at Banjara Hills near Shri Jagannatha Temple.

=== Sringeri Shankara Math ===
The Sringeri Shankar Math established in Nallakunta is the oldest of the branch maths in Hyderabad.

=== Satya Sai Temple ===
This temple is located on Shivam road, near Osmania university.

=== Rama Krishna Math ===
Located at Domalaguda, Lower Tank Bund road.

== Other Temples ==
Hyderabad Kalibari was established in 1974.

== Shiva Hanuman Temple at Baghlingampally ==
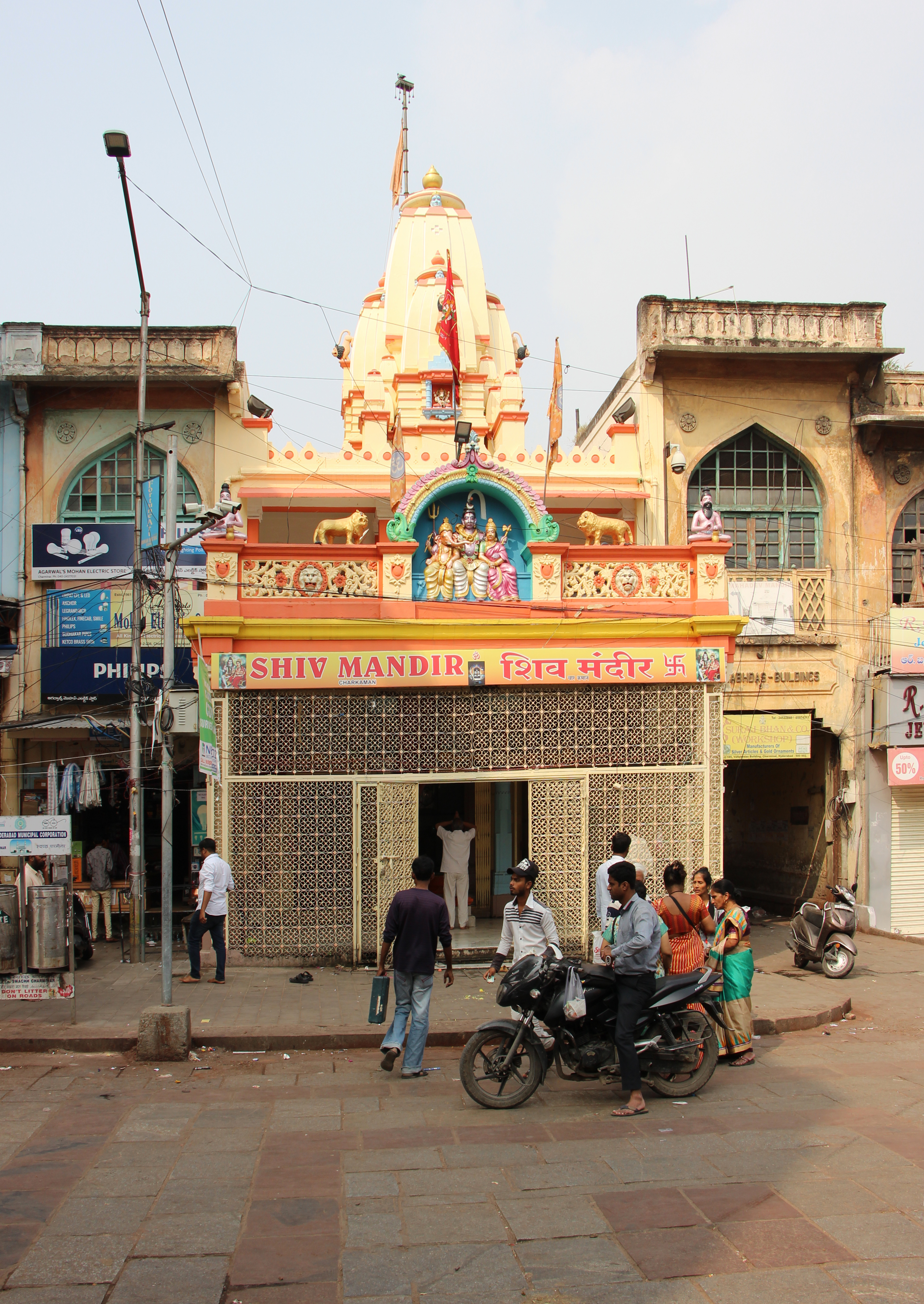
Charkaman Shiva Temple

Shiva Hanuman Temple is in Baghlingampally of Hyderabad.

== Akashpuri Hanuman Temple at Dhoolpet ==
Akashpuri Hanuman Temple, in Dhoolpet area, was built over a period of nine years and is one of the largest idols at 50 feet high. The temple sits on the 150-foot hill at Akashpuri in Hyderabad.

== Marakatha Sri Lakshmi Ganapathi Devalayam at Kanajiguda ==
Marakatha Sri Lakshmi Ganapathi Devalayam is at Sai Nagar Colony, Kanajiguda, Secunderabad.

== Sai Baba Temple, Dilsukhnagar ==
Sai Baba Temple is a Hindu temple of Sai Baba located in Dilsukhnagar, Hyderabad, India.

== Daiva Sannidhanam, Film Nagar ==
This temple is located at Road 38, Jubilee Hills, near Film chamber, Film Nagar, Hyderabad.

== Jagannath Temple Bollaram ==
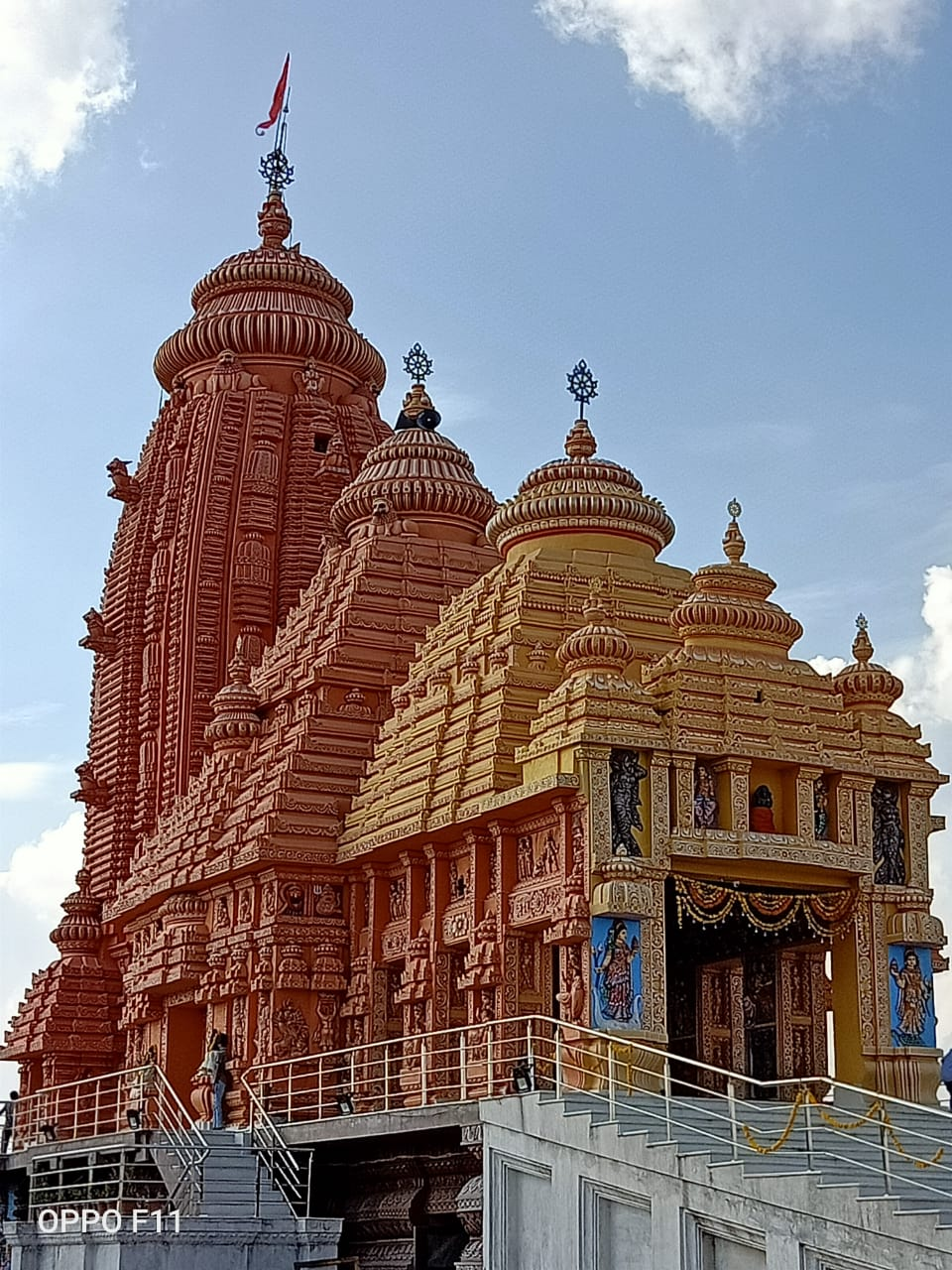

The Shree Jagannath Temple of IDA Bollaram is a Hindu temple dedicated to Jagannath, a form of Vishnu near exit-4 of outer ring road (ORR) in the city of Hyderabad.

== Saraswati Temple, Wargal ==
Saraswati Temple, Wargal is located in Warangal, at a distance of 53 Kms from Hyderabad's Mahatma Gandhi Bus Station.
