= Government Nizamia General Hospital =

Government Nizamia General Hospital (حکومت نظامیہ جنرل ہسپتال ( طبی داواکہان
- Government of Telangana
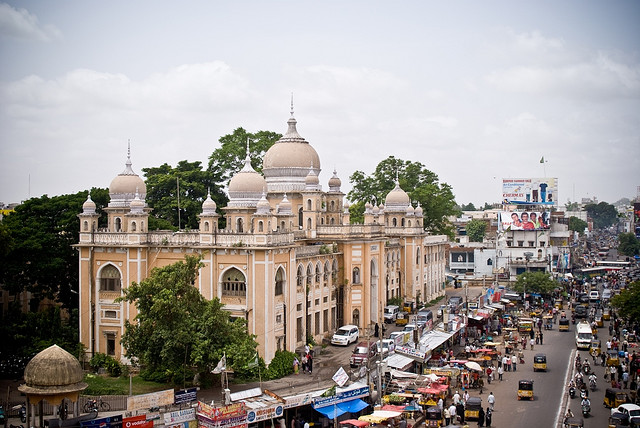

Geography
- Location: Charminar, Hyderabad, Telangana, India, 500002
- Coordinates: 17.3605319°N 78.4750474°E

Services
- Emergency department: No
- Beds: 180

History
- Opened: 1938; 87 years ago

Government Nizamia General Hospital, popularly known as Government Unani Hospital, is a public hospital located in Hyderabad, Telangana, India. It is a hospital for general and Unani medicine. It was established during the reign of Nizams. It is located near the historic building of Charminar.

== History ==
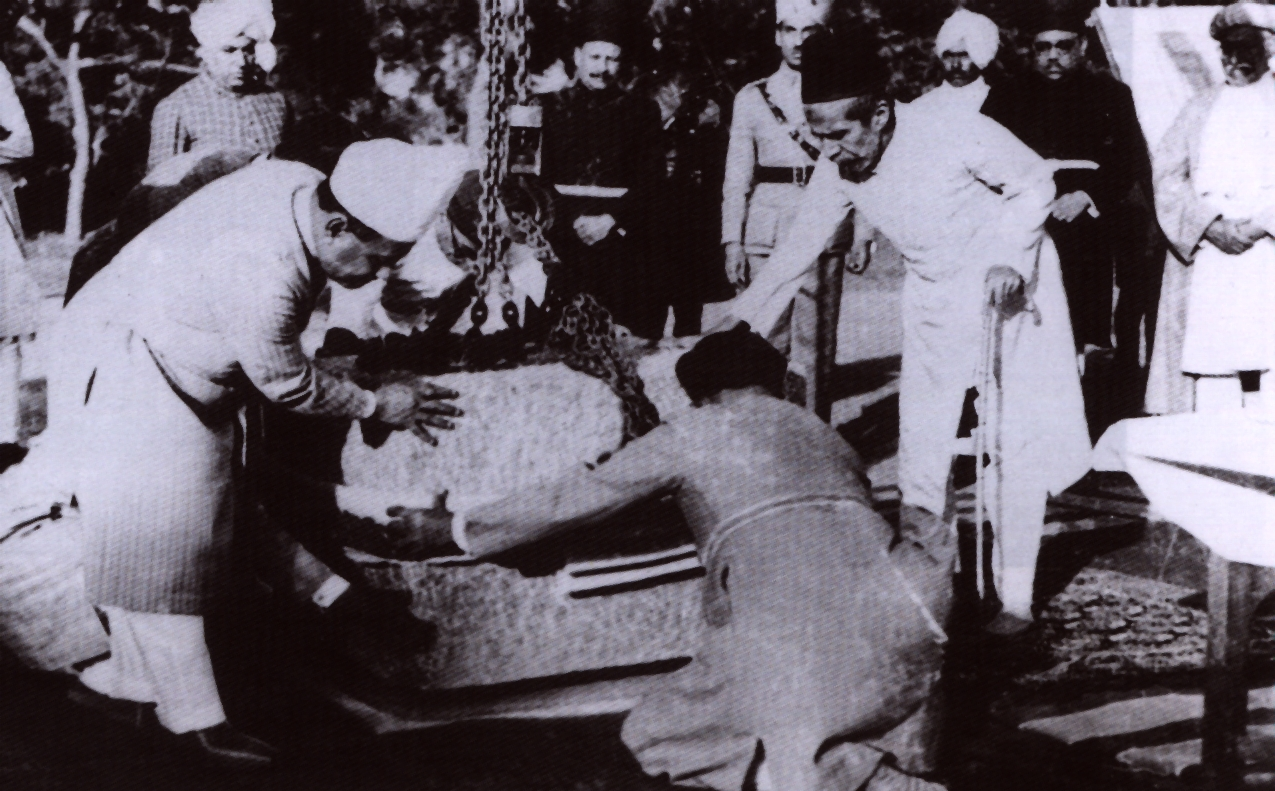
Laying of the foundation stone of the Unani Hospital. Standing: The Nizam Asaf Jah VII (left), Finance Minister Akbar Hydari (right)

Nizamia General Hospital was built in 1345 Hijri, which is Gregorian 1926, by the last Nizam of Hyderabad - HEH Mir Osman Ali Khan.

== Hospital ==
The departments at the hospital include Gynaecology, Surgery, Dentistry, Ophthalmology and Pathology. It provides Unani medicine services in Bell's palsy, functional neurological disorders, viral Hepatitis renal calculi, nephritis, pyelonephritis, diabetes, diabetic ulcers, sinusitis, bronchial asthma, obesity, haemorrhoid, Fistula-in-ano, chronic non-specific ulcers, skin diseases, sexual problems and diseases belongs to genealogical disorders.

A medical college, Government Nizamia Tibbi College is located on the campus.

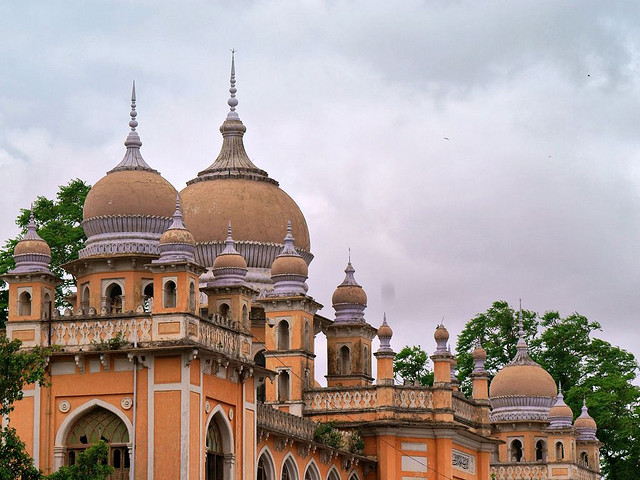
Government Nizamia General Hospital

== See also ==
- Government Nizamia Tibbi College
- Healthcare in India
- List of hospitals in India
