= Undavalli Caves =

Rock-cut cave temples in India

Coordinates: 16.49687°N 80.58178°E

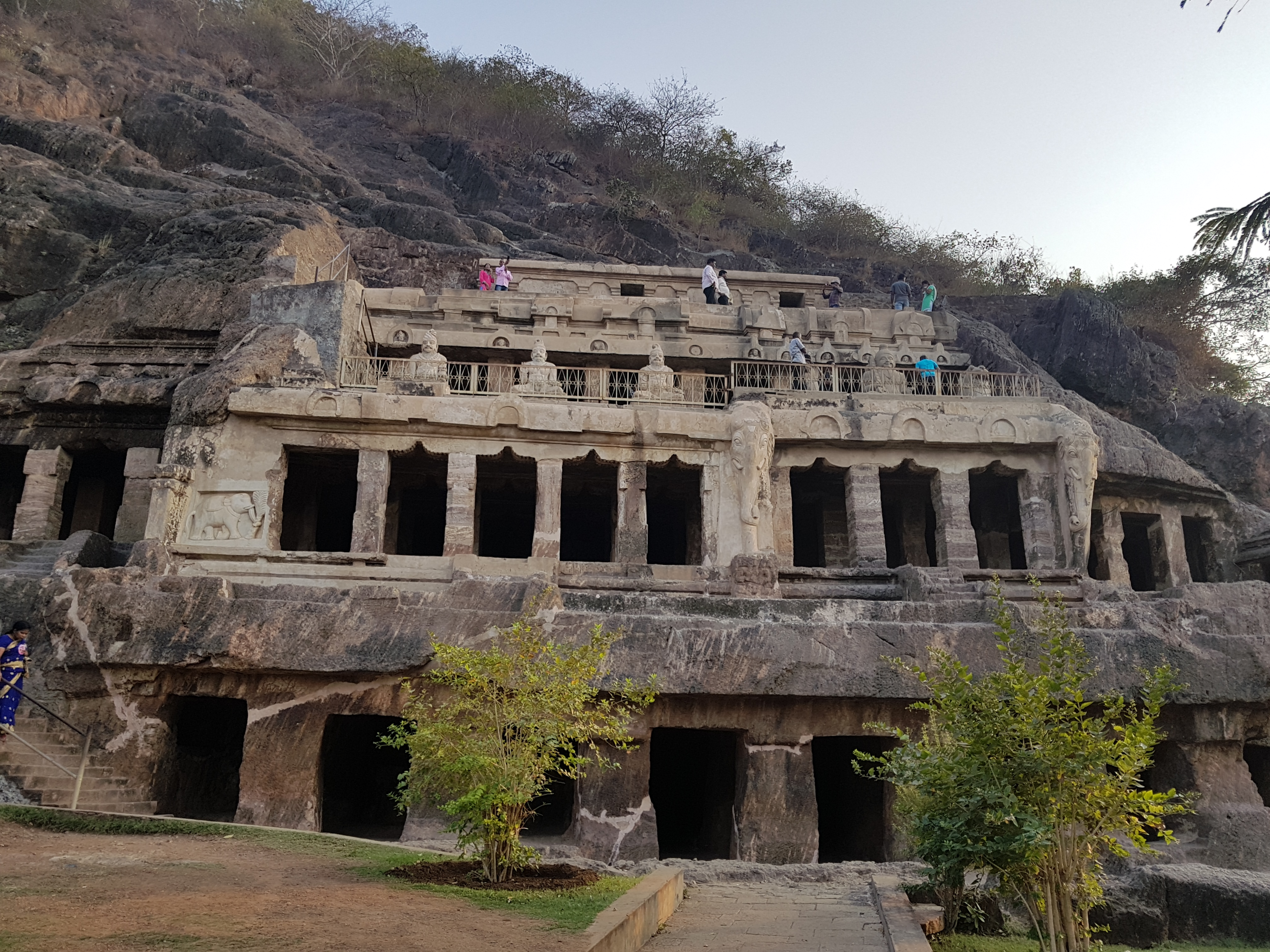
- Undavalli Caves
- Location of Undavalli caves
- Location: Vijayawada, Guntur district, Andhra Pradesh, India
- Discovery: 420 - 620 CE

The Undavalli Caves are monolithic Indian rock-cut architecture, located in Guntur district in the Indian state of Andhra Pradesh. The caves are located south west of Vijayawada. They were carved out of solid sandstone hills in the 4th–5th centuries CE, primarily during the Vishnukundina dynasty era. It is one of the centrally protected Monuments of National Importance.

== Chronology ==
These caves were carved out of solid sandstone on a hillside in the 4th to 5th centuries CE. There are several caves and the best known largest one has three stories with a huge recreated statue of Vishnu in a reclining posture, sculpted from a single block of granite inside the second floor. It is estimated that these caves were sculpted sometime in 4-5th century CE during the reign of Vishnukundina kings The main cave is one of the earliest examples of Gupta architecture, primarily primitive rock-cut monastery cells carved into the sandstone hills. Initially, the caves were shaped as a Jain abode and the first-floor abode still retains the Jain style; the vihara exhibits Jain monastics and includes tirthankara sculptures. This first level of the cave is a carved vihara and includes Buddhist artwork. The site served as the Bhikkhu monastic complex during ancient period. The walls of the caves display sculptures carved by skilled craftsmen.

The caves are surrounded by green countryside. From the high hill above the cave overlooking the Krishna River many fine specimens of rock-cut architecture can be seen. These caves are part of Mangalagiri Tadepalle Municipal Corporation.

== Architecture ==
It is an Impressive Four storey rock cut temple with East facing facade of 29m long, 16m wide. There are variation in depth of each floor. The ground floor is an unfinished low pillared hall with 8 pillars and 7 door openings on façade. The first storey accommodates triple shrine at back, each with the pillared hall in front, originally dedicated to the Trinity (Shiva, Vishnu, and Brahma).

Sculptures on the walls represent Vaishnava deities. The second storey has a pillared rectangular shrine of Vishnu on a serpent. Sculptures of Shiva and Vaishnava and a few like the Vaishnava Alwars are sculptured later on. The top floor was unfinished with a Triple Shrine. Some of the sculptural specimens are attributed to Chalukyan period. It has 5 meter long statue of Vishnu in reclining position.

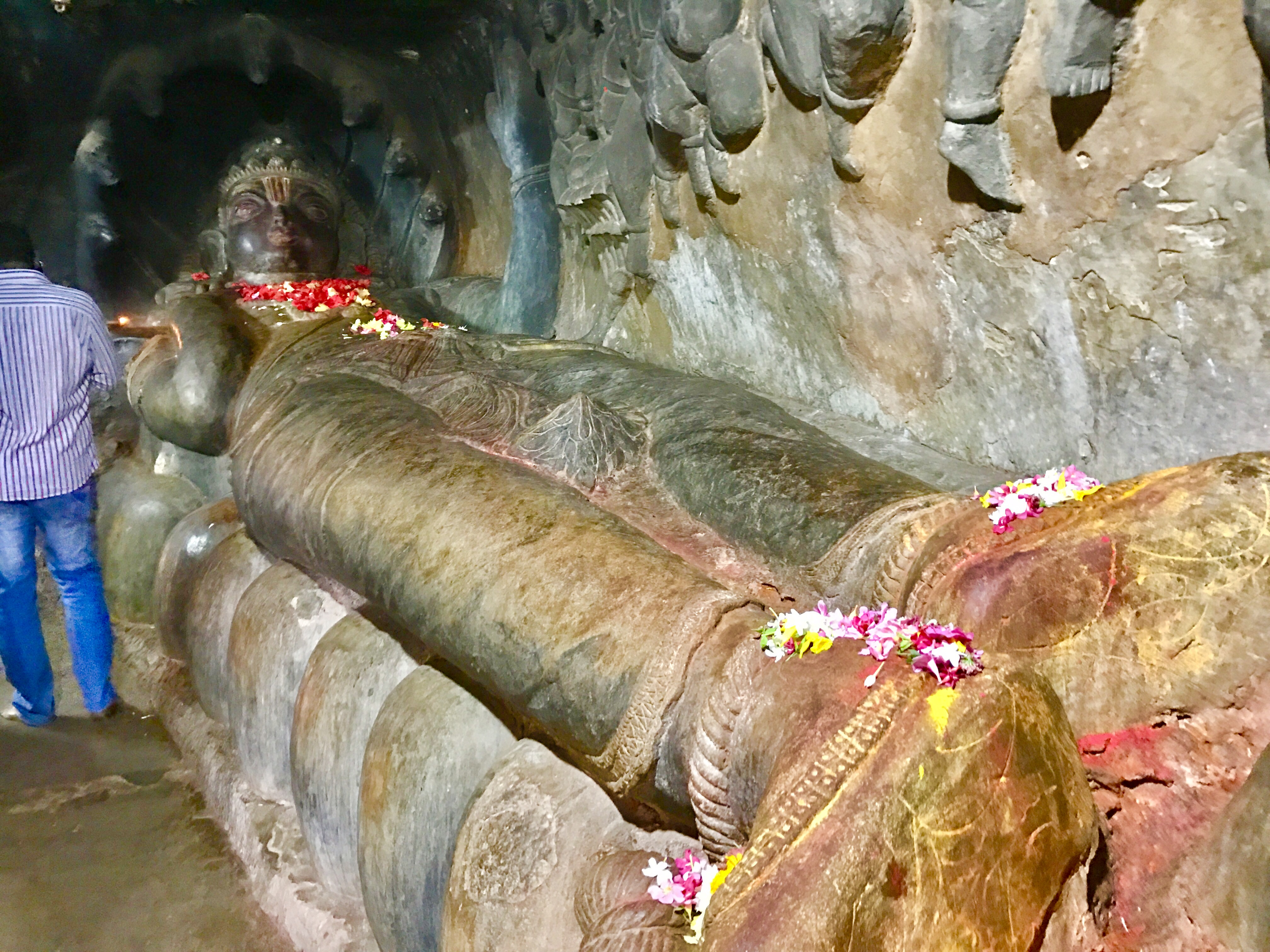
Reclining Vishnu at Undavalli.

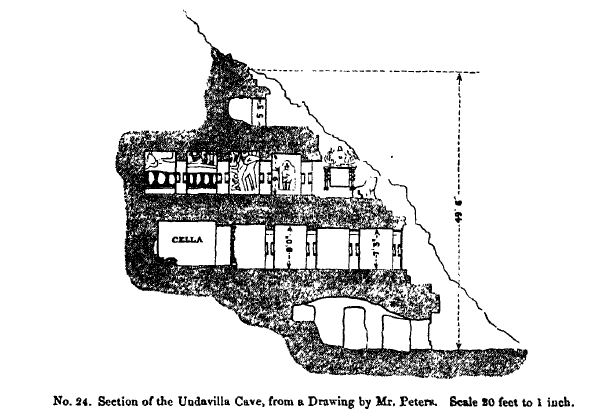
Section of Undavalli Caves.

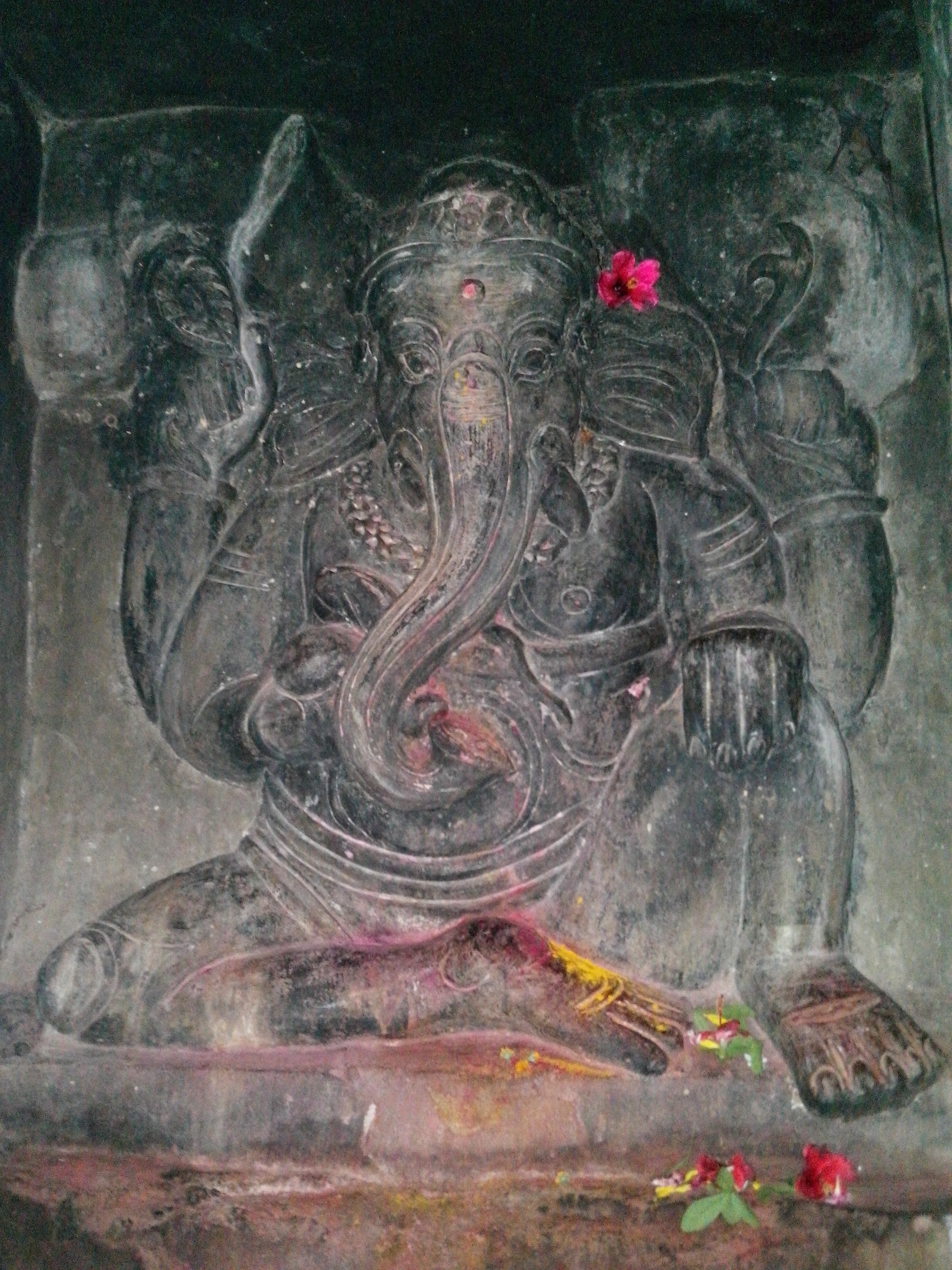
Ganesha in the Undavalli Caves.

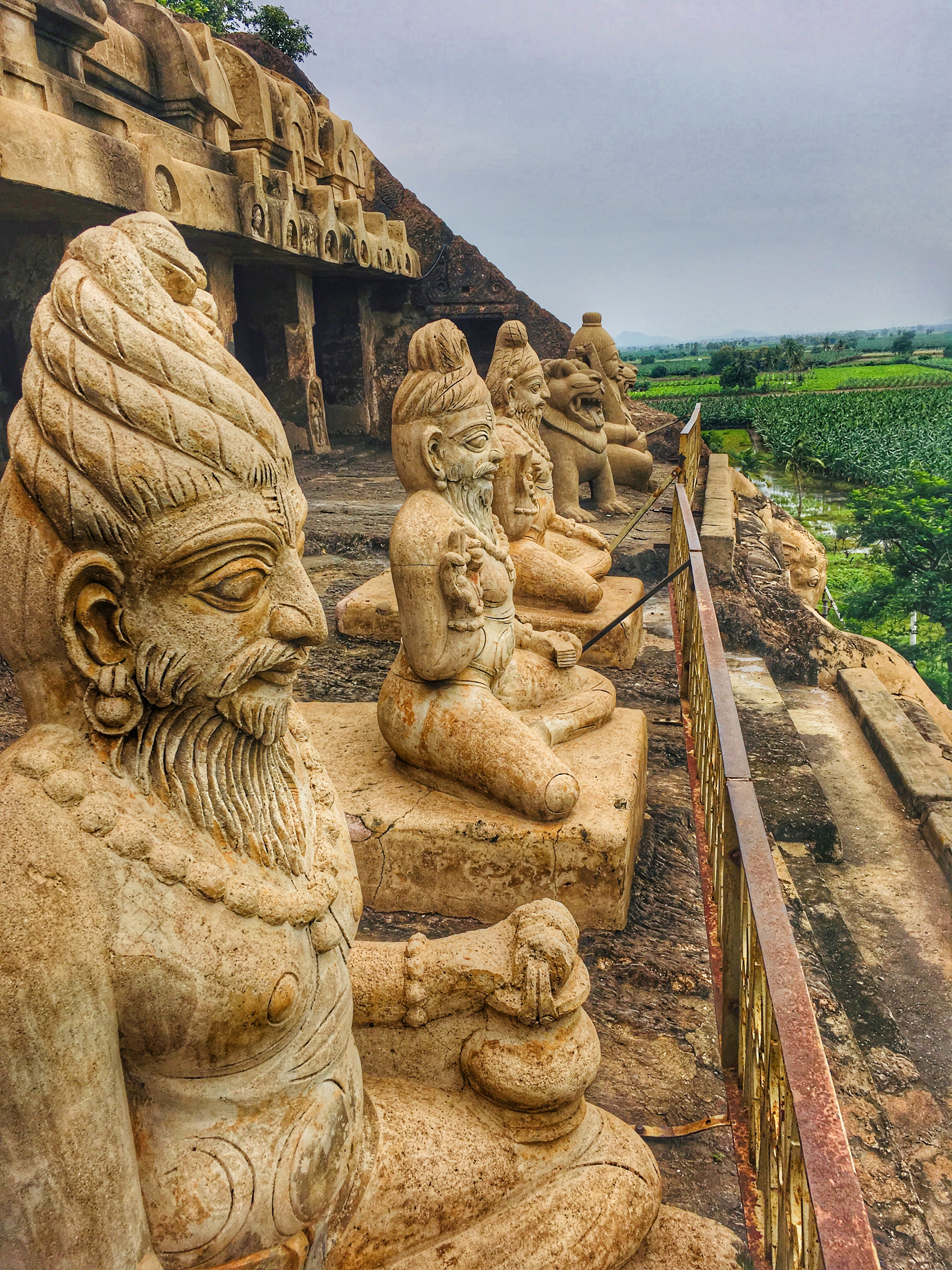
Sculptures of rishis at Undavalli Caves.

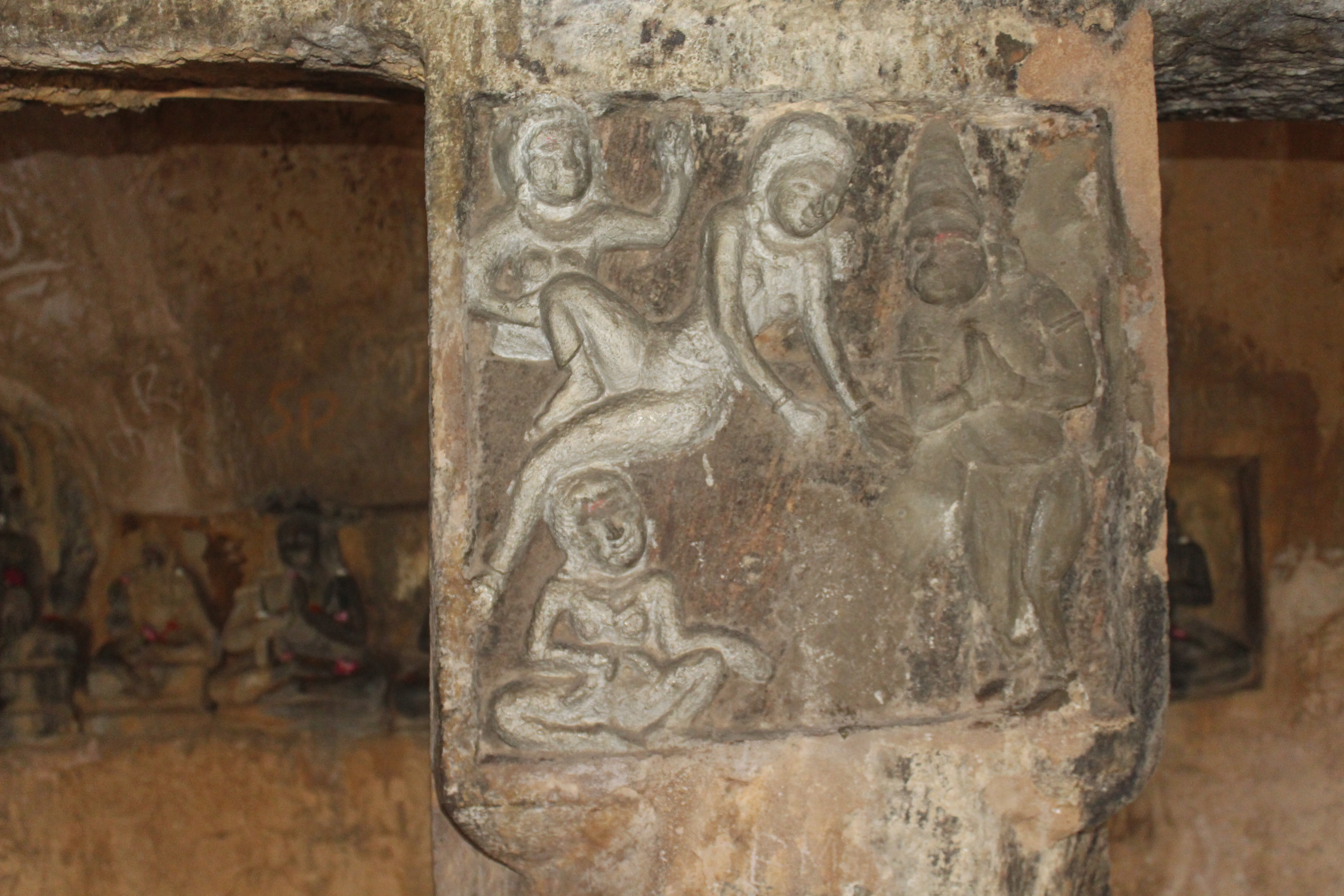
Hanuman depicted on a pillar at Undavalli Caves.

== Transport ==
The only means of connectivity for the caves is by road. APSRTC operates bus services from Vijayawada, Guntur and Amaravathi to this location. APCRDA runs Tourist Bus-cum-Boat services through Krishna River from Prakasam Barrage.

== See also ==
- Akkanna Madanna Caves
- Mogalrajapuram Caves
