= Mogalrajapuram Caves =

7th-century rock-cut cave temples in Vijayawada

Moghalrajpuram Caves
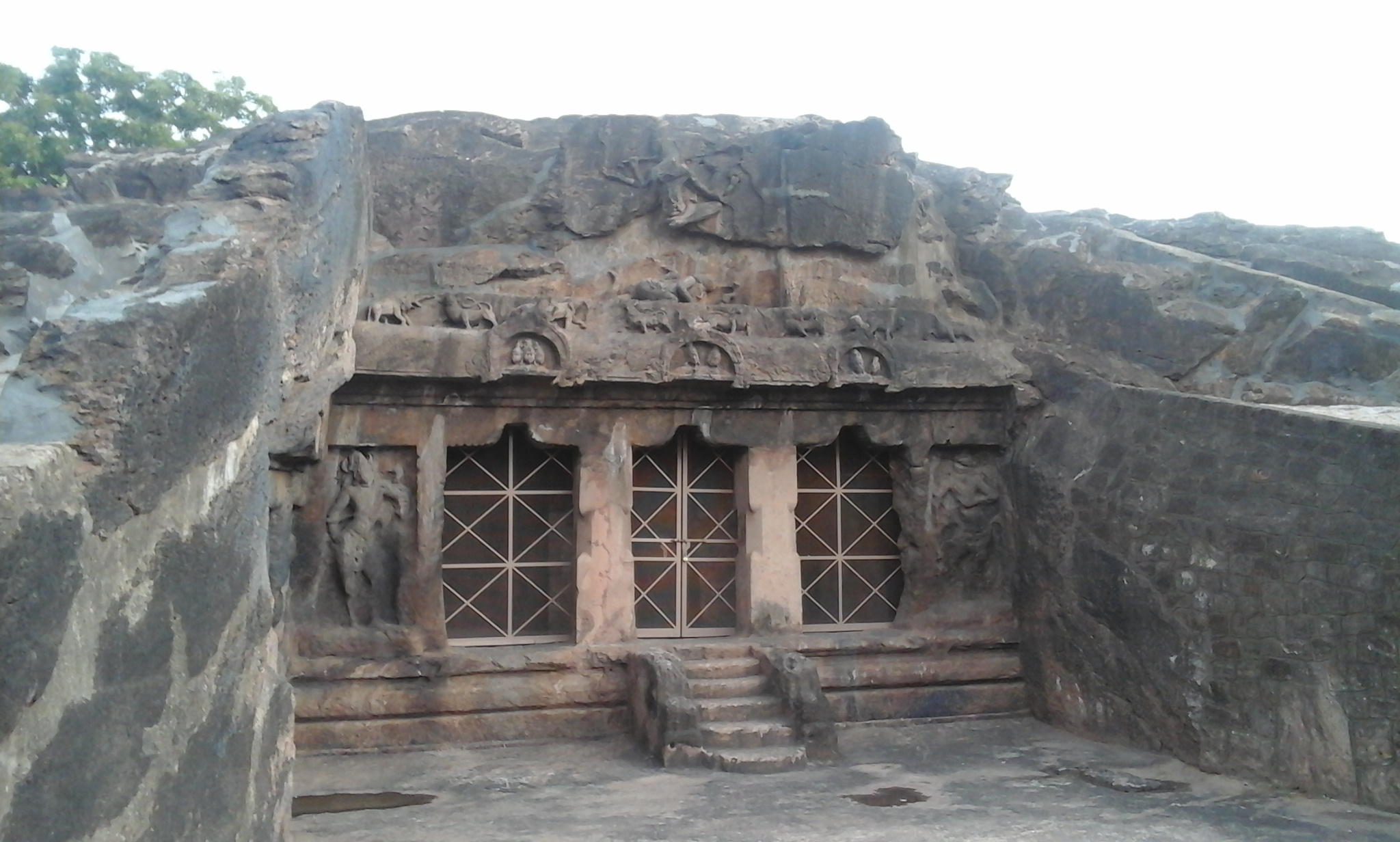

- Location within India Location within Andhra Pradesh

Religion
- Affiliation: Hinduism
- District: NTR district
- Deity: Hindu, various

Location
- Location: Vijayawada
- State: Andhra Pradesh
- Country: India
- Interactive map of Moghalrajpuram Caves
- Coordinates: 16°30′22″N 80°38′49″E

Architecture
- Creator: Early Eastern Chalukya dynasty
- Completed: c. 650–700 CE

The Mogalrajapuram Caves are five rock-cut cave temple groups located in different parts of Vijayawada, Andhra Pradesh, India. Dedicated to Shiva, they were excavated during the Eastern Chalukya reign or the Vishnukundins reign. They are generally dated to about the 7th century, after the Akkanna Madanna Caves. They are simple and small, yet the artwork and iconography is more sophisticated than Akkanna Madanna Caves. These include Nataraja, Ganesh and Ardhanarisvara. They are generally numbered as Cave I through V, with Mogalrajapuram Cave II being the most architecturally and iconographically evolved of the five.

It is a centrally protected monument of national importance and managed by Archaeological Survey of India.

== Location ==
The Mogalrajapuram Caves are located about 5 kilometres (3 mi) to the east of Akkanna Madanna caves and the major Kanaka Durga temple. The five cave temples are in different rocky sites of Vijayawada, Andhra Pradesh. They are to the north and some distance away from the left bank of the Krishna river. The original names of the caves or the cave temples is unknown. They began to be called after the village east of "Bezwada" (Vijayawada) where they were re-discovered by the 19th-century archaeologists in the 19th century. The locale itself was renamed between the late 17th and early 18th century apparently after the Golconda Sultanate was dismissed by Aurangzeb of the Mughal empire.

Cave III, IV and V are excavated from the same rocky hill, with Cave III and IV close to each other on the south side of the hill. Cave V is on the northern side of the same hill. Cave II is about 500 meter from this group, and Cave I is about 150 meters west from Cave II.

== Date ==
The Mogalrajapuram Cave temples, particularly the more complex Cave II, has led to two theories of when these were excavated. Given the simplicity of Caves I, II–V and the iconography, some scholars place them in the 6th-century and credit the Vishnukundins dynasty. Other scholars consider Cave II, note the similarities with the simpler caves here, and place all of them in the second half of the 7th century, crediting them to the Eastern Chalukya dynasty.

== Description ==
The Mogalrajapuram consist of five excavations. Some of them look similar at a glance, but differ in the architectural elements and details.

Cave I

The Cave I has a simple facade with two pillars and two pilasters. Between these, above each bay, the facade has a notch. The pillars are square, surmounted by an uttira with bhuta-gana decoration. The kapota exterior merges into the ceiling. The interior is more sophisticated, and of a square plan. It consists of three mandapas – mukha-mandapa (entrance hall), maha-mandapa (main gathering hall) and ardha-mandapa (devotional hall). Each mandapa has its own vajana frame, with ganas and hamsa malavahakas motifs. The single sanctum is on a faux-jagati carved from the rock. In front are profiles of two Shaiva dvarapalas, deliberately mutilated and gouged out. Their elegant kati-vastras can be traced, suggestive of the clothing popular around the 7th century. Their profile is similar to those found in Pallava and Pandyan rock-cut monuments.

Cave II

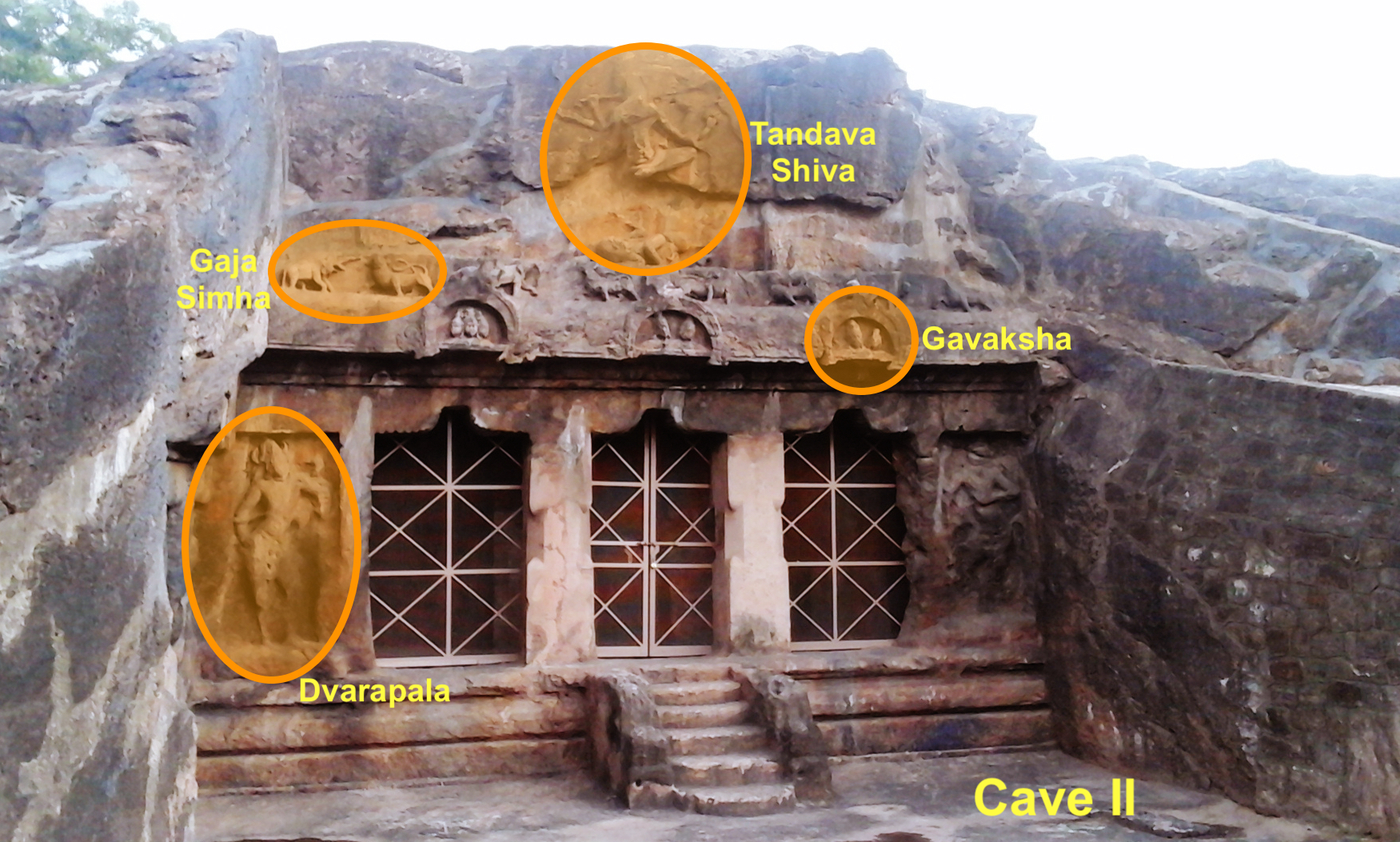
Mogalrajapuram Cave II outer artwork

The Cave II is in the south side of the Shivalayam hill in Vijayawada, and is the most evolved of five Mogalrajapuram caves. It has a more elaborate front court that was created by cutting out about 9 meters of rock. The facade consists of two pillars and two pilasters. Inside is a rectangular mandapa supported by four pillars and two pilasters. The mandapa leads to three sanctums.

The front is flanked by two dvarapalas (damaged). They are in tribhanga-pose, both equipped with Shaiva motifs. Between them are two pillars, square at their ends and octagonal between. Three gavaskas decorate the top of the facade. The nasika kudus, vyalamukhas and sakti-dvaja artwork can readily traced. The entablatures here include playful elephants, lions, bulls and mythical fused animals. Inside the damaged stambha torana, at the top of the rock face is a Tandava Shiva (dancing Shiva). It is damaged, but three items can be identified – the damaru, the parasu and the trisula. A notable aspect of this dancing Shiva and Naga (snake) is that it reflects the Odisha-tradition; it was likely carved by a shilpin from Odisha. This iconic style of Nataraja becomes a standard relief on the sukanasi or the ceiling in the Eastern Chalukyan temples of later times.

The facade pillars are notable for their upper shadurams with 7th-century Vaishnava artwork. In particular, one shows Krishna with Putana legend, another showing Krishna with Kuvalayapida elephant legend, while a third shown Kaliya-damana legend of Krishna. Thus, like other parts of India, Chalukyan artists were reverentially including Shaiva and Vaishnava themes within the same temple before the 7th century. The steps between the pillars lead into the mandapa inside. It is small, yet suffices for few families of devotees inside the temple. The three sanctums are dedicated to the Hindu trinity – Brahma, Shiva and Vishnu. The central sanctum is provided with a circular monolithic linga-pitha. The statues of Brahma and Vishnu are missing.

On the western wall is a niche, likely a secondary shrine for an unknown deity. This is now empty. Outside, however, near one of the dvarapala is a niche where the profile of a valampuri Ganesha can be traced. He has a broken tusk in one of his hands and of course, a bowl of sweet modaka in another.

Cave III and IV

Cave III and IV are small, one sanctum shrines. They are close to each other, on the southern side of the same rocky hill. Both have a facade with two pillars flanked by two pilasters, and a square sanctum. Cave III is larger of the two, with auxiliary shrines to the main rock-cut temple. Cave III is notable for the traces of Durga Mahisasuramardini bas-relief in the sanctum, though it is gouged out and damaged. Cave IV, in contrast, has a square pitha for a Shiva linga (lost), as well as with niches with padma-pitha of a four-armed Vishnu to the north and a four-armed Brahma to the south.

Cave V

Cave V is on the north side of the same hill that contains Cave III and IV. Cave V is unfinished, three shrines excavation. It is about 26.5 feet by 5.5 feet in size, with three square sanctums of 7.5 feet side each (they are almost a cube). The mandapa pillars are square in their cross section and plain. The pilasters have a series of animal friezes. Eight of these can be traced, the rest have been gouged out. The floor of this cave is restored with a thin layer of plaster poured in modern times.

== Gallery ==
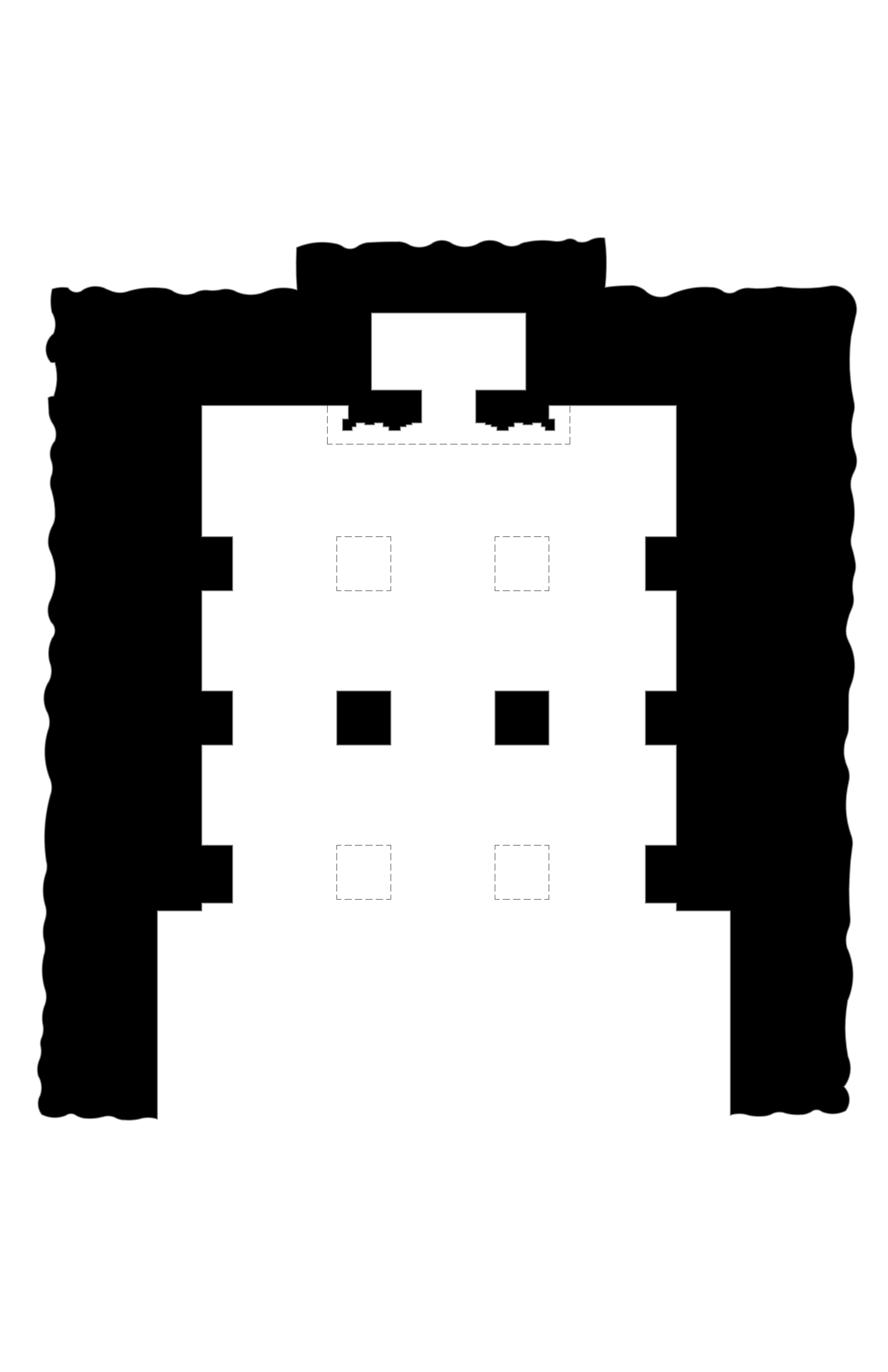
Floor plan of Cave I

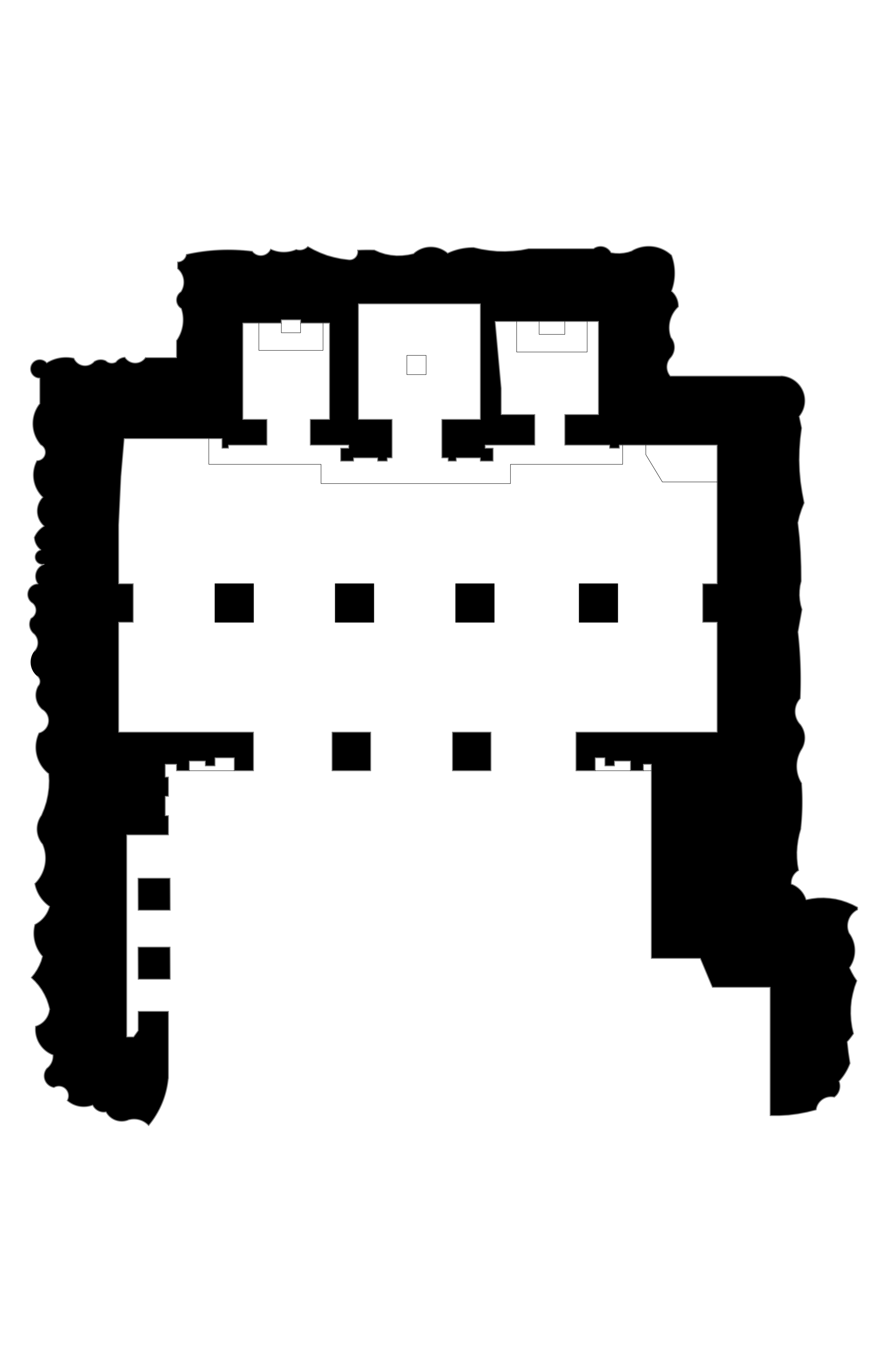
Floor plan of Cave II

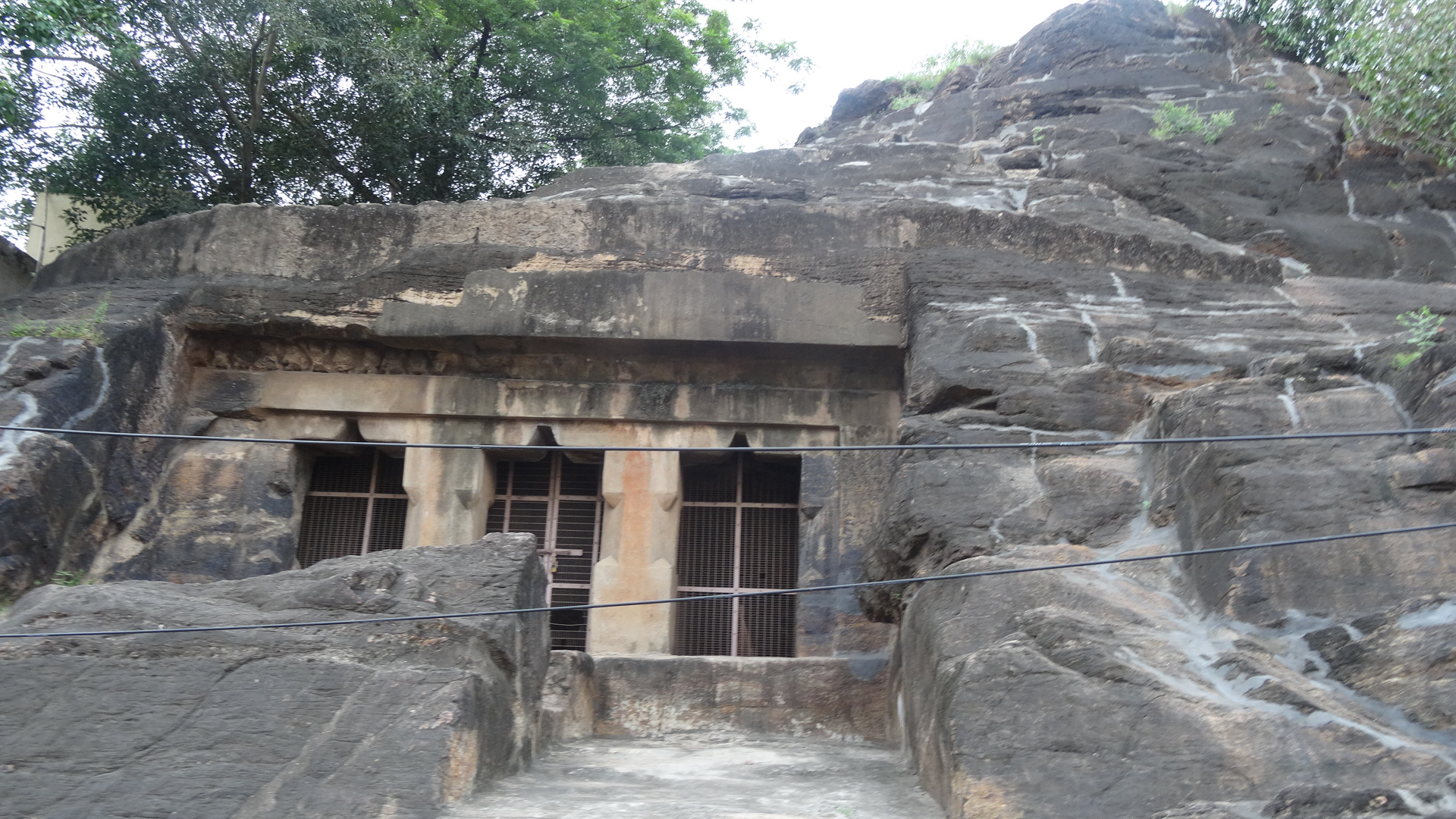
Cave II (Brahma-Shiva-Vishnu trimurti)

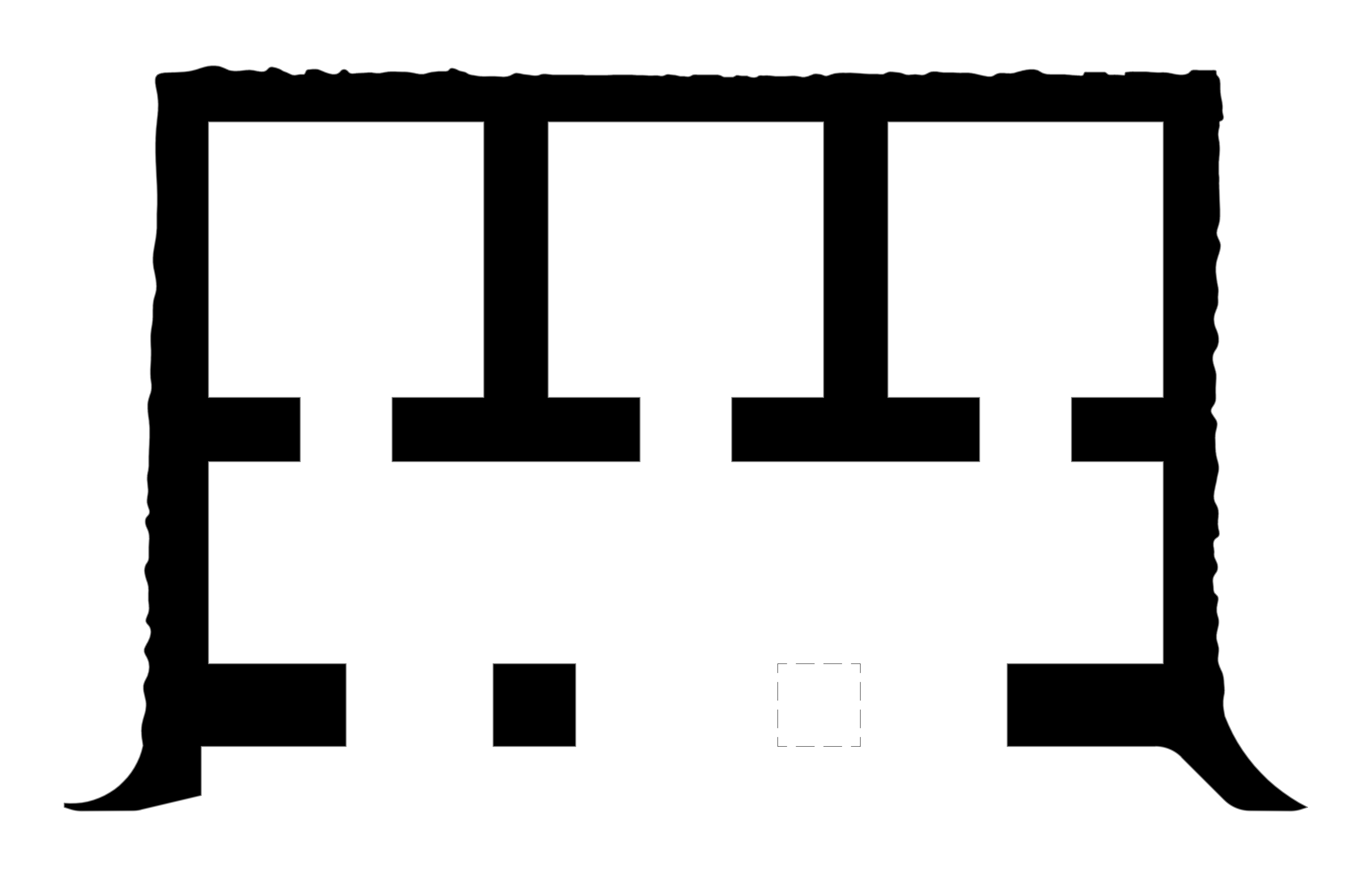
Floor plan of Cave V

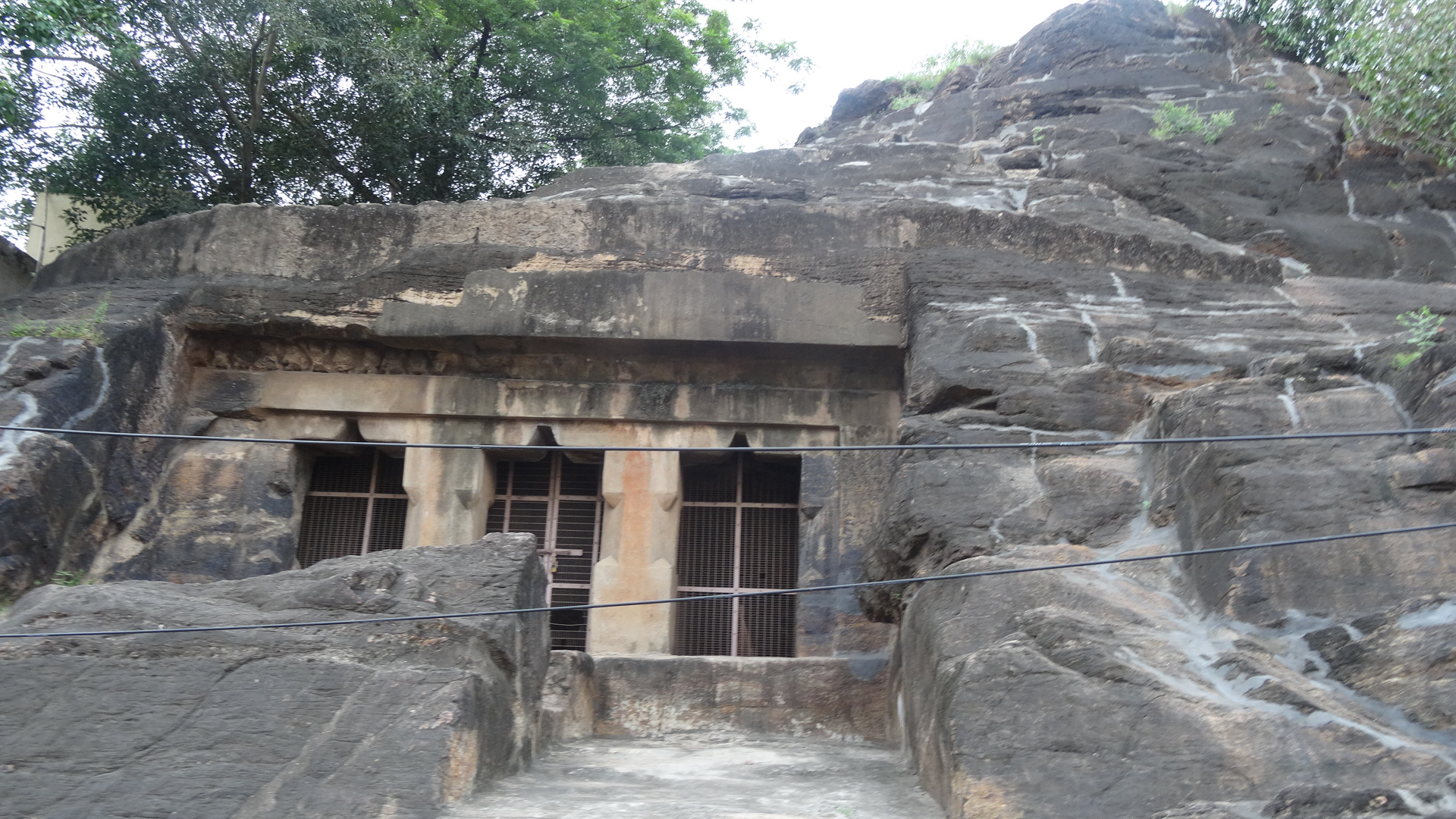
Cave II (Brahma-Shiva-Vishnu trimurti)

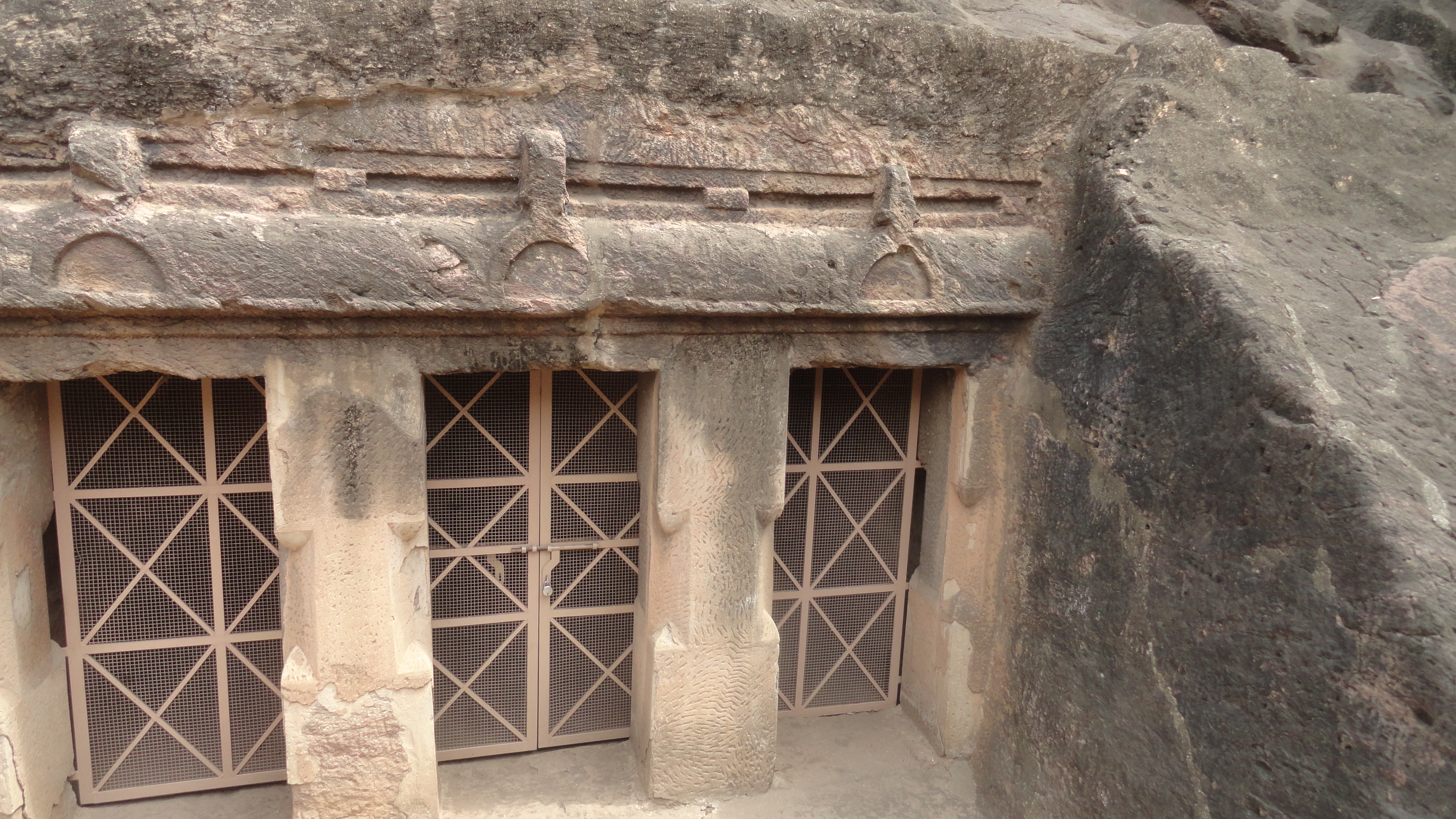
Cave III, some caves look similar, except for notch, niches and icons

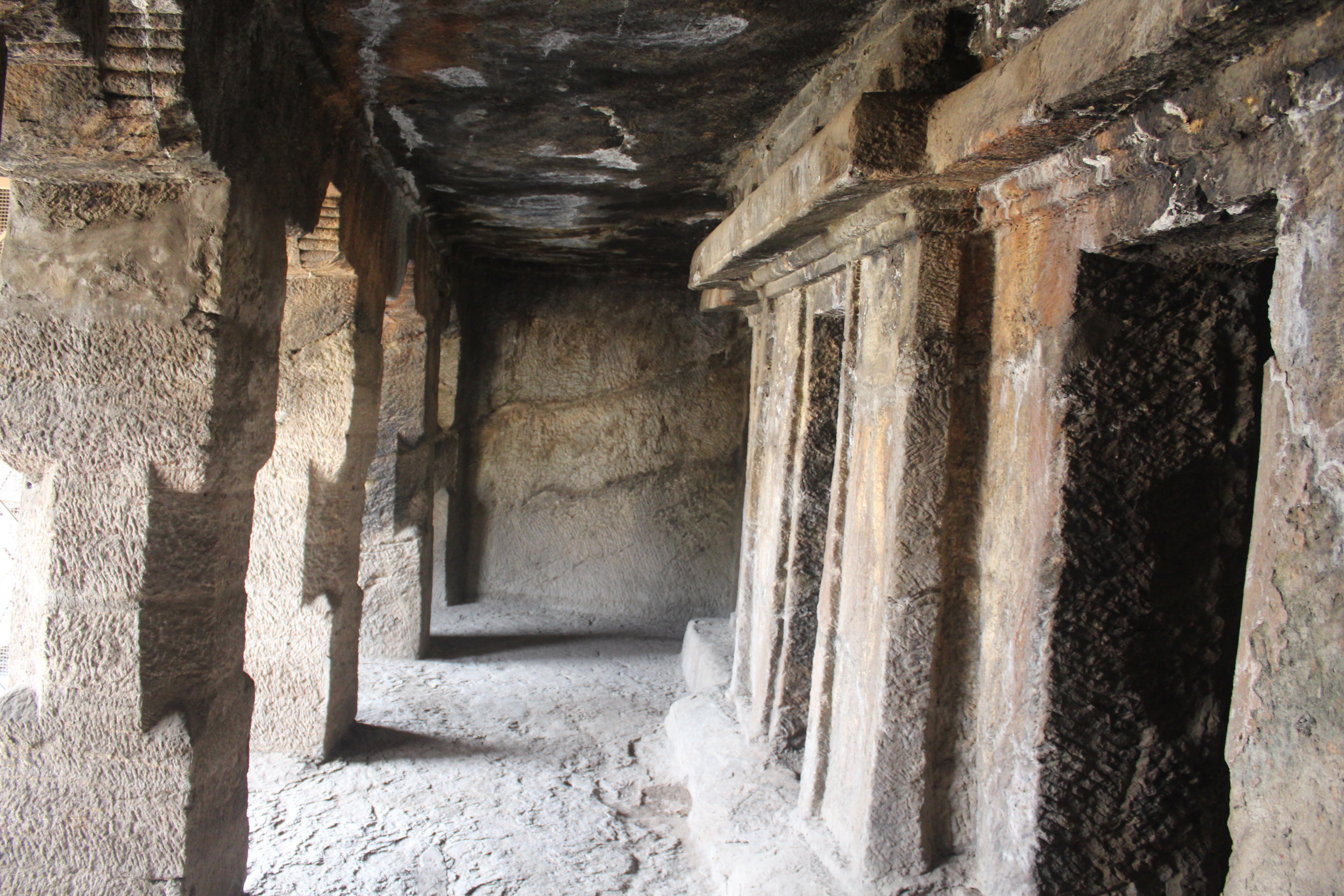
pillars and mandapa, Cave II

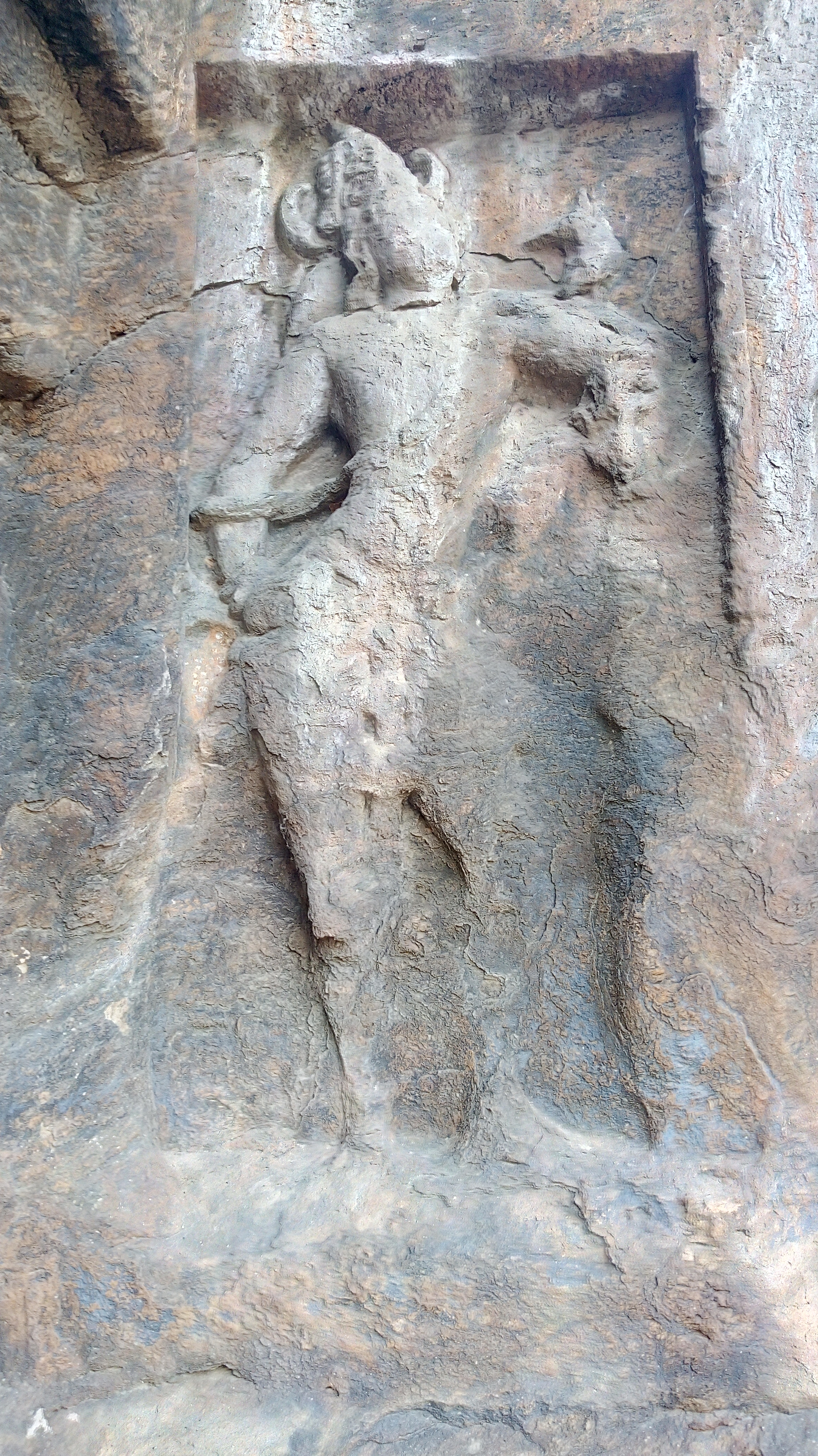
A dvarapala, Cave II

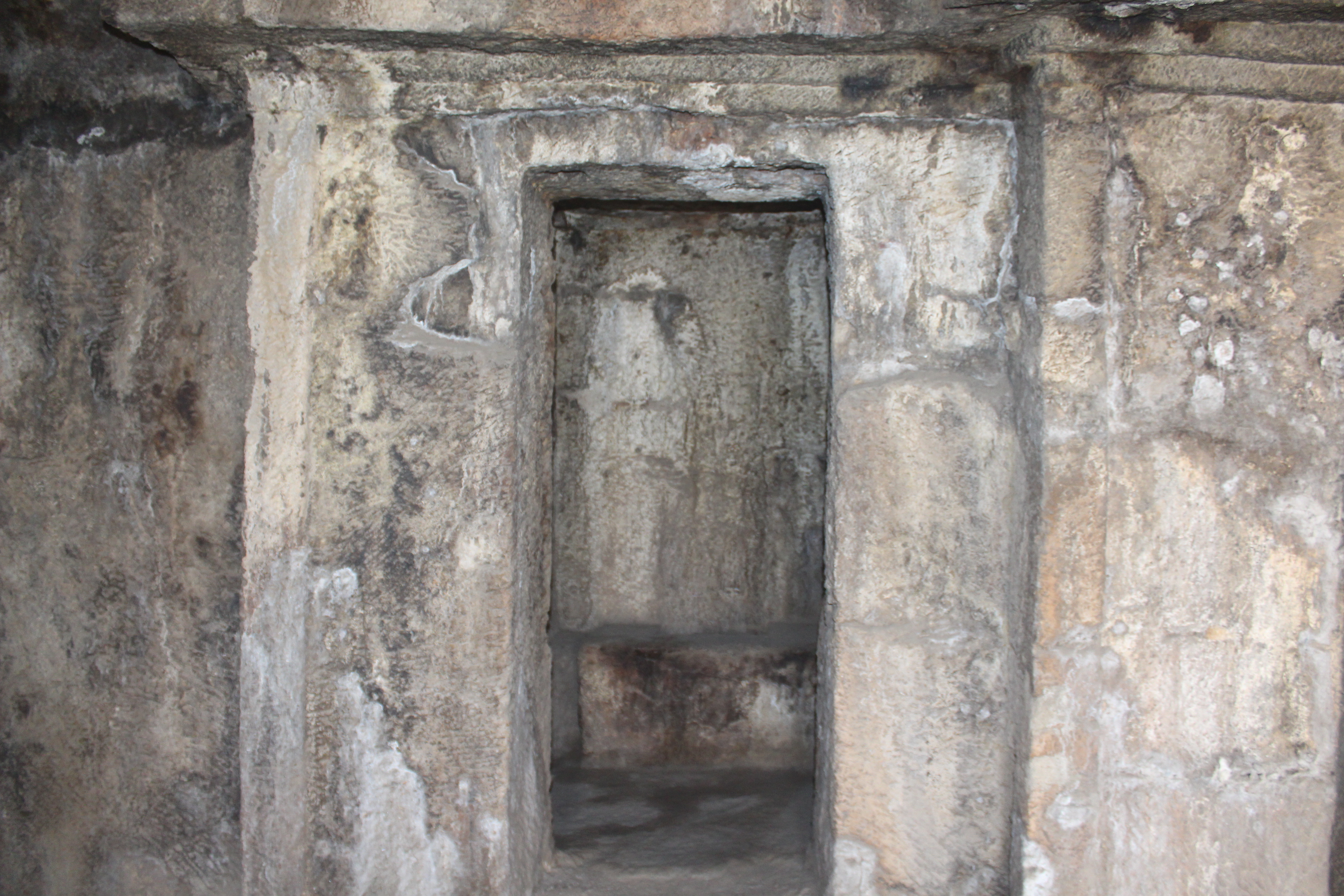
One of the small sanctums

== See also ==
- Akkanna Madanna Caves
- Undavalli Caves
