= Akkanna Madanna Caves =

7th-century Hindu cave temples in Vijayawada

Akkanna Madanna cave temple
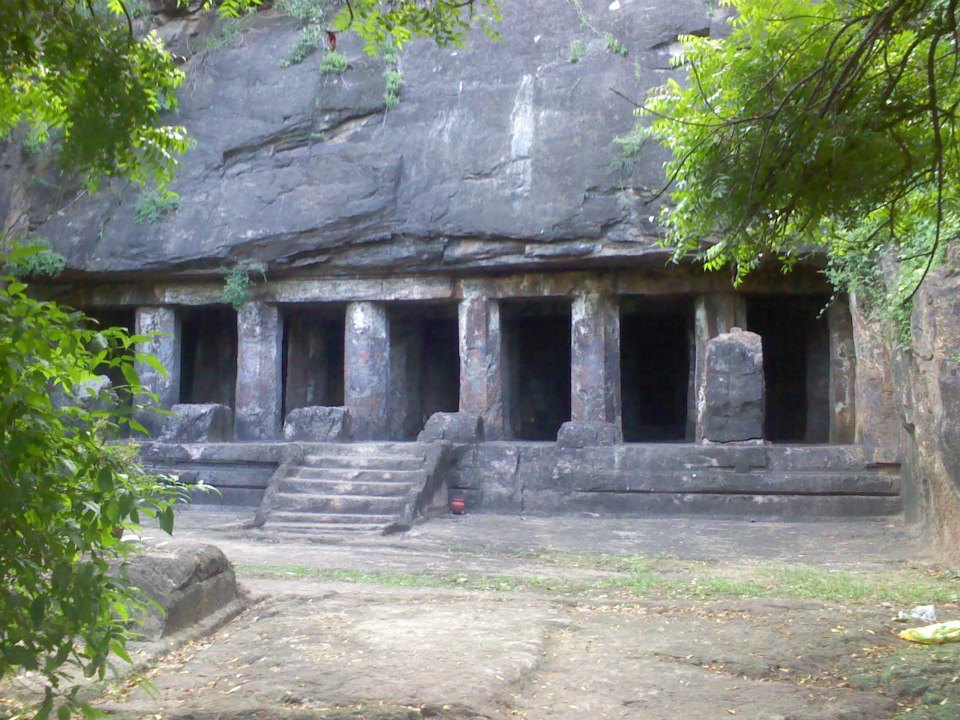

- Location within India Location within Andhra Pradesh

Religion
- Affiliation: Hinduism
- District: NTR District
- Deity: Hindu, various

Location
- Location: Vijayawada
- State: Andhra Pradesh
- Country: India
- Interactive map of Akkanna Madanna cave temple
- Coordinates: 16°30′50″N 80°36′24″E

Architecture
- Creator: Early Eastern Chalukya dynasty
- Completed: c. 650 CE

Akkanna Madanna caves are a group of rock-cut Hindu cave temples in Vijayawada, Andhra Pradesh, India. Dated to mid 7th-century and dedicated to Shiva, they were excavated by the Eastern Chalukya dynasty. They consist of the upper (larger) and lower caves. The upper cave is better preserved, and has an important 7th-century inscription.

To the immediate north of the lower caves is a small park with inscribed pillars and recovered ruins of lost Hindu temples. The Akkanna Madanna caves are protected monuments of national importance, managed by the Archaeological Survey of India.

== Location ==
The Akkanna Madanna caves are found in Vijayawada, Andhra Pradesh. They are situated at the foot of the Indrakiladri hill where the Kanaka Durga Temple is located. It is close to the Krishna river.

== Date, Nomenclature ==
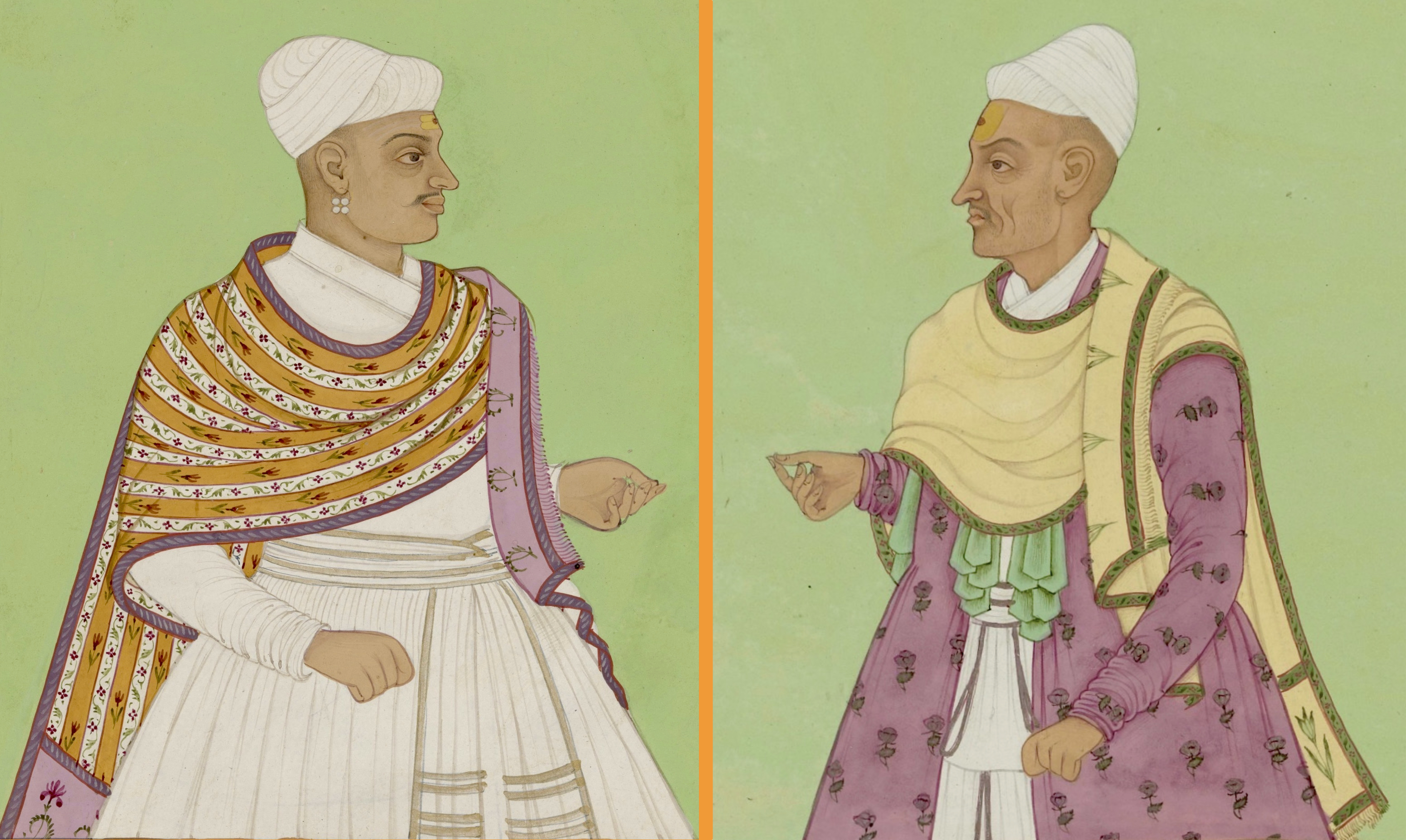
Akkanna and Madanna brothers, ministers in Golconda Sultanate

The Akkanna Madanna caves are from the mid-7th century and are the earliest of the Hindu rock-cut temples found in Krishna and Guntur districts of Andhra Pradesh. They were excavated during the Eastern Chalukya dynasty era. The nearby Mogalrajapuram caves were created shortly after the Akkanna Madanna caves, followed by the Undavalli caves, Penamaga caves, Sitaramapuram caves, and the Bhairavakonda caves – all by about mid-8th century. This view is not universal. For example, Archaeological Survey of India dates them between 6th and 7th-century.

Though the caves are from the 7th-century, or possibly earlier by some estimates, they are currently named after two brothers of the 17th-century – Akkanna and Madanna. Little is known with certainty about the early and mid life of Akkanna and Madanna. They became famous during the last decades of political and economic turmoil of the 17th-century Qutb Shahi dynasty, a Shia Islamic dynasty ruling Golconda Sultanate. Golconda was already under seize from Aurangzeb, then the governor of the Deccan region (later the Mughal emperor). The brothers helped Tana Shah gain the throne, and he appointed the brothers as ministers, making them responsible for collecting the jizya tax from the non-Muslim citizens (primarily Hindus representing most of the Golconda population). The brothers, according to Dutch East India Company archive records, soon were responsible for all collected taxes and the disbursal of the exchequer. With the control of the purse, their power grew. They used the taxes for the welfare of the people states Gijs Kruijtzer – a scholar known for his studies on Golconda Sultanate history. This included the upkeep of the temples, building new temples, and appointing more Brahmins including their famous nephew named Bhadrachala Ramadasu to various positions within the Golconda Sultanate.

Aurangzeb, when informed of the power of Akkanna and Madanna by the Muslim officials in the Golconda Sultanate, sent his army to attack it. After a seize and the payment of large tributes to the Mughal empire, soldiers led by Shah 'Alam – the son of Aurangzeb, beheaded Akkanna and Madanna. This assassination was done, by some accounts with the knowledge of Abul Hasan Tana Shah. By other accounts, Tana Shah was unaware and the heads of Akkanna and Madanna were sent to Aurangzeb's son. Several monuments in the former Golconda, including these caves continue to be remembered after the Akkanna and Madanna brothers.

== Description ==
The Akkanna Madanna Caves, like other early Eastern Chalukyan rock-cut temples, consist of a monolithic rock-cut hall, a mandapa and cave sanctums in the innermost part of the rock. They consist of two cave complexes – the upper (main, larger), and the lower cave.

Upper Cave

The main upper cave was created monolithically from a vertically rising, rocky cliff. It has a front court, then a mandapa with pillars. A regular adhishthana with a flight of six steps in the center is topped with a much damaged gaja surulyali (elephant head) balustrade. This is flanked by three square facade pillars and a pilaster on each side. This totals six facade pillars and two pilasters, all of which are now partially surviving as stumps of uneven heights, their top sections gone. These facade level pilasters are notable as they are similar those found in the Pandyan caves.

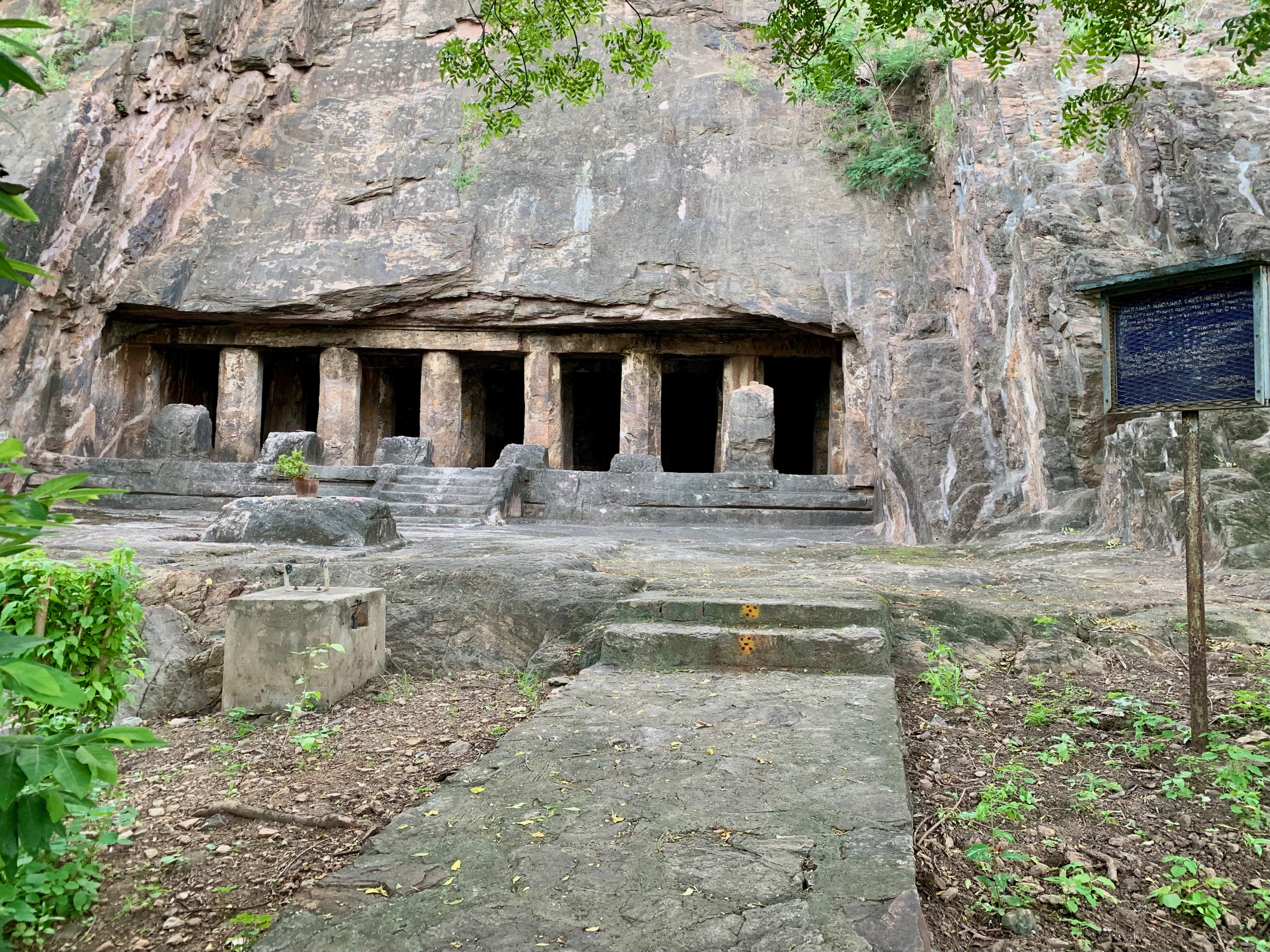
Upper Akkanna Madanna cave.

After the facade section, is a mandapa with two rows of six pillars and two pilasters each. These are octagonal pillars, and simple. Further inside is the sanctums section. This upper cave has three shrines on the back wall, each with projecting fronts, complete with a deep set prati and an adhishthana, with a shared continuous pattika. These are simpler and have no carvings, unlike the lower Akkanna Madanna cave and the nearby Mogalrajapuram caves. The faux plinth here is molded, and each shrine has a step into them.

The central shrine has a slightly larger door (0.84 meters) than the two side shrines (0.76 meters). The south side garbha griya is 1.45 meter square, the north side is a rectangle (1.3 by 2.2 meters), while the central cella is a larger 2.44 meter square. A notable difference between the three shrines is that the central sanctum is a cube (2.44 meter height), while the side shrines are a bit shorter though not a cube (2.05 meter height each). The central shrine was provided with a monolithically excavated Shiva linga, but much has been gouged out in vandalism, and is now replaced with shorter substitute. The side sanctums have a pedestal to place Brahma and Vishnu statues (now missing).

Outside, in the court is a damaged and eroded platform aligned with the central sanctum for Shiva. This is where the original architects placed a couchant Nandi (now missing). To the south of this Nandi pedestal and the steps into the mandapa, in the rock wall, is a fourth niche shrine. On the north side, nearly aligned to the Nandi pedestal is another niche shrine with steps. One of these niche shrines likely had a Ganesha.

The upper cave has a long important inscription on the free standing pillar to the south. It helps date this and many other cave temples found along the Krishna river valley, because all of them contain the phrase "Sri Utpati Pidugu". This helps compare them and date them relatively. The inscription in the Upper Akkala Madanna cave is paleographically more archaic than other nearby Andhra Pradesh inscriptions such as the Mogalrajapuram, Undavalli, Bhokardan and Satyavolu. The Akkanna Madanna caves can be therefore be dated to the 7th-century based on this inscription's alphabet style and fonts.

Lower Cave

The lower caves were also monolithically cut from the same rocky cliff. They are three sets of cave, of which the northernmost is least preserved, and the southernmost is the most preserved. All have a flight of steps, then a mahamandapa with two rows of two pillars, and then a sanctum in the back wall of the cave. All had two dvarapalas, but these have been gouged out. From the profile left behind, one pair may have been female dvarapalas (not uncommon in Hindu caves and temples). The pillars in the front have largely decayed, likely from natural erosion of Khondalite gneiss – the composition of the lower rock. The lower caves were a bit more decorated with makara torana and other artwork.

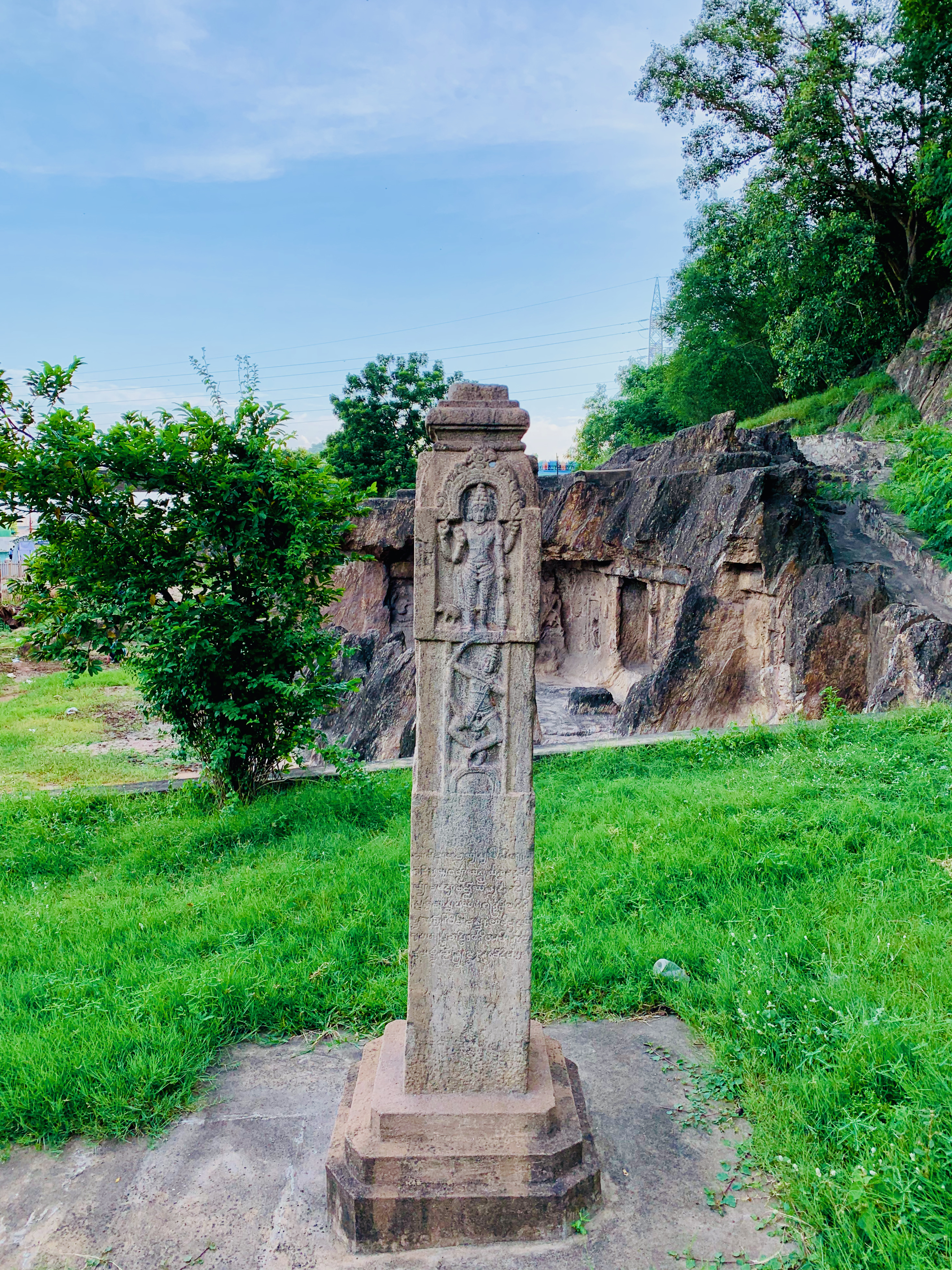
The Kiratarjuna pillar near the lower Akkanna Madanna cave.

The cella are square (2.36 meter in one case, 1.90 meter in another), and the ceilings of the lower caves are notable for its square artwork. The sanctums were provided with linga, nala and sockets for drainage, attesting these were once active temples and that all sanctums were dedicated to different forms of Shiva. The southern wall of the mahamandapa has a niche with valampuri four-armed Ganesha.

The lower cave is unusual for combining a cave excavation with the methods of building and revealing out parts of a monolithic temple from a pre-existing rock. Further, the roof of the sanctums show a significant systematic effort to carve out a shikhara superstructure in an alpa-vimana format, in-situ. Though much of this has been mutilated and survives in fragmented form, a careful trace shows that the Chalukyan shilpins created a form that is closest to the Nagara-rekha style, of the type seen is the Alampur group of Hindu temples and in Biccavolu. This experiment by historic Telugu region shilpins emerged in a more spectacular form in the Undavalli caves, a few decades later.

Other monuments

To the north of the lower caves is a small park. It contains inscribed pillars, a restored inscribed granite mandapa and recovered mutilated ruins found from nearby damaged temples. Of these, a notable pillar is the Kiratarjuna pillar with artwork and inscription clearly visible on all four sides. This pillar was on the hill side far up, close to the Kanaka Durga temple. It was moved here after 1950 to make room for infrastructure, preservation and the convenience of the visitors. The inscription on this pillar is from the 9th-century. It along with the panels recite the Hindu legend about Arjuna's yogic effort to gain the pasupata weapon from Shiva. This legend is found in its short form in the Mahabharata, and in the most extensive form in the Kiratarjuniya – a classic Sanskrit poetry by Bharavi.

== Nearby sites ==
- Kanaka Durga Temple
- Mogalrajapuram Caves
- Undavalli Caves
- Bhairavakona Caves

== Gallery ==
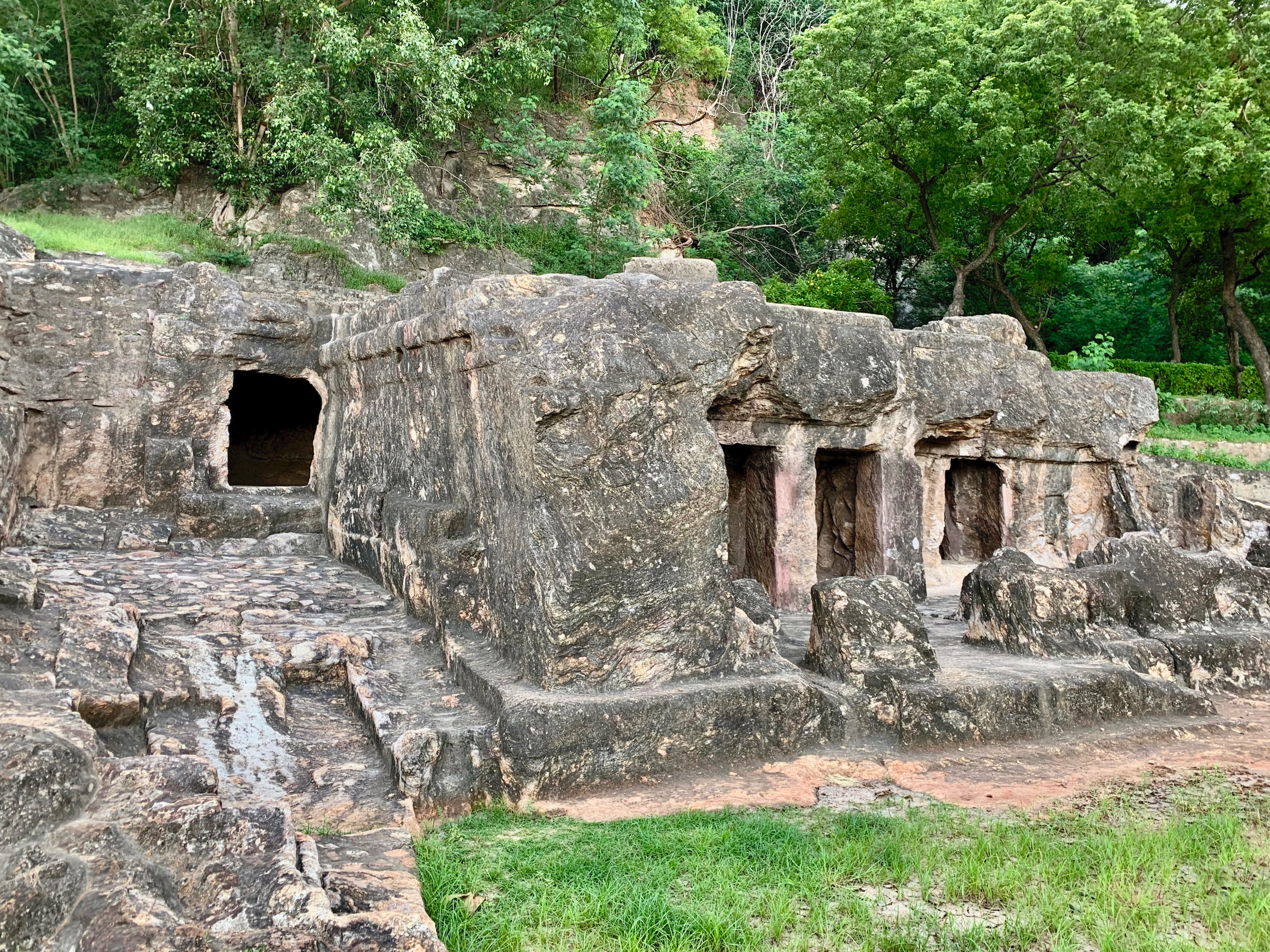
Lower cave, left view

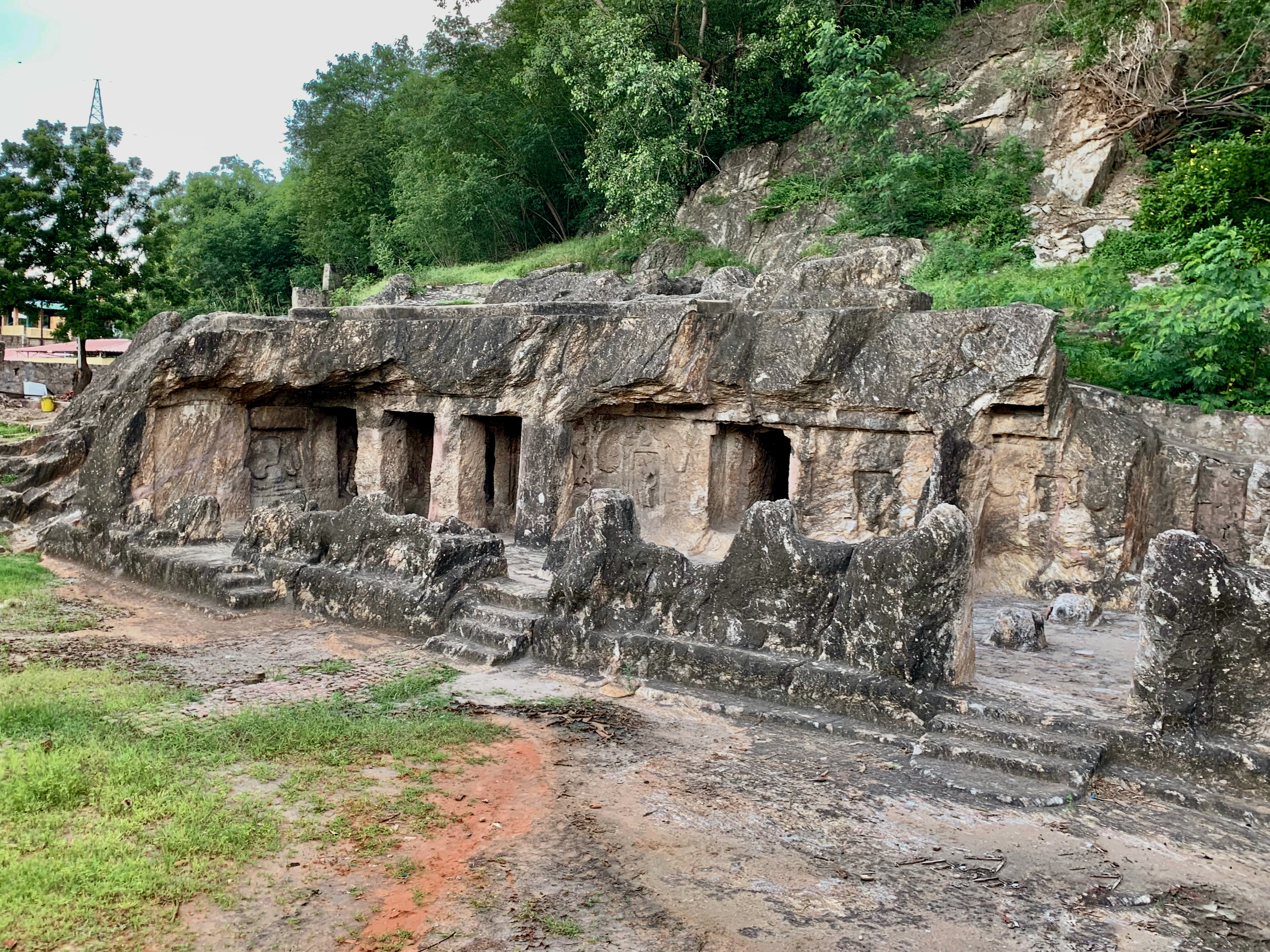
Lower cave, right view

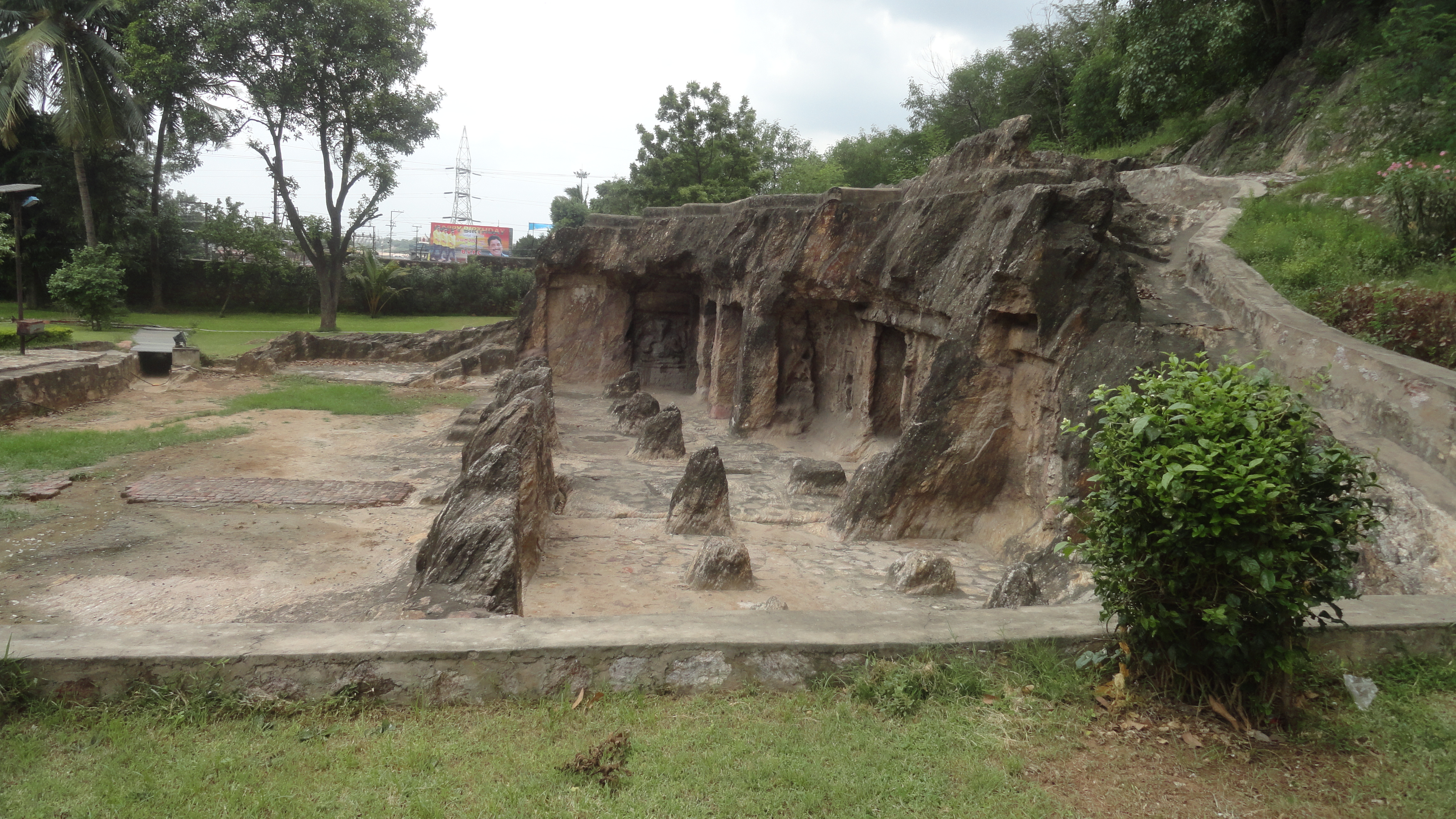
A view of the lost pillars and open mandapa, lower cave

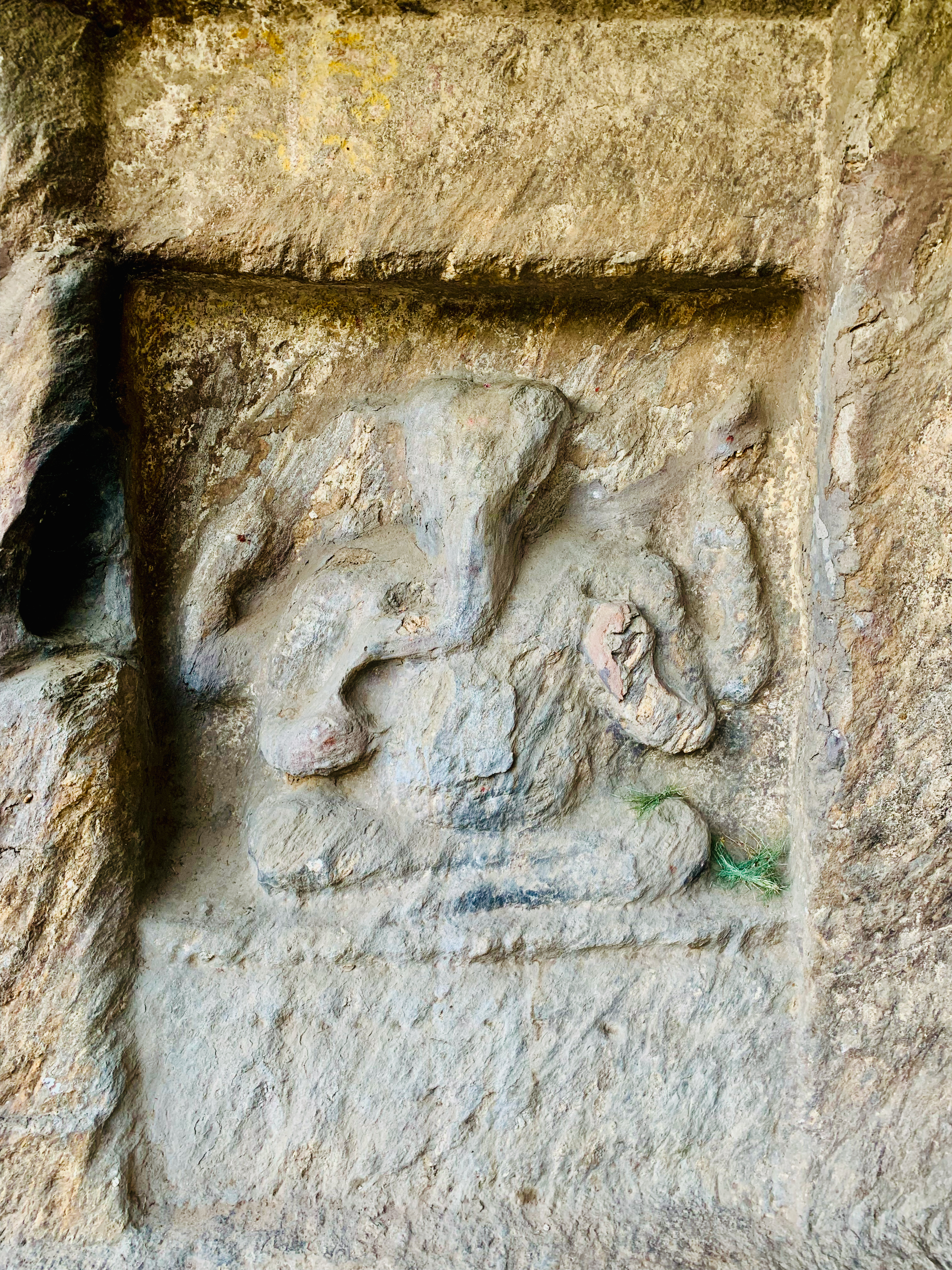
Ganesha, lower cave

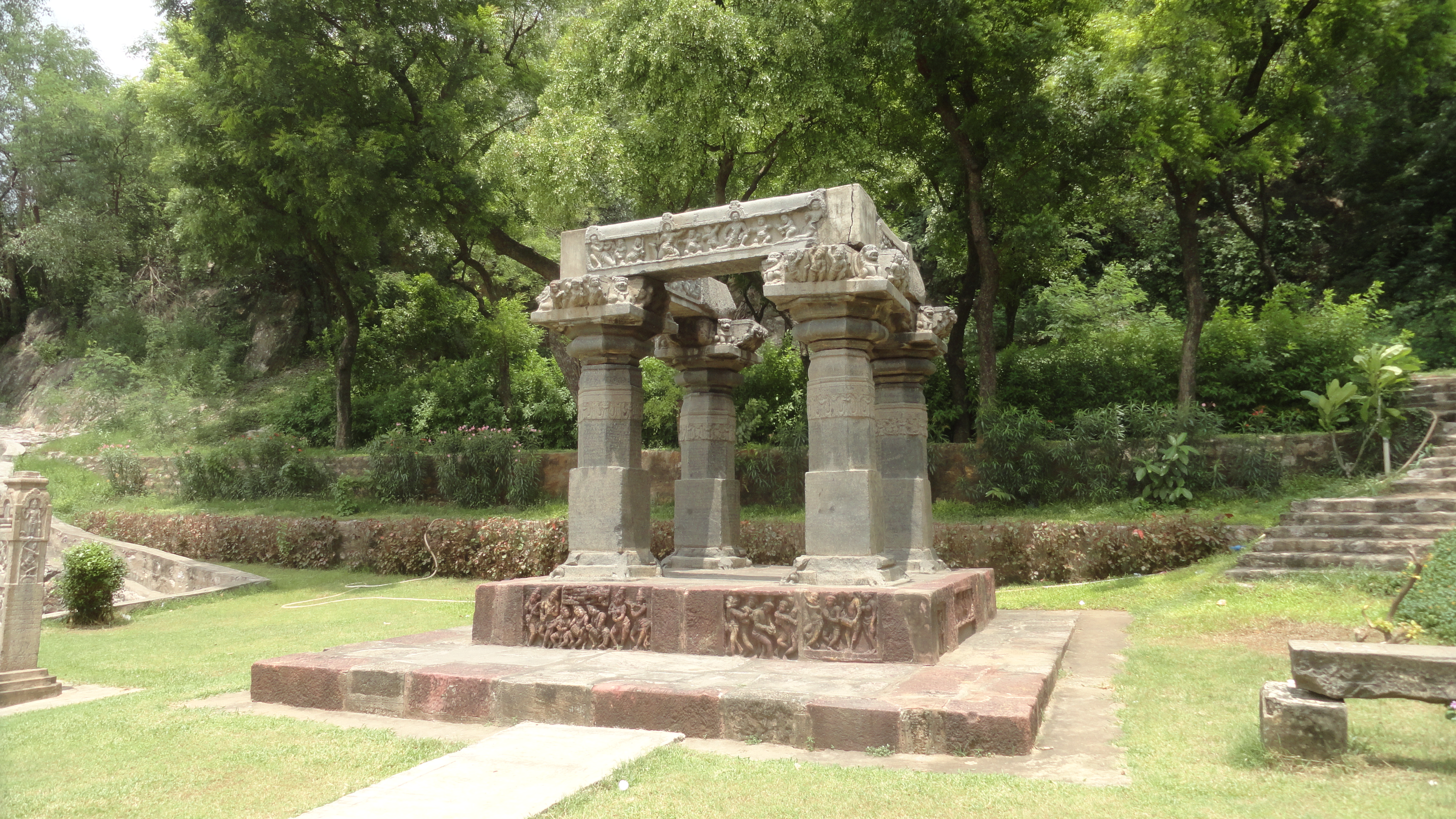
A restored mandapa near the Akkanna Madanna lower cave

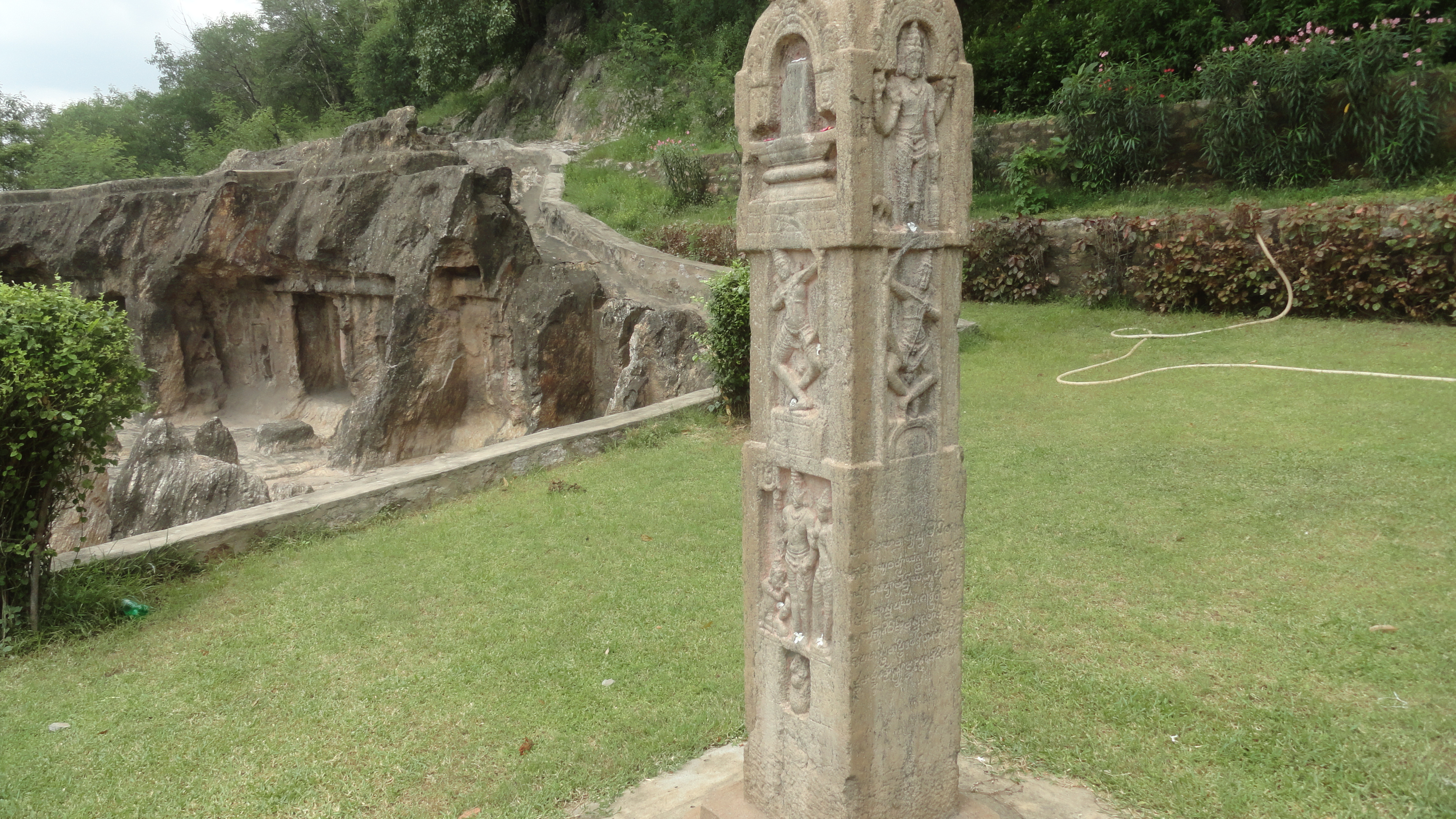
The inscribed Kiratarjuna pillar, now near lower cave, restored from the Durga temple hill above.

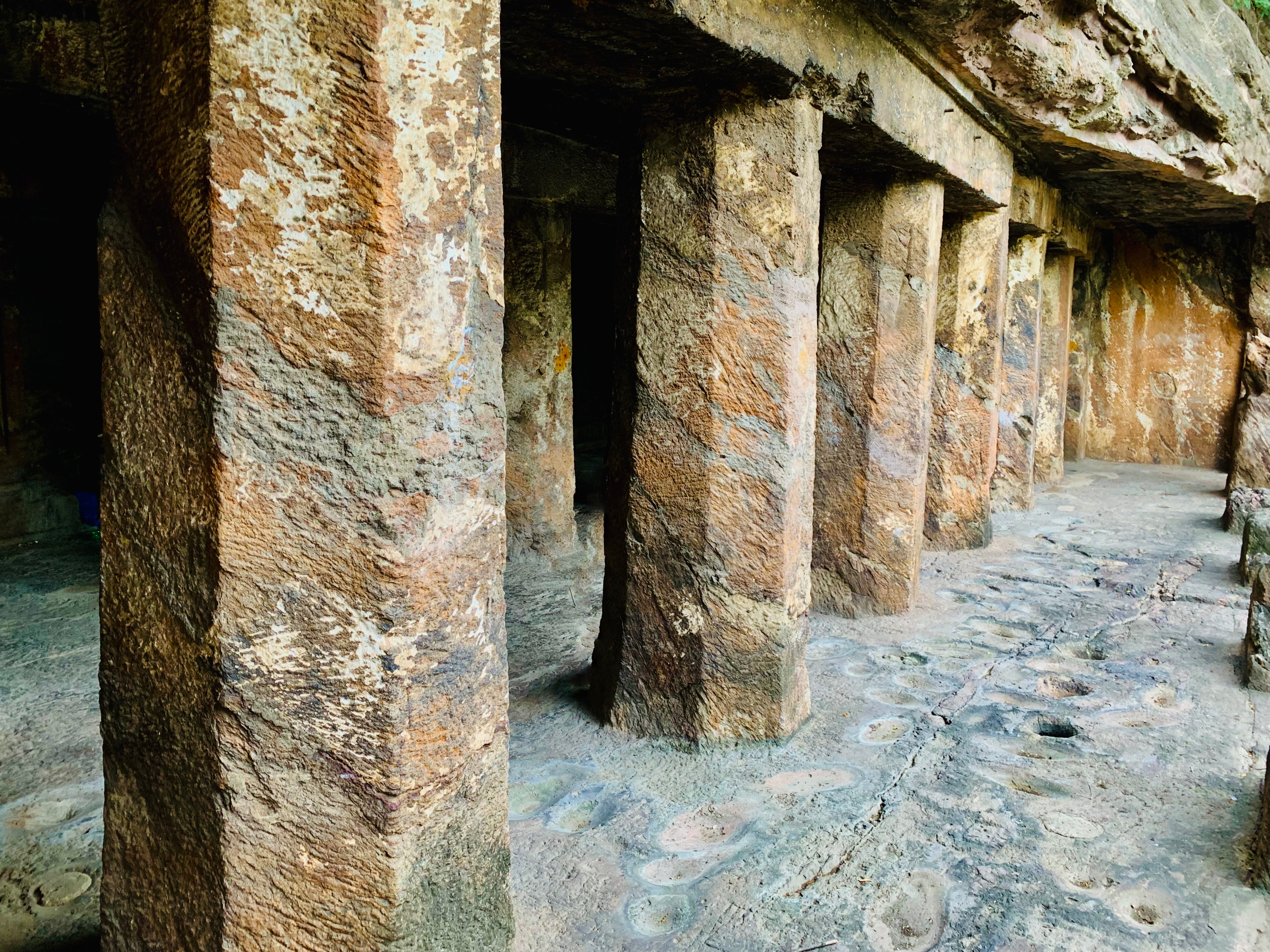
Upper cave, mandapa pillars

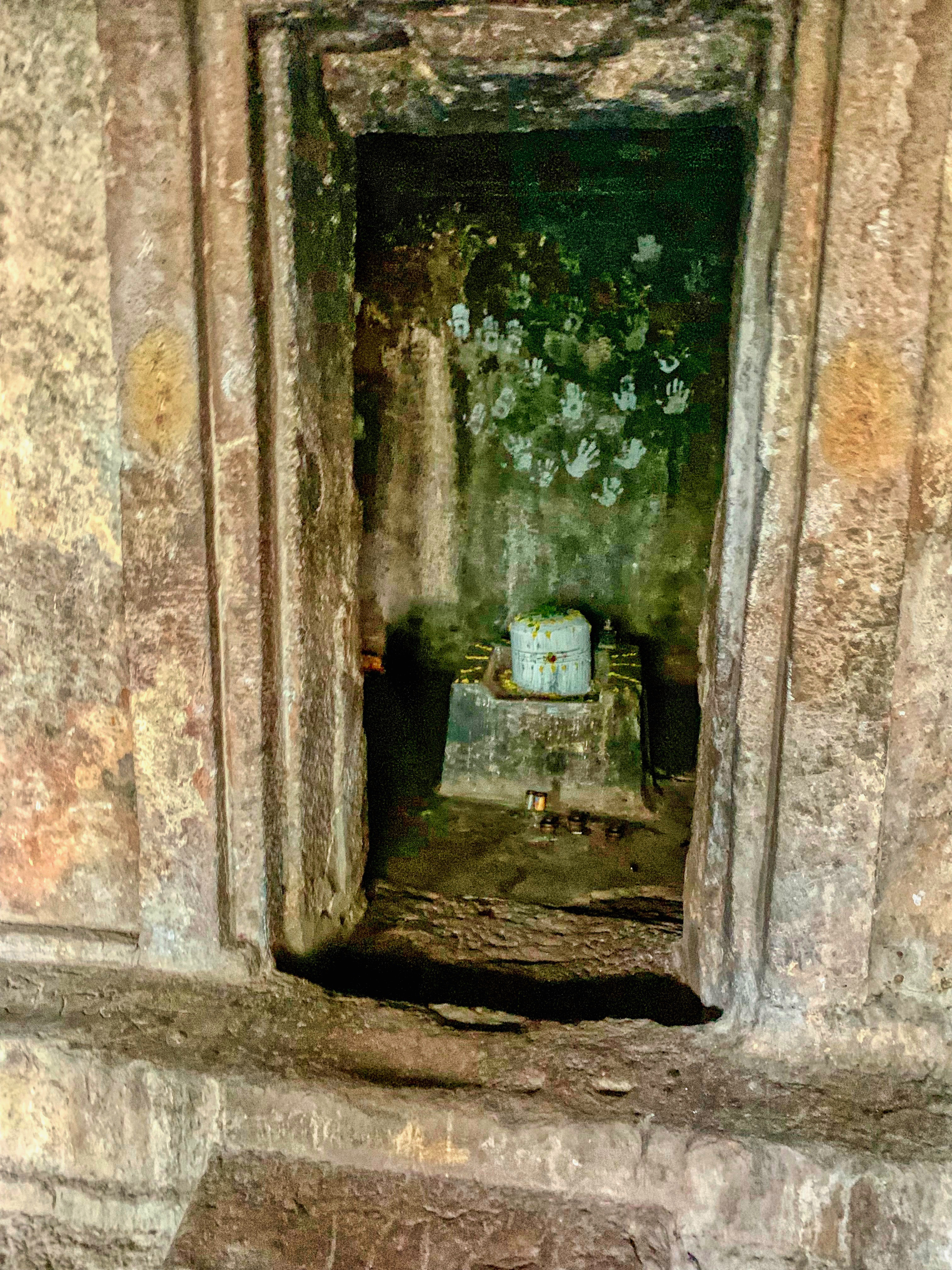
Upper cave, a sanctum

== See also ==
- Mogalrajapuram Caves
- Undavalli Caves
