= List of villages in Guntur district =

Guntur district in Andhra Pradesh

As of 2011 census of India, the following villages are recognized in Guntur district, Andhra Pradesh, India. This list is organized alphabetically by mandal. Settlements not counted in the 2011 census are not included.

For the current list of villages with wikipedia articles, see Category:Villages in Guntur district

== A ==
#	Amaravathi mandal	Amruthalur mandal	Atchampet mandal
1	Amaravathi (village)	Amruthalur	Ambadipudi
2	Attalur	Bodapadu	Challagariga
3	Dharanikota	Govada	Chamarru
4	Didugu	Intur	Chigurupadu
5	Endroyi	Koditadiparru	Chintapalle
6	Enikapadu	Kuchipudi	Ginjupalle
7	Jupudi	Moparru	Kastala Agraharam
8	Karlapudi	Mulpur	Kogantivaripalem Agraharam
9	Lemalle	Panchalavaram	Konduru
10	Lingapuram	Peddapudi	Konuru
11	Malladi	Pyaparru	Madipadu Agraharam
12	Munugodu	Thurumella	Madipadu Seri
13	Narukullapadu	Yedavuru	Mittapalem
14	Nemalikallu		Orvakallu
15	Pedda Madduru		Pedapalem
16	Pondugala		Taduvoy
17	Unguturu		Tallacheruvu
18	Vykuntapuram		Velpuru

== B ==
#	Bapatla mandal	Bellamkonda mandal	Bhattiprolu mandal	Bollapalle mandal
1	Adivi	Bellamkonda	Addepalli	Ayyannapalem
2	Appikatla	Bodanam	Bhattiprolu	Bollapalle
3	Bapatla East (Rural)	Chandrajupalem	Gorigapudi	Gandiganumala
4	Bapatla West (Rural)	Chityala	Konetipuram	Garikapadu
5	Bharthipudi	Emmajigudem	Oleru	Gummanampadu
6	Cheruvu	Kethavaram	Pallekona	
7	Etheru	Kolluru	Pedalanka	Kanumalacheruvu
8	Gopapuram	Machayapalem	Pedapulivarru	Mellavagu
9	Gudipudi	Mannesultanpalem	Pesarlanka	Perurupadu
10	Jammulapalem	Papayapalem	Sivangulapalem	Ravulapuram
11	Jillellamudi	Pulichinta	Surepalle	Remidicherla
12	Kankatapalem	Vannayapalem	Vellaturu	Sarikondapalem
13	Maruproluvaripalem (Rural)	Venkatayapalem		Vaddemgunta
14	Mulapalem	Kandipadu		Vellaturu
15	Murukondapadu			MUGACHINTHALA PALEM
16	Narasayapalem			
17	Neredupalle			
18	Palaparthipadu			
19	Poondla			
20	Velicherla			kandipadu

== C ==
#	Chebrolu mandal	Cherukupalle H/O Arumbaka mandal	Chilakaluripet H/O Purushotha Patnam mandal
1	Chebrolu	Arepalle	Boppudi
2	Godavarru	Arumbaka	Edavalli
3	Manchala	Balusulapalem	Gottipadu
4	Meesaragadda Ananthavaram	Gudavalli	Govindapuram
5	Narakodur	Kanagala	Kavuru
6	Pathareddipalem	Kavuru	Kukkapallevaripalem
7		Nadimpalle	Manukondavaripalem
8	Sekuru	Ponnapalle	Murikipudi
9	Sreerangapuram	Rajavolu	Pasumarru
10	Suddapalle	Rambhotlapalem	Pothavaram
11	Thotlapalem		Rajapeta
12	Vadlamudi		Thatapudi
13	Vejendla		Veluru

== D ==
#	Dachepalle mandal	Duggirala mandal	Durgi mandal
1	Alugumallipadu	Chiluvuru	Adigoppula
2	Bhatrupalem	Chinapalem	Atmakur
3	Dachepalle	Chintalapudi	Darivemula
4	Gamalapadu	Devarapalle Agraharam	Dharmavaramm
5	Kesanapalle	Duggirala	Durgi
6	Madinapadu	Emani	Kolagutla
7	Mutyalampadu	Godavarru	Mutukuru
8	Nadikudi	Kantamraju Konduru	Nidanampadu
9	Pedagarlapadu	Morampudi	Obulesunipalle
10	Pondugula	Pedakondur	Polepalle
11	Ramapuram	Penumuli	
12	Takkellapadu	Perukalapudi	
13	Tangeda	Srungarapuram	
14		Tummapudi	

== E ==
#	Edlapadu mandal
1	Chengizkhanpeta
2	Edlapadu
3	Ganesuni Vari Palem
4	Jaladi
5	Karuchola
6	Kondaveedu
7	Marripalem
8	Mydavolu
9	Sandepudi
10	Solasa
11	Thimmapuram
12	Thurlapadu
13	Unnava
14	Vankayalapadu

== G ==
#	Guntur East mandal (Note: Budampadu, Etukur, Gorantla and Reddypalem gram panchayats were merged into Guntur East mandal (former Guntur mandal))	Guntur West mandal (Note: Ankireddipalem, Chowdavaram, Nallapadu, Pedapalakaluru, Pothuru and R Agraharam gram panchayats were merged into Guntur West mandal (former Guntur mandal))	Gurazala mandal
1	Jonnalagadda	Chinapalakaluru	Ambapuram
2			Cherlagudipadu
3			Daida
4			Gangavaram
5			Gogulapadu
6			Gottimukkala
7			Gurazala
8			Jangamaheswara puram
9			Jonnalagadda
10			Madugula
11			Pallegunta
12			Pulipadu
13			Telukutla
14			Thurakapalem
15			Gopichettipalle

== I ==
#	Ipur mandal
1	Agnigundala
2	Angalur
3	Bommarajupalle
4	Chittapuram
5	Dasullapalle
6	Gundepalle
7	Inumella
8	Ipur
9	Kondayapalem
10	Kondramutla
11	Kotcherla
12	Muppalla
13	Vanikunta
14	Udijerla

== K ==
#	Kakumanu mandal	Karempudi mandal	Karlapalem mandal	Kollipara mandal	Kollur mandal	Krosuru mandal
1	Appapuram	China Kodamagundla	Buddam	Annavaram	Ananthavaram	Ananthavaram
2	Bhallukanudupalem	Chinagarlapadu	Ganapavaram	Annvarapu lanka	Boddulurupadu	Andukuru
3	Bodipalem	Chintapalle	Karlapalem	Athota	Chilumuru	Balemarru
4	Chinalingayapalem	Karempudi	Perali	Bommuvaripalem	Chinapulivarru	Bayyavaram
5	Garikapadu	Miriyala	Yazali	Chemudupadu	Donepudi	Dodleru
6	Kakumanu	Narmalapadu		Chivalur	Gajullanka	Garikapadu
7	Kollimarla	Peda Kodamagundla		Danthalur	Guruvindapalle	Gudipadu
8	Kommuru	Petasannigandla		Davuluru	Ipur	Hassanbada
9	Kondapaturu	Sankarapuram Siddhayi		Kollipara	Kollur	Krosuru
10	Pandrapadu	Singarutla		Kunchavaram	Pedalanka	Parupalle
11	Rayaprolu	Voppicherla		Munnangi	Potharlanka	Peesapadu
12	Returu			Pidaparru	Ravikampadu	Thalluru
13	Telagayapalem			Siripuram		Vipparla
14	Valluru			Thumuluru		Vutukuru
15				Vallabhapuram		Vuyyandana

== M ==
#	Machavaram mandal	Macherla mandal	Mangalagiri mandal	Medikonduru mandal	Muppalla mandal
1	Gangireddypalem	Jammalamadaka	Chinavadlapudi	Bollavaram	
2	Chennayapalem	Kambhampadu	Chinnakani	Korrapadu	Dammalapadu
3	Machavaram	Koppunur	Dokiparru	Mandapadu	Gollapadu
4	Mallavolu	Kothapalle	Kaza	Mangalagiripadu	Lankelakurapadu
5	Pillutla	Macherla (Rural)	Krishnayapalem	Medikonduru	Madala
6	Pinnelli	Mutyalampadu	Kuragallu	Paladugu	Muppalla
7	Srirukminipuram	Nagulavaram	Nidamarru	Perecherla	Narnepadu
8	Tadutla	Pasuvemula	Nutakki	Potlapadu	Palidevarlapadu
9	Vemavaram	Rayavaram	Pedavadlapudi	Siripuram	Thondapi
10	Kothaganesunipadu	Thallapalle	Ramachandrapuram	Varagani	Chagantivaripalem
11	Morjampadu	Vijayapuri South		Velavarthipadu	
12	Singrayapalem tanda			Visadala	

== N ==
#	Nadendla mandal	Nagaram mandal	Narasaraopet mandal	Nekarikallu mandal	Nizampatnam mandal	Nuzendla mandal
1	Chandavaram	Allaparru	Dondapadu Agraharam	Chagallu	Adavuladeevi	Chintalacheruvu
2	Chirumamilla	Dhulipudi	Ellamanda	Challagundla	Amudalapalli	Inavolu
3	Ganapavaram	Edupalle	Ikkurru	Cheemalamarri	Dindi	Khambhampadu
4	Gorijavolu	Eletipalem	Jonnalagadda	Chejerla	Kuchinapudi	Kondraprolu
5	Irlapadu	Nagaram	Kakani	Gundlapalle	Muthupalle Agraharam	Mukkellapadu
6	Kanaparru	Pamidimarru	Kesanapalle	Kunkalagunta	Nizampatnam	Mulakalur
7	Nadendla	Pedamatlapudi	Kondakavuru	Narasingapadu	Pallapatla	Murthuzapuram
8	Nuzellapalli Agraharam	Pedapalle	Lingamguntla Agraharam (Rural)	Nekarikallu	Pragnam	Nuzendla
9	Sankurathripadu	Peddavaram	Mulakalur	Rupenaguntla	Linginenivaripalem	Pamidipadu
10	Satuluru	Pudivada	Narasaraopeta Rural	Tripurapuram	Konaphalam	Peddavaram
11	Tubadu	Siripudi	Palapadu		Kalliphalam	Putchanuthala
12	Appapuram	Thotapalle	Pamidipadu Agraharam		Pillalavaripalem	Puvvada
13		Kolaganivaripalem	Petlurivaripalem		Chakkavaripalem	T.Annavaram
14			Ravipadu		Garuvupalem	Talarlapalle
15			Uppalapadu		Purlameraka	Tellabadu
16					Kothapalem	Thangirala
17						Thimmapuram
18						Tripurapuram
19						Uppalapadu
20						V.Appapuram
21				Kotha Cheruvukommu Palem		

== P ==
#	Pedakakani mandal	Pedakurapadu mandal	Pedanandipadu mandal	Phirangipuram mandal	Piduguralla mandal	Pittalavanipalem mandal	Ponnur mandal	Prathipadu mandal		
1	Agatha Varappadu	75-Tyallur	Abbineniguntapalem	Annaparru	113 Thalluru	China Agraharam		Allur	Aremanda	Edulapalem
2	Anumarlapudi	Balusupadu	Annavaram	Aminabad	Guttikonda	Chandole	Brahmanakodur	Enamadala		
3	Devarayabhotlapalem	Chinamakkena	Gorijavoluguntapalem	Bethapudi	Janapadu	Khajipalem	Chintalapudi	Ganikapudi		
4	Koppuravuru	Garapadu	Katrapadu	Erraguntlapadu	Julakallu	Komali	Dandamudi	Gottipadu		
5	Namburu	Hussainnagaram	Kopparru	Gundalapadu	Kamepalle	Pittalavanipalem	Doppalapudi	Kondajagarlamudi		
6	Pedakakani	Jalalpuram	Nagulapadu	Havusuganesa	Karalapadu	Sangupalem Kodur	Jadavalli	Kondepadu		
7	Takkellapadu	Kambhampadu	Palaparru	Merikapudi	Konanki		Jupudi	Mallayapalem		
8	Tangellamudi	Kasipadu	Pedanandipadu	Nudurupadu	Peda Agraharam		Kondamudi	Nadimpalem		
9	Uppalapadu	Lagadapadu	Pusulur	Phirangipuram	Tummalacheruvu		Mamillapalle	Prathipadu		
10	Venigandla	Lingamguntla	Rajupalem	Ponugupadu	Brahmanapalli			Mannava	Vangipuram	
11		Mussapuram	Ravipadu	Repudi			Mulukuduru			
12		Patibandla	Uppalapadu	Sirangipalem			Munipalli			
13		Pedakurapadu	Varagani	Takkellapadu			Nandur			
14		Podapadu		Vemuluripadu			Patchalatadiparru			
15		Ramapuram		Vemavaram			Upparapalem			
16		Butchiahpalem					Vaddemukkala			
17		Abbarajupalem					Vallabharaopalem			
18							Vellalur			

== R ==
#	Rajupalem mandal	Rentachintala mandal	Repalle mandal	Rompicharla mandal
1	Balijepalle	Goli	Aravapalle	Alavala
2	Chowtapapayapalem	Jettipalem	Bethapudi	Annavaram
3	Ganapavaram	Mallavaram	Chatragadda	Annavarappadu
4	Kubadpuram	Manchikallu	Chodayapalem	Arepalli Agraharam
5	Nemalipuri	Mittagudipadu	Gangadipalem	Dasaripalem
6	Rajupalem	Paluvoi	Isukapalle (Rural)	Gogulapadu
7	Reddigudem	Pasarlapadu	Kaithepalle	Konakanchi Vari Palem
8	Uppalapadu	Rentachintala	Kamarajugadda	Machavaram
9	kotanemalipuri	Rentala	Karumuru	Muthanapalli
10		Tumrukota	Kanagala Vari Palem	Nallagarlapadu
11			Nalluru	Rompicherla
12			Penumudi	Santhagudipadu
13			Peteru	Thurumella
14			Potumeraka	Vipparla
15			Singupalem	Vipparlapalle Agraharam
16			Uppudi	
17			Visweswaram	
18			Vuyyuri Vari Palem	
19			Thuraka Palem	

== S ==
#	Sattenapalle mandal	Savalyapuram H/O Kanamarlapudi
1	Abburu	Kanamarlapudi
2	Bhatlur	Karumanchi
3	Bhimavaram	Kothalur
4	Bhrugubanda	Pitchikalapalem
5	Dhulipalla	Potluru
6	Gorantla	Sanampudi
7	Gudipudi	Velupuru
8	Kankanalapalle	
9	Kantepudi	
10	Kattamuru	
11	Kattavaripalem	
12	Komerapudi	
13	Lakkarajugarlapadu	
14	Nandigama	
15	Pakalapadu	
16	Panidem	
17	Pedamakkena	
18	Rentapalla	

== T ==
#	Tadepalli mandal	Tadikonda mandal	Tenali mandal	Thullur mandal	Tsundur mandal
1	Chirravuru	Bandarupalle	Angalakuduru	Abbarajupalem	Alapadu
2	Gundimeda	Bejatpuram	Burripalem	Ainavolu	Chinaparimi
3	Ippatam	Damarapalle	Chinaravuru (rural)	Ananthavaram	Edlapalle
4	Kolanukonda	Kantheru	Devarapalliseri	Borupalem	Kothapalle Narikellapalle
5	Kunchanapalle	Lachannagudipudi	Gudivada	Dondapadu	Manduru
6	Mellempudi	Lam	Katevaram	Harischandrapuram	Modukuru
7	Penumaka	Mothadaka	Kolakaluru	Kondamarajupalem	Pedagadelavarru
8		Nidumukkala	Nandivelugu	Lingayapalem	Penugudurupadu
9		Nelapadu	Malkapuram	Mandadam	Thottempudi
10		Ponnekallu	Pedaravuru	Nekkallu	Tsundur
11		Ravela	Pinapadu	Nelapadu	Valiveru
12		Tadikonda	Sangam Jagarlamudi	Pedaparimi	Vetapalem
13			Somasundara Palem	Pitchikalapalem	Dundipalem
14				Rayapudi	
15				Sakhamuru	
16				Thullur	
17				Uddandarayunipalem	
18				Vaddamanu	
19				Velagapudi	
20				Venkatapalem	

== V ==
#	Vatticherukuru mandal	Veldurthi mandal	Vemuru mandal	Vinukonda mandal
1	Ananthavarappadu	Gottipalla	Abbanagudavalli	Andugulapadu
2	Chamallamudi	Gundlapadu	Balijepalle	Brahmanapalle
3	Garapadu	Kandlakunta	Chadalawada	Chowtapalem
4	Karempudipadu	Mandadi	Chavali	Dondapadu
5	Katrapadu	Patlaveedu	Jampani	Enugupalem
6	Kornepadu	Rachamallipadu	Kuchellapadu	Gokanakonda
7	Kovelamudi	Srigiripadu	Penumarru	Koppukonda
8	Kurnoothala	Uppalapadu	Peravali	Nagulavaram
9	Lemallepadu	Veldurthi	Peravalipalem	Naragayapalem
10	Mutluru		Pothumarru	Narasarayanipalem
11	Pallapadu		Pulichinthalapalem	Nayanipalem
12	Vatticherukuru		Varahapuram	Neelagangavaram
13	Yamarru		Vemuru	Pedakancherla
14	Vinjanampadu			Perumallapalle
15				Sattenapalle
16				Sivapuram
17				Surepalle
18				Thimmayapalem
19				Ummadivaram
20				Venkupalem
21				Vittamrajupalle

== See also ==
- List of villages in Krishna district
