= Varagani =

- Village
- Interactive map of Varagani
- Location in Andhra Pradesh, India
- Coordinates: 16°05′N 80°20′E
- Country: India
- State: Andhra Pradesh
- District: Guntur
- Mandal: Pedanandipadu

Government
  - Type: Panchayati raj
  - Body: Varagani gram panchayat

Area
  - Total: 1,892 ha (4,680 acres)

Population (2011)
  - Total: 3,874
  - Density: 204.8/km^{2} (530.3/sq mi)

Languages
  - Official: Telugu
- Time zone: UTC+5:30 (IST)
- PIN: 522235
- Area code: +91–863
- Vehicle registration: AP

Varagani is a village in Guntur district of the Indian state of Andhra Pradesh. It is located in Pedanandipadu mandal of Guntur revenue division.

== Geography ==
Varagani is situated to the north of the mandal headquarters, Pedanandipadu, at 16°05′N 80°20′E. It is spread over an area of 1,892 ha (4,680 acres).

== Demographics ==
As of 2011 census, the village has the population of 3874 of which 1864 are males and 2010 are females. Average Sex Ratio of the village is 1078 which is higher than Andhra Pradesh state average of 993. The population of children under age 0-6 is 376 which makes up 9.71 % of total population of the village. Child Sex Ratio for the Pedanandipadu as per census is 1055, higher than Andhra Pradesh average of 939. In 2011, literacy rate of Pedanandipadu village was 70.61 % compared to 67.02 % of Andhra Pradesh.

== Governance ==
Varagani gram panchayat is the local self-government of the village. It is divided into wards and each ward is represented by a ward member. The village forms a part of Andhra Pradesh Capital Region and is under the jurisdiction of APCRDA.

== Education ==
As per the school information report for the academic year 2018–19, the village has only one MPP school.

== See also ==
- List of villages in Guntur district
