= Ravipadu, Pedanandipadu mandal =

Ravipadu
- panchayat
- Interactive map of Ravipadu
- Location in Andhra Pradesh, India
- Coordinates: 16.133797°N 80.353045°E
- Country: India
- State: Andhra Pradesh
- District: Guntur
- Mandal: Pedanandipadu

Government
  - Type: Panchayati raj
  - Body: Ravipadu gram panchayat

Area
  - Total: 756 ha (1,870 acres)

Population (2011)
  - Total: 3,815
  - Density: 505/km^{2} (1,310/sq mi)

Languages
  - Official: Telugu
- Time zone: UTC+5:30 (IST)
- PIN: 522xxx
- Area code: +91–8641
- Vehicle registration: AP

Ravipadu is a village in the Guntur district of the Indian state of Andhra Pradesh. It is located in Pedanandipadu mandal of Guntur revenue division.

== Demographics ==
As of 2011 census, the village has population of 3815 of which 1851 are males and 1964 are females. Average Sex Ratio of the village is 1061 which is higher than Andhra Pradesh state average of 993. The population of children aged 0–6 in Pedanandipadu is 254, accounting for 6.66% of the village’s total population. The child sex ratio is 827, which is lower than the Andhra Pradesh state average of 939. As per the 2011 census, the literacy rate in Pedanandipadu was 69.47%, higher than the Andhra Pradesh average of 67.02%.

== Government and politics ==
Ravipadu gram panchayat is the local self-government of the village. It is divided into wards and each ward is represented by a ward member. The ward members are headed by a Sarpanch.

== Education ==
As per the school information report for the academic year 2018–19, the village has a total of 10 schools. These include one government, 3 Zilla Parishad/Mandal Parishad and 6 private schools.

== See also ==
- List of villages in Guntur district
