= Ravela =

- Village
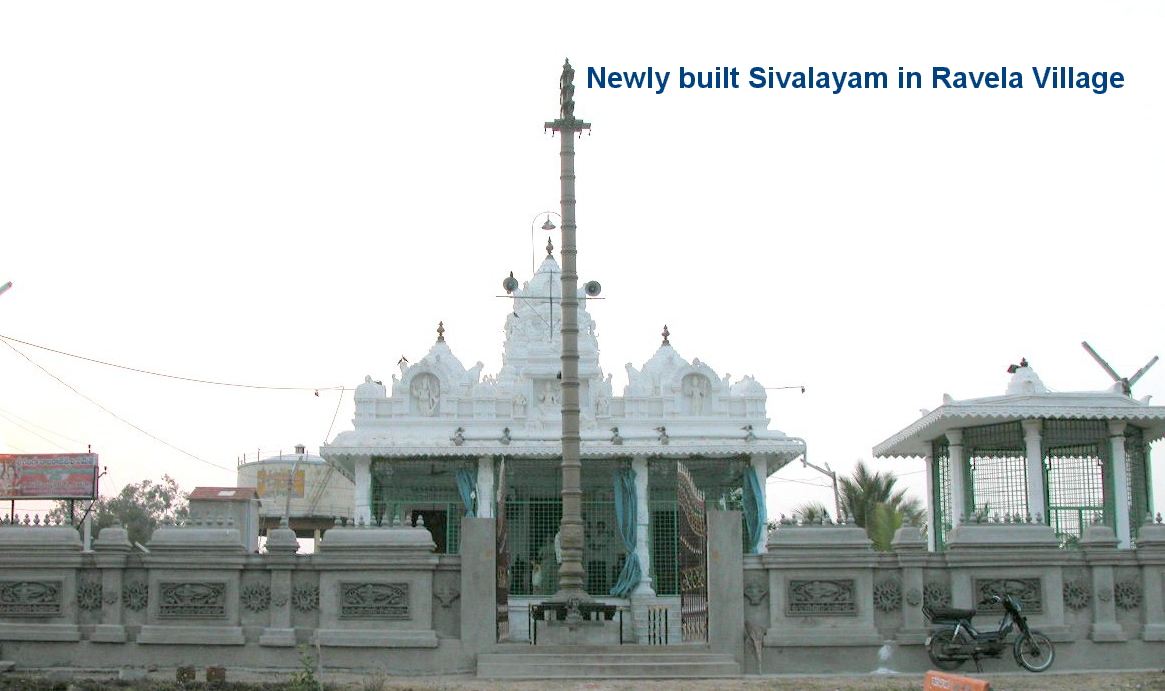
- Siva Tempele in Ravela
- Interactive map of Ravela
- Location in Andhra Pradesh, India
- Coordinates: 16.4062°N 80.4010°E
- Country: India
- State: Andhra Pradesh
- District: Guntur
- Mandal: Tadikonda

Government
  - Type: Panchayati raj
  - Body: Ravela gram panchayat

Area
  - Total: 1,460 ha (3,600 acres)

Population (2011)
  - Total: 5,782
  - Density: 396/km^{2} (1,030/sq mi)

Languages
  - Official: Telugu
- Time zone: UTC+5:30 (IST)
- PIN: 522018
- Area code: +91–8663
- Vehicle registration: AP

Ravela is a village in Guntur district of the Indian state of Andhra Pradesh. It is located in Tadikonda mandal of Guntur revenue division. It forms a part of Andhra Pradesh Capital Region.

== Government and politics ==
Lam gram panchayat is the local self-government of the village. It is divided into wards and each ward is represented by a ward member. The ward members are headed by a Sarpanch.

== See also ==
- List of villages in Guntur district
