= Palaparru =

- Village
- Interactive map of Palaparru
- Location in Andhra Pradesh, India
- Coordinates: 16.062°N 80.285°E
- Country: India
- State: Andhra Pradesh
- District: Guntur
- Mandal: Pedanandipadu

Government
  - Type: Panchayati raj
  - Body: Palaparru gram panchayat

Area
  - Total: 1,237 ha (3,060 acres)

Population (2011)
  - Total: 3,027
  - Density: 244.7/km^{2} (633.8/sq mi)

Languages
  - Official: Telugu
- Time zone: UTC+5:30 (IST)
- PIN: 522xxx
- Area code: +91–8641
- Vehicle registration: AP

Palaparru is a village in Guntur district of the Indian state of Andhra Pradesh. It is located in Pedanandipadu mandal of Guntur revenue division.

== Government and politics ==
Palaparru gram panchayat is the local self-government of the village. It is divided into wards and each ward is represented by a ward member. The ward members are headed by a Sarpanch.

== Education ==
As per the school information report for the academic year 2018–19, the village has a total of 3 schools. These include one private and 2 Mandal Parishad schools.

== Places of worship ==
| Name | Denomination |
|---|---|
| Sri Venugopala Swamy Temple | Hinduism |
| Sri Ramalayam Temple | Hinduism |
| Sri Shivalayam Temple | Hinduism |
| Sri BrhmamGari Temple | Hinduism |
| Sri Renuka Ellamma Thalli Temple | Hinduism |
| Sri Tella Vari Elavelpu Temple | Hinduism |
| Poleramma Temple | Hinduism |
| Luthern Church | Christianity / Lutheranism |
| Palaparru Baptist Church | Christianity / Baptists |
| Sion Church & Fellowship | Christianity |

== See also ==
- List of villages in Guntur district
