= Mothadaka =

- Village
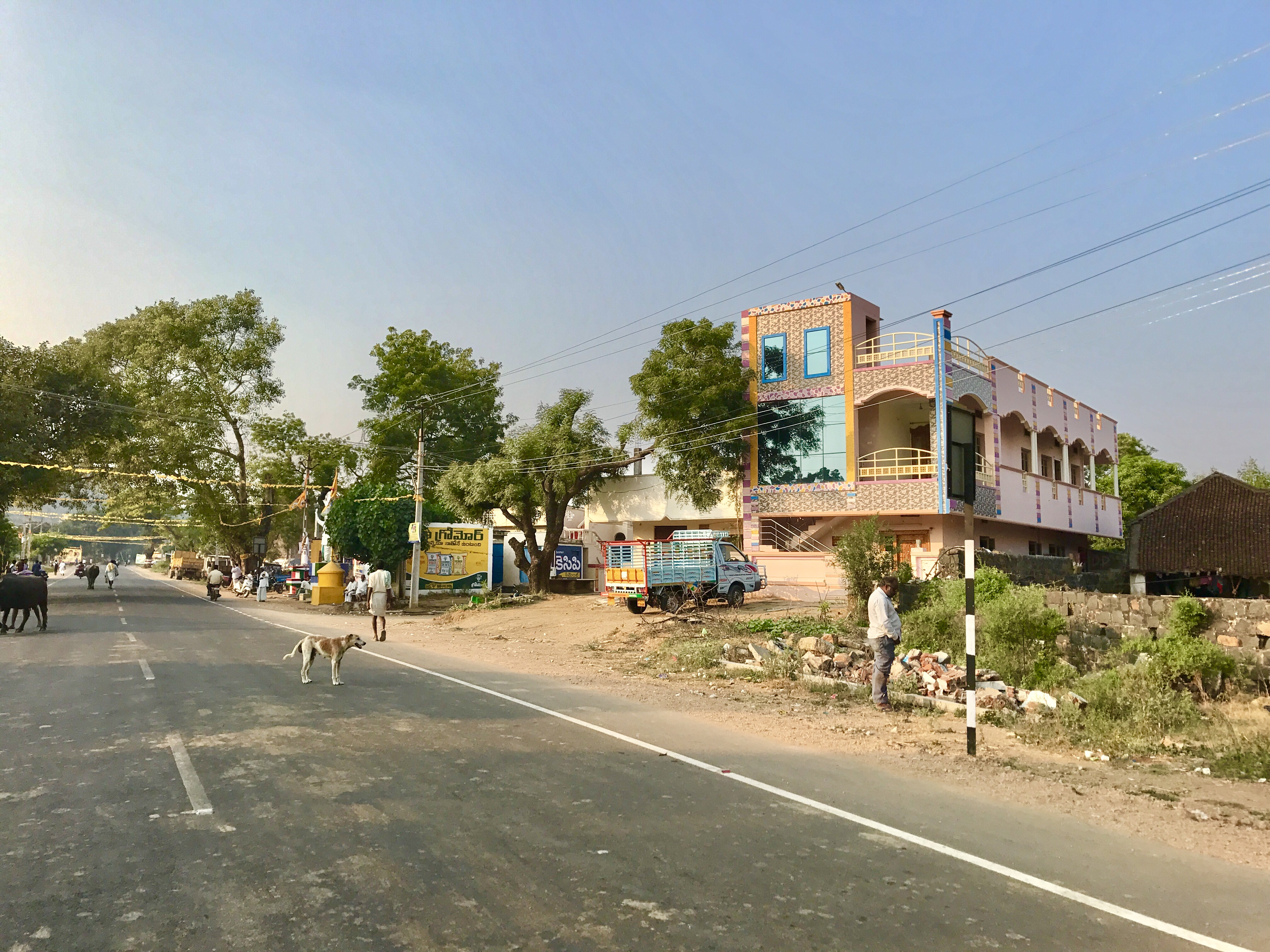
- Mothadaka Village
- Interactive map of Mothadaka
- Location in Andhra Pradesh, India
- Coordinates: 16.470709°N 80.403094°E
- Country: India
- State: Andhra Pradesh
- District: Guntur
- Mandal: Tadikonda

Government
  - Type: Panchayati raj
  - Body: Mothadaka gram panchayat

Area
  - Total: 949 ha (2,350 acres)

Population (2011)
  - Total: 3,266
  - Density: 344/km^{2} (891/sq mi)

Languages
  - Official: Telugu
- Time zone: UTC+5:30 (IST)
- PIN: 522016
- Area code: +91–8645
- Vehicle registration: AP07/AP08(Reserved)

Mothadaka is a village in Guntur district of the Indian state of Andhra Pradesh. It is located in Tadikonda mandal of Guntur revenue division. It forms a part of Andhra Pradesh Capital Region.

== Government and politics ==
Lam gram panchayat is the local self-government of the village. It is divided into wards and each ward is represented by a ward member. The ward members are headed by a Sarpanch.

== See also ==
- List of villages in Guntur district
