= Bandarupalle =

- Village
- Interactive map of Bandarupalle
- Location in Andhra Pradesh, India
- Coordinates: 16°22′27″N 80°21′30″E
- Country: India
- State: Andhra Pradesh
- District: Guntur
- Mandal: Tadikonda

Government
  - Type: Panchayati raj
  - Body: Bandarupalle gram panchayat
  - Sarpanch: Manohar Muppalla

Area
  - Total: 1,930 ha (4,800 acres)

Population (2011)
  - Total: 5,063
  - Density: 262/km^{2} (679/sq mi)

Languages
  - Official: Telugu
- Time zone: UTC+5:30 (IST)
- PIN: 522018
- Area code: +91–863
- Vehicle registration: AP 07

Bandarupalle is a village in Guntur district of the Indian state of Andhra Pradesh. It is located in Tadikonda mandal of Guntur revenue division. It forms a part of Andhra Pradesh Capital Region.

The total population of the Village is around 5000 and total voting is 2833 as of 2019 General Elections. Bandarupalle is 10 km far away from Guntur city via Palakaluru road. Bandarupalle has a Railway Station but only passenger through trains has stopping and this was the only commute to villagers back until the 1980-1990s. Nowadays, the Bus and Auto facilities are available along with trains to commute to/from the village. The neighborhood villages are Perecharla, Mallavaram, Garikapadu, Ravela, Mandapadu, and Visidala.

Bandarupalli has a religiously diverse population comprising Hindu, Christian, and Muslim residents. The village includes multiple Hindu places of worship, including the Sivalayam, Ramalayam, Lakshminarasimha Swamy, Veerabrahmendra Swamy, and Lakshmi Thirupathamma Thalli temples, alongside a mosque and churches. The Hindu goddess Jellamma Thalli is widely venerated across all religious and caste groups in the community.

Villagers primary occupation is cultivation and major farming into Cotton, Chillis, Turmeric and Rice. Village has Nagarjuna sagar right branch canal on which farmers majorly depends for the farming.

== Government and politics ==
Bandarupalle gram panchayat is the local self-government of the village. It is divided into 12 wards and each ward is represented by a ward member. The ward members are headed by a Sarpanch.

Bandarupalle is part of Tadikonda(SC) assembly constituency and Guntur Parliament constituency.

== See also ==
- List of villages in Guntur district
