= Nidumukkala =

- Village
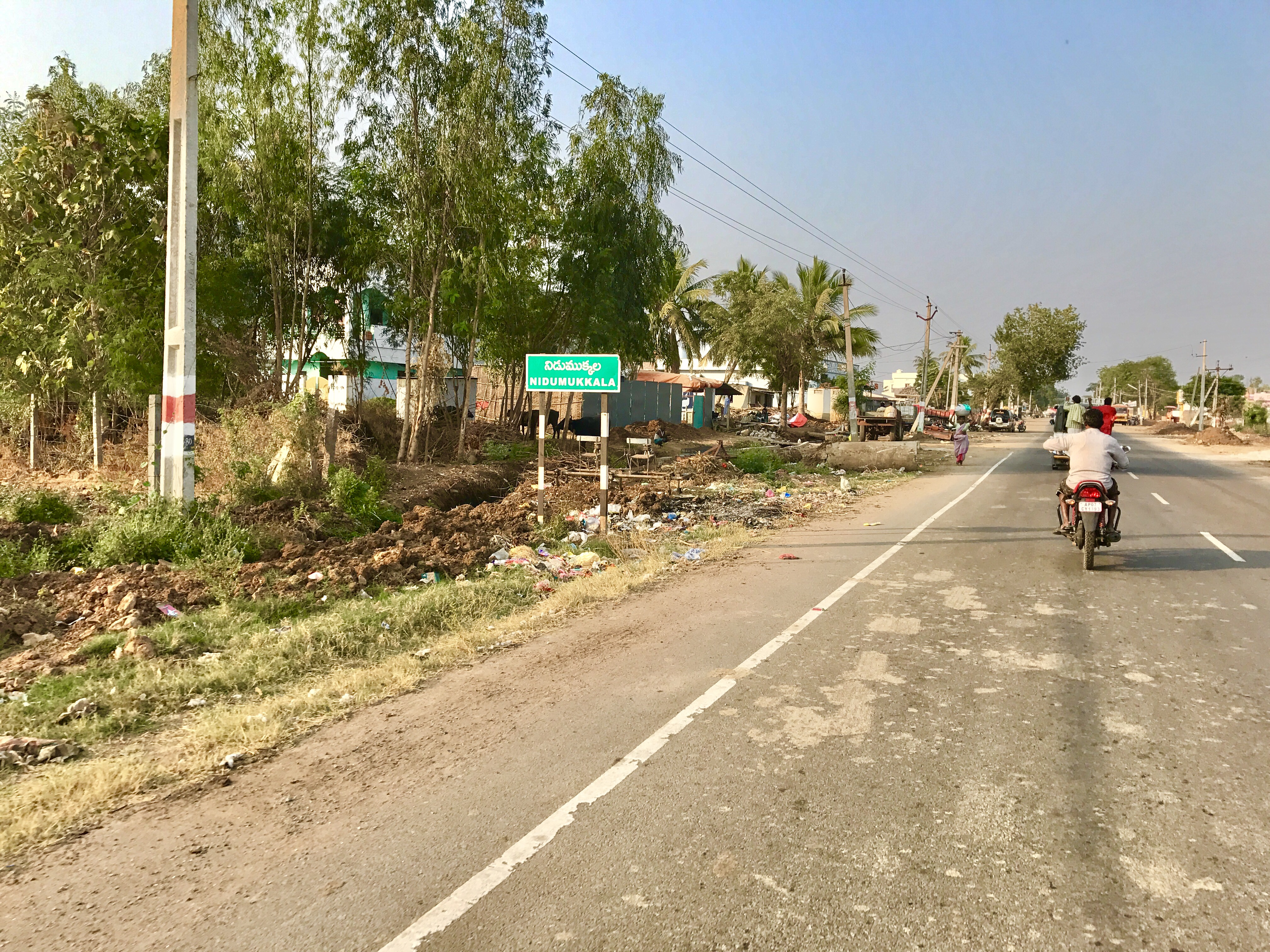
- Village inboard on Amaravati road
- Interactive map of Nidumukkala
- Location in Andhra Pradesh, India
- Coordinates: 16°26′35″N 80°24′43″E
- Country: India
- State: Andhra Pradesh
- District: Guntur
- Mandal: Tadikonda

Government
  - Type: Panchayati raj
  - Body: Nidumukkala gram panchayat
  - Sarpanch: Madasu Ratnakumari

Area
  - Total: 815 ha (2,010 acres)

Population (2011)
  - Total: 4,077
  - Density: 500/km^{2} (1,300/sq mi)

Languages
  - Official: Telugu
- Time zone: UTC+5:30 (IST)
- PIN: 522xxx
- Area code: +91–8663
- Vehicle registration: AP

Nidumukkala is a village in Guntur district of the Indian state of Andhra Pradesh. It is located in Tadikonda mandal of Guntur revenue division. It forms a part of Andhra Pradesh Capital Region.

== Demographics ==
As per census 2011 Nidumukkala has a population of 4077 of which 2005 are males while 2072 are females. Average Sex Ratio of Nidumukkala village is 1033. Child population is 418 which makes up 10.25% of total population of village with sex ratio 1000. In 2011, literacy rate of Agadallanka village was 63.60% when compared to 67.02% of Andhra Pradesh.

== Government and politics ==
Lam gram panchayat is the local self-government of the village. It is divided into wards and each ward is represented by a ward member. The ward members are headed by a Sarpanch.

== See also ==
- List of villages in Guntur district
