= Sandepudi =

- Village
- Interactive map of Sandepudi
- Location in Andhra Pradesh, India
- Coordinates: 16.09361°N 80.2472°E
- Country: India
- State: Andhra Pradesh
- District: Palnadu
- Mandal: Edlapadu

Government
  - Type: Panchayati raj
  - Body: Sandepudi gram panchayat

Area
  - Total: 362 ha (890 acres)

Population (2011)
  - Total: 1,642
  - Density: 454/km^{2} (1,170/sq mi)

Languages
  - Official: Telugu
- Time zone: UTC+5:30 (IST)
- PIN: 522619
- Area code: +91–8647
- Vehicle registration: AP

Sandepudi is a village in Palnadu district of the Indian state of Andhra Pradesh. It is located in Edlapadu mandal of Narasaraopet revenue division. It forms a part of Andhra Pradesh Capital Region.

== Geography ==
Sandepudi is situated to the south of the mandal headquarters, Edlapadu, at 16.09361°N 80.2472°E. It is spread over an area of 316 ha (780 acres).

== Demographics ==
As of 2011 Census of India, Sandepudi had a population of 1,642. The total population constitutes 825 males and 817 females —a sex ratio of 990 females per 1000 males. 111 children are in the age group of 0–6 years, of which 65 are boys and 46 are girls. The average literacy rate stands at 70.89% with 10,001 literates.

== Governance ==
Sandepudi gram panchayat is the local self-government of the village. It is divided into wards and each ward is represented by a ward member.

== Education ==
As per the school information report for the academic year 2018–19, the village has a total of 2 Zilla Parishad/Mandal Parishad school.
