= Nudurupadu =

Village in Guntur district, Andhra Pradesh, India

- Village
- Interactive map of Nudurupadu
- Location in Andhra Pradesh, India
- Coordinates: 16°16′48″N 80°12′37″E
- Country: India
- State: Andhra Pradesh
- District: Guntur
- Mandal: Phirangipuram

Government
  - Type: Panchayati raj
  - Body: Nudurupadu gram panchayat

Area
  - Total: 11.21 km^{2} (4.33 sq mi)

Population (2011)
  - Total: 3,956
  - Density: 352.9/km^{2} (914.0/sq mi)

Languages
  - Official: Telugu
- Time zone: UTC+05:30 (IST)
- PIN: 522529

Nudurupadu is a village in Guntur district in the Indian state of Andhra Pradesh. It lies in Phirangipuram mandal, within Guntur revenue division.

== Geography ==
The village covers an area of 1,121 hectares (11.21 square kilometres).

== Demographics ==
According to the 2011 census of India, Nudurupadu had a population of 3,956 in 1,141 households, comprising 1,976 males and 1,980 females. Of the total population, 432 children were aged six years or younger. There were 2,246 literate residents, giving a literacy rate of 63.73% among the population aged seven and above.

== Administration and politics ==
Nudurupadu is administered by the Nudurupadu gram panchayat. The village is part of the Andhra Pradesh Capital Region, under the jurisdiction of the Andhra Pradesh Capital Region Development Authority.

Phirangipuram mandal forms part of the Tadikonda Assembly constituency, which is reserved for Scheduled Castes and is one of seven assembly segments of the Guntur Lok Sabha constituency.

== Education ==
Government school records list a Mandal Parishad primary school and a Zilla Parishad high school in Nudurupadu. Both schools appear in the Guntur district institution list for the second phase of the state's Mana Badi Nadu Nedu school infrastructure programme.

== Economy ==
Agriculture is the primary occupation of the village. The major local crops cultivated in the region include paddy, cotton, and chillies.

== Culture and landmarks ==
The village is deeply rooted in spiritual and cultural traditions and is home to several temples dedicated to Sri Kasi Visweswara Swamy, Rama, Hanuman, Poleramma, Ganesha, Venkateswara, Ayyappa and Tirupatamma Talli. A particularly important tradition is the annual Tirunala, a village fair held at the Sri Kasi Visweswara Swamy temple following Maha Shivaratri. The celebration brings the community together each year and remains an important part of the village’s religious and cultural heritage.

== Infrastructure and amenities ==
Nudurupadu has a branch post office under the Phirangipuram sub-office, within the Narasaraopet postal division.

Local financial services are provided within the village limits. These include a branch operated by ICICI Bank and a branch of Andhra Pradesh Grameena Bank (formerly Chaitanya Godavari Grameena Bank).

== Transport ==
The village is connected by road to the mandal headquarters in Phirangipuram and the district headquarters in Guntur. State-run Andhra Pradesh State Road Transport Corporation (APSRTC) buses provide local public transit.

Nudurupadu railway station (station code: NDPU) lies on the Guntur–Guntakal railway line. It is administered by the Guntur railway division, which became part of the South Coast Railway when the zone began operations on 1 June 2026.

In December 2019, the Guntur district administration notified the acquisition of 2.30 acres (0.93 ha) of land in Nudurupadu for the second line of the Guntur–Guntakal railway doubling project.

== See also ==
- List of villages in Guntur district
