= Kondramutla =

- Village
- Interactive map of Kondramutla
- Location in Andhra Pradesh, India
- Coordinates: 16°07′N 79°45′E
- Country: India
- State: Andhra Pradesh
- District: Palnadu
- Mandal: Ipur

Government
  - Type: Panchayati raj
  - Body: Kondramutla gram panchayat

Area
  - Total: 2,837 ha (7,010 acres)

Population (2011)
  - Total: 6,215
  - Density: 219.1/km^{2} (567.4/sq mi)

Languages
  - Official: Telugu
- Time zone: UTC+5:30 (IST)
- PIN: 522647
- Area code: +91–8646
- Vehicle registration: AP

Kondramutla is a village in Palnadu district of the Indian state of Andhra Pradesh. It is located in Ipur mandal of Guntur revenue division.

== Geography ==
Kondramutla is situated to the south of the mandal headquarters, Ipur, at 16°07′N 79°45′E. It is spread over an area of 2,837 ha (7,010 acres).

== Governance ==
Kondramutla gram panchayat is the local self-government of the village. It is divided into wards and each ward is represented by a ward member.

== Education ==
As per the school information report for the academic year 2018–19, the village has 6 schools. These include 1 private and 5 Zilla/Mandal Parishad schools.
