= Takkellapadu, Guntur district =

Takkelapadu
- Village
- Interactive map of Takkelapadu
- Location in Andhra Pradesh, India
- Coordinates: 16.3110776°N 80.491047°E
- Country: India
- State: Andhra Pradesh
- District: Guntur
- Mandal: Pedakakani

Government
  - Type: Panchayati raj
  - Body: Takkellapadu gram panchayat

Area
  - Total: 1,526 ha (3,770 acres)

Population (2011)
  - Total: 7,966
  - Density: 522.0/km^{2} (1,352/sq mi)

Languages
  - Official: Telugu
- Time zone: UTC+5:30 (IST)
- PIN: 522508
- Area code: +91–863
- Vehicle registration: AP

Takkellapadu is a village in Guntur district of the Indian state of Andhra Pradesh. It is located in Pedakakani mandal of Guntur revenue division.

== Government and politics ==
Takkellapadu gram panchayat is the local self-government of the village. It is divided into wards and each ward is represented by a ward member. The ward members are headed by a Sarpanch. The village forms a part of Andhra Pradesh Capital Region and is under the jurisdiction of APCRDA.

== Education ==
As per the school information report for the academic year 2018–19, the village has a total of 8 schools. These include 5 Zilla Parishad/Mandal Parishad, one other type and 2 private schools.

== See also ==
- List of villages in Guntur district
