= Chittapuram =

- Village
- Interactive map of Chittapuram
- Location in Andhra Pradesh, India
- Coordinates: 16°12′20″N 79°49′15″E
- Country: India
- State: Andhra Pradesh
- District: Palnadu
- Mandal: Ipur

Government
  - Type: Panchayati raj
  - Body: Chittapuram gram panchayat

Area
  - Total: 1,047 ha (2,590 acres)

Population (2011)
  - Total: 2,282
  - Density: 218.0/km^{2} (564.5/sq mi)

Languages
  - Official: Telugu
- Time zone: UTC+5:30 (IST)
- PIN: 522658
- Area code: +91–8646
- Vehicle registration: AP

Chittapuram is a village in Palnadu district of the Indian state of Andhra Pradesh. It is located in Ipur mandal of Guntur revenue division.

== Geography ==
Chittapuram is situated to the southeast of the mandal headquarters, Ipur, at 16°13′09″N 79°49′40″E. It is spread over an area of 1,047 ha (2,590 acres).

== Governance ==
Chittapuram gram panchayat is the local self-government of the village. It is divided into wards and each ward is represented by a ward member.

== Education ==
As per the school information report for the academic year 2018–19, the village has 3 Mandal Parishad schools.
