= Chintalapudi =

Chintalapudi may refer to the following in Andhra Pradesh, India:

- Chintalapudi, Duggirala mandal, a village in Duggirala mandal, Guntur district
- Chintalapudi, Eluru district, a village formerly in West Godavari district
- Chintalapudi, Chandarlapadu
- Chintalapudi mandal
- Chintalapudi (SC) (Assembly constituency)
