= Pasumarru, Palnadu district =

Pasumarru
- Village
- Interactive map of Pasumarru
- Location in Andhra Pradesh, India
- Coordinates: 16.0682°N 80.1842°E
- Country: India
- State: Andhra Pradesh
- District: Palnadu
- Mandal: Chilakaluripet

Government
  - Type: Panchayati raj
  - Body: Pasumarru gram panchayat

Area
  - Rural: 2,974 km^{2} (1,148 sq mi)

Population (2011)
  - Rural: 7,165

Languages
  - Official: Telugu
- Time zone: UTC+5:30 (IST)
- PIN: 522616
- Area code: +91–863
- Vehicle registration: AP

Pasumarru is a village in PalnaduGuntur district of the Indian state of Andhra Pradesh. It is the headquarters of Chilakaluripet mandal in Narasaraopet revenue division.

== Geography ==
Pasumarru is situated to the southeast of the mandal headquarters, Purushothapatnam, at 16.068249°N 80.184205°E. It is spread over an area of 2,974 ha (7,350 acres).

== Governance ==
Pasumarru gram panchayat is the local self-government of the village. It is divided into wards and each ward is represented by a ward member.

== Education ==
As per the school information report for the academic year 2018–19, the village has a total of 6 schools. These schools include 1 private and 5 Zilla/Mandal Parishad schools.
