= Chilakaluripet mandal =

- Mandal
- Chilakaluripet H/O Purshothama Patnam
- Interactive map of Chilakaluripet mandal
- Location in Andhra Pradesh, India
- Coordinates: 16.08917°N 80.16722°E
- Country: India
- State: Andhra Pradesh
- District: Palnadu
- Headquarters: Chilakaluripet

Government
  - Body: Mandal Parishad
  - Tehsildar: P.Ch.Venkaiah

Area
  - Total: 193.66 km^{2} (74.77 sq mi)

Population (2011)
  - Total: 52,231
  - Density: 269.70/km^{2} (698.53/sq mi)

Languages
  - Official: Telugu
- Time zone: UTC+5:30 (IST)

Chilakaluripet mandal, officially designated as Chilakaluripet H/O Purshothama Patnam is one of the 28 mandals in Palnadu district of the Indian state of Andhra Pradesh. It is under the administration of Narasaraopet revenue division and the headquarters are located at Chilakaluripet city. The mandal is bounded by Nadendla, Edlapadu, Pedanandipadu and Narasaraopet mandals.

== Administration ==
The Mandal is under the control of a Tahsildar and the present tahsildar is P.Ch. Venkaiah. Chilakaluripet mandal is one of the 3 mandals under Chilakaluripet (Assembly constituency), which in turn represents Narasaraopet (Lok Sabha constituency) of Andhra Pradesh.

== Towns and villages ==
As of 2011 census, the mandal has 15 settlements. It includes 1 town and 15 villages. Chilakaluripet is a hamlet of Purshothama Patnam.

The settlements in the mandal are listed below:

1. Boppudi
2. Chinna Pasumarru
3. Edavalli
4. Gottipadu
5. Govindapuram
6. Kanthetivari Khandrika
7. Kavuru
8. Kukkapallevaripalem
9. Manukondavaripalem
10. Murikipudi
11. Pasumarru (R)
12. Pothavaram
13. Rajapeta
14. Thatapudi
15. Veluru

== See also ==
- List of mandals in Andhra Pradesh
