= Bhallukanudupalem =

- Village
- Interactive map of Bhallukanudupalem
- Location in Andhra Pradesh, India
- Coordinates: 16.080438°N 80.429967°E
- Country: India
- State: Andhra Pradesh
- District: Guntur
- Mandal: Kakumanu

Government
  - Type: Panchayati raj
  - Body: Bhallukanudupalem gram panchayat

Area
  - Total: 1,693 ha (4,180 acres)

Population (2011)
  - Total: 2,965
  - Density: 175.1/km^{2} (453.6/sq mi)

Languages
  - Official: Telugu
- Time zone: UTC+5:30 (IST)
- PIN: 522112
- Area code: +91–
- Vehicle registration: AP

Bhallukanudupalem is a village in Guntur district of the Indian state of Andhra Pradesh. It is located in Kakumanu mandal of Tenali revenue division.

== Geography ==
Bhallukanudupalem is situated to the northeast of the mandal headquarters, Kakumanu, at 16.080438°N 80.429967°E. It is spread over an area of 1,693 ha (4,180 acres).

== Governance ==
Bhallukanudupalem gram panchayat is the local self-government of the village. It is divided into wards and each ward is represented by a ward member.

== Education ==
As per the school information report for the academic year 2018–19, the village has 3 Mandal Parishad schools.

== See also ==
- List of villages in Guntur district
