= Chintalacheruvu =

- Village
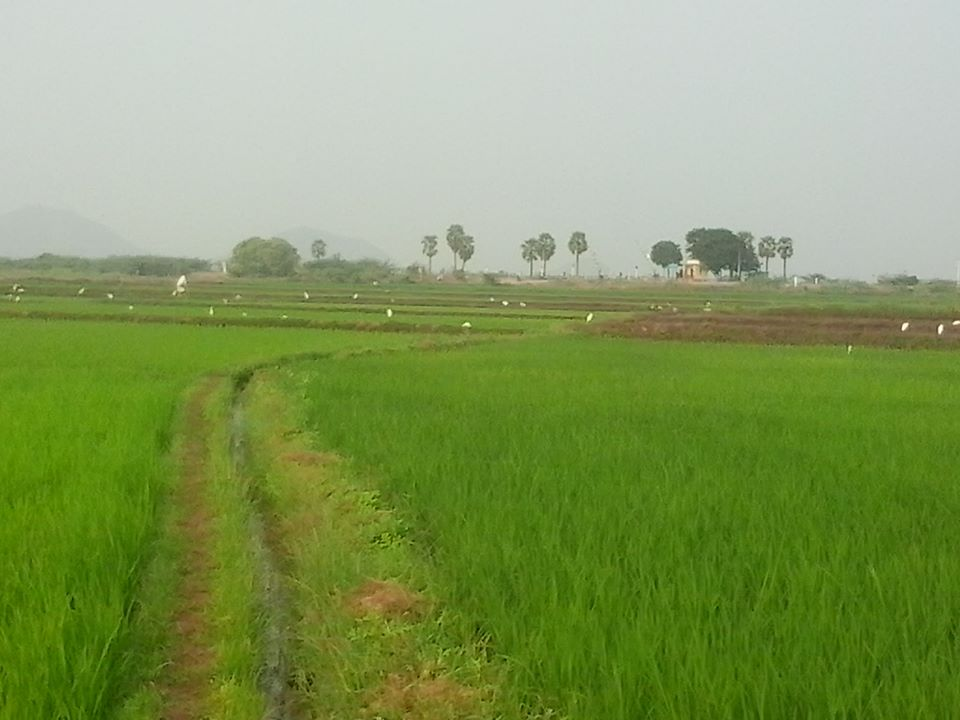
- Crop lands in village
- Interactive map of Chintalacheruvu
- Location in Andhra Pradesh, India
- Coordinates: 15°57′30″N 79°36′57.3″E
- Country: India
- State: Andhra Pradesh
- District: Palnadu
- Mandal: Nuzendla

Government
  - Type: Panchayati raj
  - Body: Chintalacheruvu gram panchayat

Area
  - Total: 2,226 ha (5,500 acres)

Population (2011)
  - Total: 3,891
  - Density: 174.8/km^{2} (452.7/sq mi)

Languages
  - Official: Telugu
- Time zone: UTC+5:30 (IST)
- PIN: 522615
- Area code: +91–8647
- Vehicle registration: AP

Chintalacheruvu is a village in Palnadu district of the Indian state of Andhra Pradesh. It is located in Nuzendla mandal of Narasaraopet revenue division.

== Geography ==
Chintalacheruvu is located at coordinates 15°57'30.0"N 79°36'57.3"E.

== Governance ==
Chintalacheruvu gram panchayat is the local self-government of the village. It is divided into wards and each ward is represented by a ward member.

== Education ==
As per the school information report for the academic year 2018–19, the village has a total of 5 Zilla Parishad/Mandal Parishad schools.
