= Kantepudi =

- Village
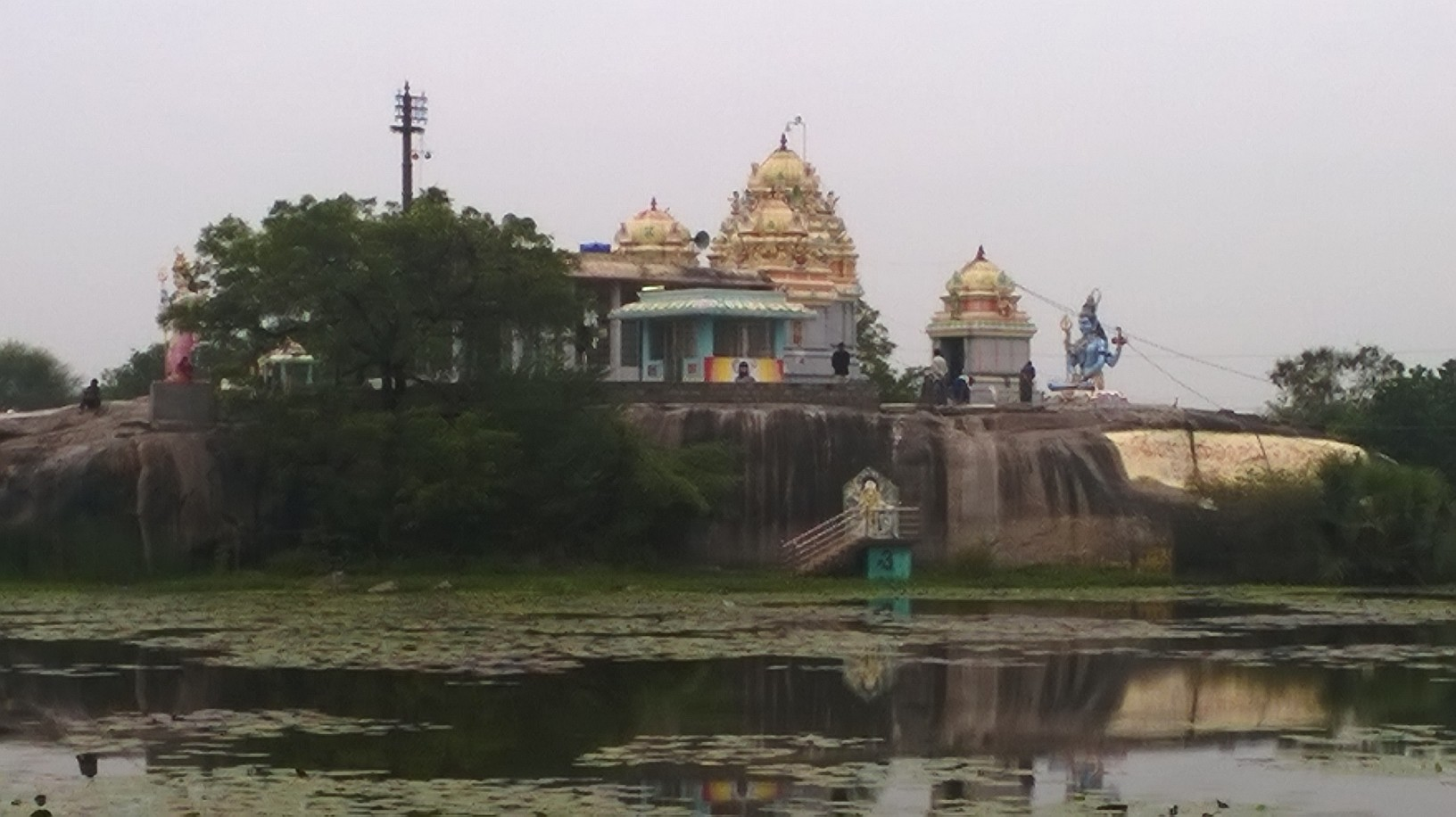
- Shiva temple in Kantepudi
- Interactive map of Kantepudi
- Location in Andhra Pradesh, India Kantepudi (India)
- Coordinates: 16.378°N 80.220°E
- Country: India
- State: Andhra Pradesh
- District: Palnadu
- Mandal: Sattenapalle

Languages
  - Official: Telugu
- Time zone: UTC+5:30 (IST)

Kantepudi is a village in Palnadu district of the Indian state of Andhra Pradesh. It is located in Sattenapalle mandal of Guntur revenue division. The village forms a part of Andhra Pradesh Capital Region and is under the jurisdiction of APCRDA.
