= Vaddemgunta =

- Village
- Interactive map of Vaddemgunta
- Location in Andhra Pradesh, India
- Country: India
- State: Andhra Pradesh
- District: Palnadu
- Mandal: Bollapalle

Government
  - Type: Panchayati raj
  - Body: Vaddemgunta Gram Panchayat

Area
  - Total: 1,691 ha (4,180 acres)

Population (2011)
  - Total: 4,246
  - Density: 251.1/km^{2} (650.3/sq mi)

Languages
  - Official: Telugu
- Time zone: UTC+5:30 (IST)
- PIN: 522xxx
- Area code: +91–
- Vehicle registration: AP

Vaddemgunta is a village in Palnadu district of the Indian state of Andhra Pradesh. It is the headquarters of Bollapalle mandal in Narasaraopet revenue division.

== Geography ==
Vaddemgunta is situated to the south of the mandal headquarters, Bhattiprolu, at 16°08′N 79°42′E. It is spread over an area of 1,691 km^{2} (653 sq mi).

== Governance ==
Vaddemgunta gram panchayat is the local self-government of the village. It is divided into wards and each ward is represented by a ward member.

== Education ==
As per the school information report for the academic year 2018–19, the village had a total of 2 MPP schools.
