= Chengizkhanpeta =

Coordinates: 33°37′13.21″N 117°42′12.5″E

- village
- Interactive map of Chengizkhanpeta
- Country: India
- State: Andhra Pradesh
- District: Palnadu
- Mandal: Edlapadu

Population
  - Total: 5,000

Languages
  - Official: Telugu
- Time zone: UTC+5:30 (IST)

Chengizkhanpeta is a village located in the Edlapadu mandal, in the Palnadu district of Andhra Pradesh, India.

== Population ==
It has a population of 5000 who are mostly engaged in agriculture.
