= Khajipalem =

- Village
- Interactive map of Khajipalem
- Location in Andhra Pradesh, India
- Coordinates: 15.9686°N 80.6054°E
- Country: India
- State: Andhra Pradesh
- District: Bapatla
- Mandal: Pittalavanipalem

Government
  - Type: Panchayati raj
  - Body: Khajipalem gram panchayat

Area
  - Total: 1,112 ha (2,750 acres)

Population (2011)
  - Total: 6,440
  - Density: 579/km^{2} (1,500/sq mi)

Languages
  - Official: Telugu
- Time zone: UTC+5:30 (IST)
- PIN: 522xxx
- Area code: +91–8641
- Vehicle registration: AP

Khajipalem is a village in Bapatla district of the Indian state of Andhra Pradesh. It is located in Pittalavanipalem mandal of Guntur revenue division.

== Government and politics ==
Khajipalem gram panchayat is the local self-government of the village. It is divided into wards and each ward is represented by a ward member. The ward members are headed by a Sarpanch.

== Education ==
As per the school information report for the academic year 2018–19, the village has a total of 13 schools. These include 9 Zilla Parishad/Mandal Parishad and 4 private schools.
