= Bollapalle =

- Village
- Interactive map of Bollapalle
- Location in Andhra Pradesh, India
- Coordinates: 16°11′40″N 79°41′16″E
- Country: India
- State: Andhra Pradesh
- District: Palnadu
- Mandal: Bollapalle

Government
  - Type: Panchayati raj
  - Body: Bollapalle gram panchayat

Area
  - Total: 1,344 ha (3,320 acres)

Population (2011)
  - Total: 4,727
  - Density: 351.7/km^{2} (910.9/sq mi)

Languages
  - Official: Telugu Urdu
- Time zone: UTC+5:30 (IST)
- PIN: 522663
- Area code: +91
- Vehicle registration: AP

Bollapalle is a village in Palnadu district of the Indian state of Andhra Pradesh. It is the headquarters of Bollapalle mandal in Narasaraopet revenue division. It is the headquarters of Bollapalle mandal.

== Geography ==
Bollapalle is situated at 16°29′32″N 80°00′32″E. It is spread over an area of 1,344 ha (3,320 acres).

== Governance ==
Bollapalle gram panchayat is the local self-government of the village. It is divided into wards and each ward is represented by a ward member.

== Education ==
As per the school information report for the academic year 2018–19, the village has a total of 13 schools. These schools include 8 Zilla Parishad / MPP, one model, one KGBV and 3 private schools.
