= Madala, Palnadu district =

Madala
- Village
- Interactive map of Madala
- Location in Andhra Pradesh, India
- Coordinates: 16.3711°N 80.1191°E
- Country: India
- State: Andhra Pradesh
- District: Palnadu
- Mandal: Muppalla

Government
  - Type: Panchayati raj
  - Body: Madala gram panchayat

Area
  - Total: 3,155 ha (7,800 acres)

Population (2011)
  - Total: 10,000
  - Density: 320/km^{2} (820/sq mi)

Languages
  - Official: Telugu
- Time zone: UTC+5:30 (IST)
- PIN: 522403
- Area code: +91–8641
- Vehicle registration: AP

Madala is a village in the Palnadu district of Andhra Pradesh. It is located in Muppalla mandal of the Guntur revenue division.

== Geography ==
Varagani is situated northeast of the mandal headquarters, Medikonduru, at 16.3711°N 80.1191°E. It is spread over an area of 3,155 ha (7,800 acres).

== Governance ==
Madala gram panchayat is the local self-government of the village. It is divided into wards and each ward is represented by a ward member.

== Education ==
As per the school information report for the academic year 2018–19, the village has 11 schools. These are 9 Zilla Parishad/MPP and 2 other types of schools.
