= Podapadu =

Podapadu is the small village in Pedakurapadu mandal in Palnadu district. It is situated 30 km away from Guntur.

== Demographics ==
The population of Podapadu is around 1000 in which 40% of the people are Mala/Madiga and 30% are Muslims and 20% are Kummari and rest of the people are from the Reddy community.
