= Sangupalem Kodur =

- Village
- Interactive map of Sangupalem Kodur
- Location in Andhra Pradesh, India
- Coordinates: 16.02913°N 80.59527°E
- Country: India
- State: Andhra Pradesh
- District: Bapatla
- Mandal: Pittalavanipalem

Government
  - Type: Panchayati raj
  - Body: Sangupalem Kodur gram panchayat

Area
  - Total: 954 ha (2,360 acres)

Population (2011)
  - Total: 2,800
  - Density: 290/km^{2} (760/sq mi)

Languages
  - Official: Telugu
- Time zone: UTC+5:30 (IST)
- PIN: 522xxx
- Area code: +91–8641
- Vehicle registration: AP

Sangupalem Kodur is a village in Bapatla district of the Indian state of Andhra Pradesh. It is located in Pittalavanipalem mandal of Guntur revenue division.

== Government and politics ==
Sangupalem Kodur gram panchayat is the local self-government of the village. It is divided into wards and each ward is represented by a ward member. The ward members are headed by a Sarpanch.

== Education ==
As per the school information report for the academic year 2018–19, the village has a total of 4 Mandal Parishad.
