= Kanaparru =

- Village
- Interactive map of Kanaparru
- Location in Andhra Pradesh, India
- Coordinates: 16.2077676°N 80.1107531°E
- Country: India
- State: Andhra Pradesh
- District: Palnadu
- Mandal: Nadendla

Government
  - Type: Panchayati raj
  - Body: Kanaparru gram panchayat

Area
  - Total: 1,213 ha (3,000 acres)

Population (2011)
  - Total: 4,098
  - Density: 337.8/km^{2} (875.0/sq mi)

Languages
  - Official: Telugu
- Time zone: UTC+5:30 (IST)
- PIN: 522549
- Area code: +91–
- Vehicle registration: AP

Kanuparru is a village in Palnadu district of the Indian state of Andhra Pradesh. It is located in Nadendla mandal of Narasaraopet revenue division.

== Demographics and climate ==
The total population of Kanaparru is 4102 . Males are 2038 and Females are 2,064 living in 960 Houses. The total area of Kanaparru is 1213 hectares. Kanaparru was built on flat land ringed by hills that are an extension of the Eastern Ghats. The summer months can get exceedingly hot, while winters are mild. Rainfall is due to the monsoon and is concentrated in the months of July-September.

== Governance ==
Kanaparru gram panchayat is the local self-government of the village. It is divided into 13 wards, and each ward is represented by a ward member.

== Education ==
As per the school information report for the academic year 2018–19, the village has a total of 10 schools. These include 5 private and 5 Zilla Parishad/MPP schools.
