= Thondapi =

- Village
- Interactive map of Thondapi
- Location in Andhra Pradesh, India
- Coordinates: 16.3008°N 80.4428°E
- Country: India
- State: Andhra Pradesh
- District: Palnadu
- Mandal: Muppalla

Government
  - Type: Panchayati raj
  - Body: Thondapi gram panchayat

Area
  - Total: 2,257 ha (5,580 acres)

Population (2011)
  - Total: 5,936
  - Density: 263.0/km^{2} (681.2/sq mi)

Languages
  - Official: Telugu
- Time zone: UTC+5:30 (IST)
- PIN: 522412
- Area code: +91–8641
- Vehicle registration: AP

Thondapi is a village in palnadu district of the Indian state of Andhra Pradesh. It is located in Muppalla mandal of sattenapalli revenue division.

== Geography ==
Varagani is situated to the northwest of the mandal headquarters, Muppalla, at 16.3008°N 80.4428°E. It is spread over an area of 2,257 ha (5,580 acres).

== Governance ==
Thondapi gram panchayat is the local self-government of the village. It is divided into wards and each ward is represented by a ward member.

== Education ==
As per the school information report for the academic year 2018–19, the village has 3 MPP schools.

== See also ==
- List of villages in palnadu district
