= Chinalingayapalem =

- village
- Nickname: palem
- Country: India
- State: Andhra Pradesh
- District: Guntur

Government
  - Body: Panchayat

Languages
  - Official: Telugu
- Time zone: UTC+5:30 (IST)
- PIN: 522124

Chinalingaya Palem is a Panchayat in Kakumanu Mandal, Guntur district of Andhra Pradesh. It is an Agricultural Village with a population of nearly 1600.

== Geography ==
Chinalingaya Palem is surrounded by the following villages: Valluru, Kondabala Vari Palem and Pandrapadu.
