= Mukkellapadu =

- Village
- Interactive map of Mukkellapadu
- Location in Andhra Pradesh, India
- Country: India
- State: Andhra Pradesh
- District: Palnadu
- Mandal: Nuzendla

Government
  - Type: Panchayati raj
  - Body: Mukkellapadu gram panchayat

Area
  - Total: 2,752 ha (6,800 acres)

Population (2011)
  - Total: 3,920
  - Density: 142/km^{2} (369/sq mi)

Languages
  - Official: Telugu
- Time zone: UTC+5:30 (IST)
- PIN: 522xxx
- Area code: +91–
- Vehicle registration: AP

Mukkellupadu is a village in Palnadu district of the Indian state of Andhra Pradesh. It is located in Nuzendla mandal of Narasaraopet revenue division.

== Governance ==
Mukkellapadu gram panchayat is the local self-government of the village. It is divided into wards and each ward is represented by a ward member.

== Education ==
As per the school information report for the academic year 2018–19, the village has a total of 6 Mandal Parishad schools.
