= Patibandla =

- Village
- పాటిబండ్ల
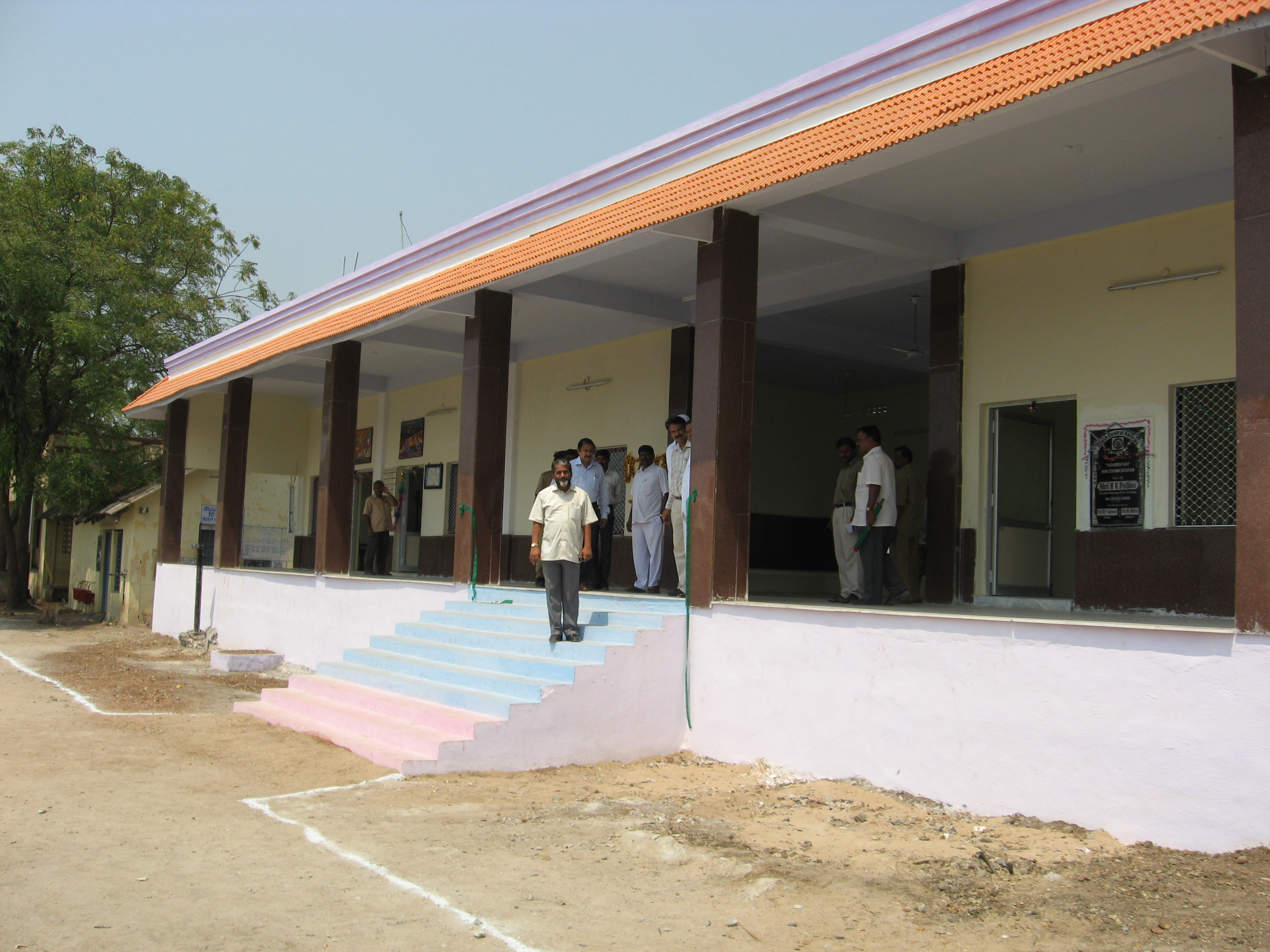
- New railway station of Pedakurapadu, Palnadu
- Interactive map of Patibandla
- Location in Andhra Pradesh, India
- Coordinates: 16.453691°N 80.303879°E
- Country: India
- State: Andhra Pradesh
- District: Palnadu
- Mandal: Pedakurapadu

Government
  - Type: Panchayati raj
  - Body: Patibandla gram panchayat

Area
  - Total: 1,399 ha (3,460 acres)

Population (2011)
  - Total: 7,062
  - Density: 504.8/km^{2} (1,307/sq mi)

Languages
  - Official: Telugu
- Time zone: UTC+5:30 (IST)
- PIN: 522436
- Area code: +91–8641
- Vehicle registration: AP

Patibandla (Telugu: పాటిబండ్ల) is a village in the Palnadu district of the Indian state of Andhra Pradesh. It is located in Pedakurapadu mandal of Sattenapalli revenue division.

== Government and politics ==
Patibandla gram panchayat is the local self-government of the village. It is divided into wards and each ward is represented by a ward member. The ward members are headed by a Sarpanch.

== Education ==
As per the school information report for the academic year 2018–19, the village has a total of 4 schools. These include one Mandal Parishad and 3 private schools.

== Education ==
It has a heritage school called RCM High School.

== Notable people ==
- Gali Bali, the present Bishop of Guntur diocese
