= Returu =

- Village
- Interactive map of Returu
- Location in Andhra Pradesh, India
- Coordinates: 16°00′20″N 80°26′27″E
- Country: India
- State: Andhra Pradesh
- District: Guntur
- Mandal: Kakumanu

Languages
  - Official: Telugu
- Time zone: UTC+5:30 (IST)
- PIN: 522113

Returu is a village in Kakumanu mandal, located in Guntur district of Andhra Pradesh, India.
