= Karuchola =

Village in Andhra Pradesh, India

- Village
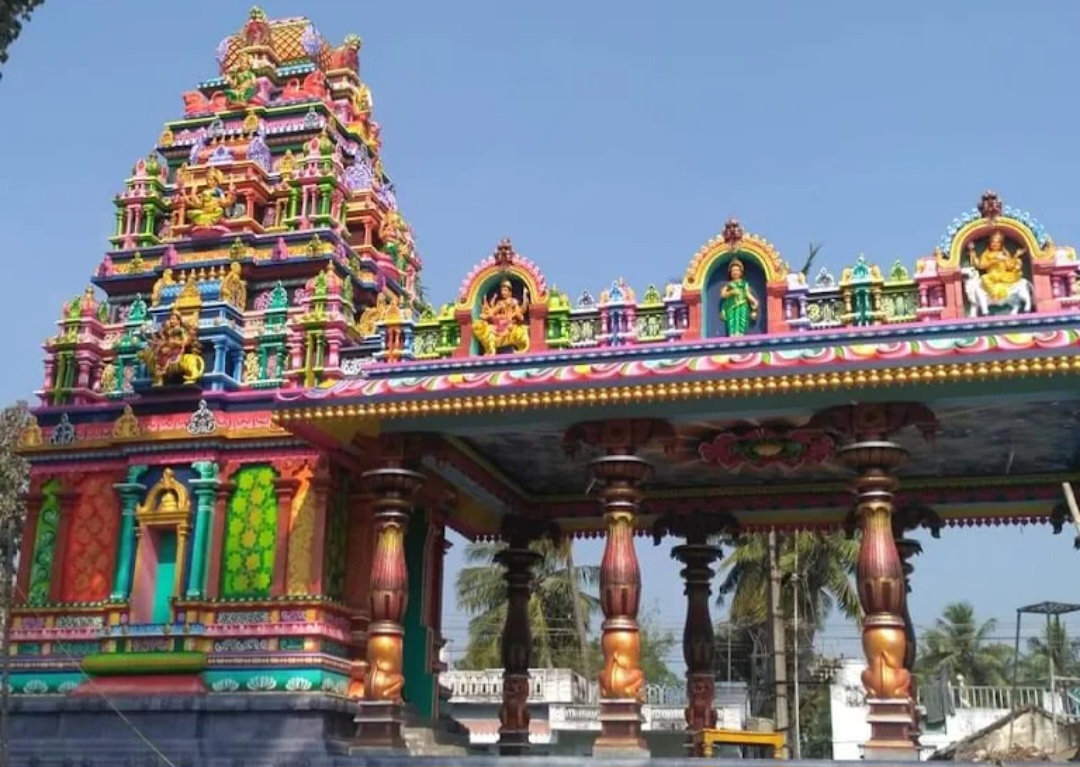
- Interactive map of Karuchola
- Location in Andhra Pradesh, India
- Coordinates: 16°09′06″N 80°15′41″E
- Country: India
- State: Andhra Pradesh
- District: Palnadu
- Mandal: Edlapadu

Government
  - Type: Panchayati raj
  - Body: Karuchola gram panchayat
  - Sarpanch: Smt. Jajula Narayanamma

Area
  - Total: .1057 km^{2} (0.0408 sq mi)

Population (2011)
  - Total: 3,424
  - Density: 318/km^{2} (820/sq mi)

Languages
  - Official: Telugu
- Time zone: UTC+5:30 (IST)
- PIN: 522233
- Area code: +91–8644
- Vehicle registration: AP

Karuchola is a village in Edlapadu mandal, Palnadu district of the Indian state of Andhra Pradesh.

== Governance ==
Karuchola Gram panchayat is the local self-government of the village. It is divided into wards and each ward is represented by a ward member. The village forms a part of Andhra Pradesh Capital Region and is under the Andhra Pradesh Capital Region Development Authority.

== Education ==
As per the Schools Information, Karuchola had three Schools including one Urdu school. All schools are under the local self-government.

== Cultural Festival ==
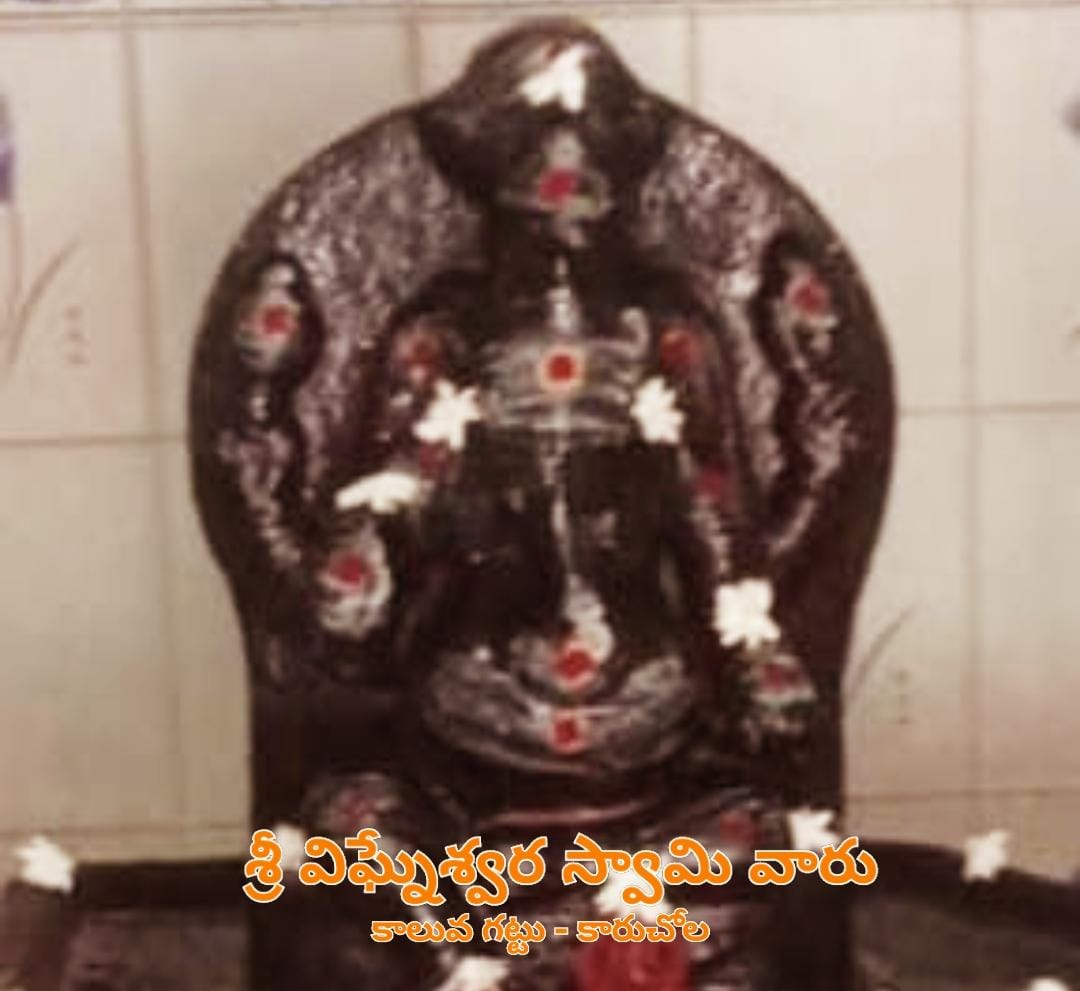
Sri Vigneswara Swamy on the Bank of Canal (Kaluva Katta)

Karuchola had Sri Vigneswara Swamy Tirunala commonly known as Karuchola-Guttavaripalem Tirunala, celebrated at Ganesh Temple on the village outskirts, exactly on the bank of small canal of Nagarjuna Sagar. It is used on auspicious days associated with religious or cultural celebration, particularly dedicated to Lord Ganesh. During Tirunala, various rituals, prayers and festivities are conducted to honor the divine.

=== About Sri Vigneswara Swamy Tirunala ===
It celebrates annually on the 7th day after Maha Shivaratri. The Tirunala was started on 9 March 1992 in the presence of Karuchola - Guttavaripalem villagers. Thereafter, It is being celebrated as the villagers common festival.

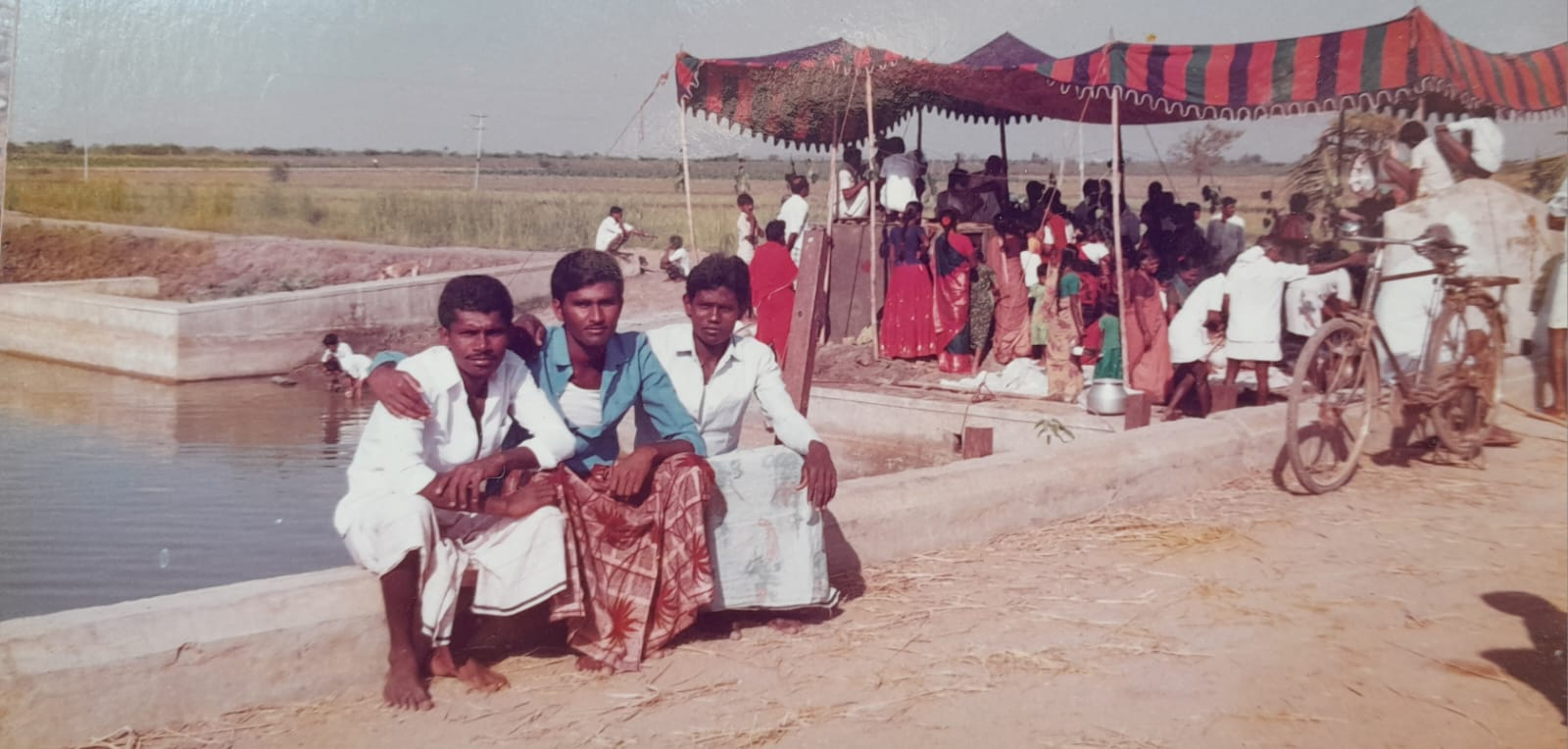
Sri Vigneswara Swamy Idol Inauguration, 1992

● Timing: It is celebrated annually on the seventh night after Maha Shivarathri.

● Features: A significant aspect of the festival is the "Electric Prabhas" (also referred to as "Currentu Prabhalu"), which are large, decorated structures.

● Devotional Aspect: The festival honors the divine, including Lord Ganesh, and involves rituals, prayers, and festivities.

● Location: Karuchola-Guttavaripalem Village, Edlapadu Mandal, Palnadu district, Andhra Pradesh

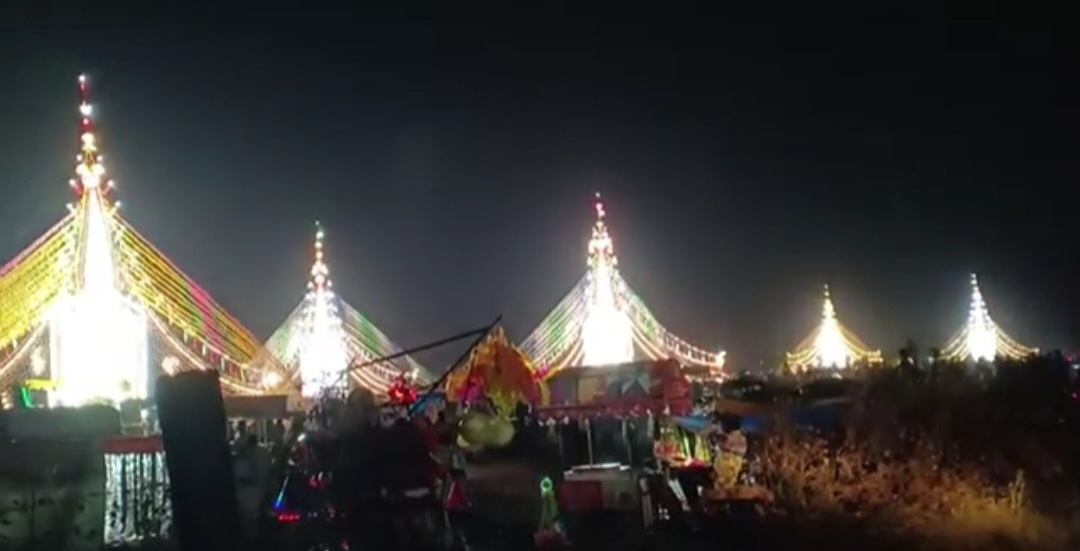
Currentu Prabhalu, Karuchola - Guttavaripalem in February 2023

== Places of worship ==
Name	Religion
Sri Kodanda Ram Temple	Hinduism
Sri Sivalayam Temple	Hinduism
Sri Anjaneya Swamy Temple	Hinduism
Sri Chennakesava Swamy Temple	Hinduism
Sri Brahmmam Gari Temple	Hinduism
Sri Vigneswara Swamy Temple	Hinduism
Smt Nagarappamma Temple	Hinduism
Smt Poleramma Temple	Hinduism
Masjid	Islam
Christ Luthern Church	Christianity
RCM Church	Christianity
