= Sarikondapalem =

- Village
- Interactive map of Sarikondapalem
- Location in Andhra Pradesh, India
- Country: India
- State: Andhra Pradesh
- District: Palnadu
- Mandal: Bollapalle

Government
  - Type: Panchayati raj
  - Body: Sarikondapalem gram panchayat

Area
  - Total: 896 ha (2,210 acres)

Population (2011)
  - Total: 1,806
  - Density: 202/km^{2} (522/sq mi)

Languages
  - Official: Telugu
- Time zone: UTC+5:30 (IST)
- PIN: 522xxx
- Area code: +91–
- Vehicle registration: AP

Sarikondapalem is a village in Palnadu district of the Indian state of Andhra Pradesh. It is the headquarters of Bollapalle mandal in Narasaraopet revenue division.

== Geography ==
Sarikondapalem is situated to the south of the mandal headquarters, Bollapalli, at 16°07′N 79°41′E. It is spread over an area of 896 ha (2,210 acres).

== Governance ==
Sarikondapalem gram panchayat is the local self-government of the village. It is divided into wards and each ward is represented by a ward member.

== Education ==
As per the school information report for the academic year 2018–19, the village has a total of 3 MPP schools.
