= Thummalacheruvu =

- Village
- Interactive map of Thummalacheruvu
- Location in Andhra Pradesh, India
- Country: India
- State: Andhra Pradesh
- District: Palnadu
- Mandal: Piduguralla

Government
  - Type: Panchayati raj
  - Body: Thummalacheruvu gram panchayat

Area
  - Total: 2,578 ha (6,370 acres)

Population (2011)
  - Total: 8,889
  - Density: 344.8/km^{2} (893.0/sq mi)

Languages
  - Official: Telugu
- Time zone: UTC+5:30 (IST)
- PIN: 522xxx
- Area code: +91–8641
- Vehicle registration: AP

Thummalacheruvu is a village in Palnadu district of the Indian state of Andhra Pradesh. It is located in Piduguralla mandal of Guntur revenue division.

The village is well connected by road through the Narketpally–Addanki State Highway. The district headquarters is Narasaraopeta.

== Government and Politics ==
Thummalacheruvu gram panchayat is the local self-government of the village. It is divided into wards and each ward is represented by a ward member. The ward members are headed by a Sarpanch.

The village has facilities such as a Sachivalayam and a Raithu Bharosa Kendram. The current MLA is Yarapatineni Srinivasarao, who succeeded Kasu Mahesh Reddy.

== Transport ==
Tummalacheruvu railway station, situated on the Nallapadu-Pagidipalli section, serves the village with rail connectivity.

The village is served by the Macherla–Vijayawada MEMU train, with the local railway station functioning as a halt station. APSRTC bus services and private share auto services are available from the nearest town, Piduguralla, for travelers coming from Guntur or Narasaraopeta. Piduguralla is located approximately 12 km from the village. Travellers coming from Hyderabad or Miryalaguda may request a stop at the Toll plaza located on the highway.

The village is having Postal services and a post office situated opposite to Government primary high school.

== Education ==
As per the school information report for the academic year 2018–19, the village has a total of 6 schools. These include 5 Zilla Parishad/Mandal Parishad and one private schools.

== Hindu Temples ==
1. Panduranga Swami Temple
2. Venugopala Swami Temple
3. Anjaneya Swami Temple
4. Sivalayam Temple ( newly constructed and housing multiple deities)
5. Poleramma talli Temple
6. Ramalayam
7. Bala Nagaendra swami Temple ( Naga devatha / Putta )
8. Gangamma talli Temple
9. Mahalakshmi Temple
10. Bramham gaari Temple
11. Neelampati amma vari Temple

== Banking ==
The village has a branch of the State Bank of India, which includes a 24-hour ATM facility.

== Hospital ==
Healthcare facilities include one government hospital and five RMP clinics. The nearest PHC is in Karalapadu, about 4 km from the village.

For Animals, The Verternary hospital is available located next to Poleramma talli temple.
