= Jalalpuram =

- Village
- Interactive map of Jalalpuram
- Location in Andhra Pradesh, India
- Coordinates: 16.484541°N 80.302958°E
- Country: India
- State: Andhra Pradesh
- District: Palnadu
- Mandal: Pedakurapadu

Government
  - Type: Panchayati raj
  - Body: Jalalpuram gram panchayat

Area
  - Total: 537 ha (1,330 acres)

Population (2011)
  - Total: 1,908
  - Density: 355/km^{2} (920/sq mi)

Languages
  - Official: Telugu
- Time zone: UTC+5:30 (IST)
- PIN: 522436
- Area code: +91–8641
- Vehicle registration: AP

Jalapuram is a village in the Palnadu district of the Indian state of Andhra Pradesh. It is located in Pedakurapadu mandal of Sattenapalli revenue division.

== Government and politics ==
Jalalpuram gram panchayat is the local self-government of the village. It is divided into wards and each ward is represented by a ward member. The ward members are headed by a Sarpanch. The village forms a part of Andhra Pradesh Capital Region and is under the jurisdiction of APCRDA.

== Education ==
As per the school information report for the academic year 2018–19, the village has a total of one Mandal Parishad school.
