= Dammalapadu =

- Village
- Interactive map of Dammalapadu
- Location in Andhra Pradesh, India
- Coordinates: 16.3567874°N 80.0632713°E
- Country: India
- State: Andhra Pradesh
- District: Palnadu
- Mandal: Muppalla

Government
  - Type: Panchayati raj
  - Body: Dammalapadu gram panchayat
  - Sarpanch: Burla.Ramesh

Area
  - Total: 2,061 ha (5,090 acres)

Population (2011)
  - Total: 5,362
  - Density: 260.2/km^{2} (673.8/sq mi)

Languages
  - Official: Telugu
- Time zone: UTC+5:30 (IST)
- PIN: 522408
- Area code: +91–8641
- Vehicle registration: AP

Dammalapadu is a village in Palnadu district of the Indian state of Andhra Pradesh. It is located in Muppalla mandal of Guntur revenue division.

== Governance ==
Dammalapadu gram panchayat is the local self-government of the village. It is divided into wards and each ward is represented by a ward member.

== Education ==
As per the school information report for the academic year 2018–19, the village has 6 schools. These are 4 MPP and 2 private schools.
