= Manduru, Bapatla district =

Manduru
- Village
- Interactive map of Manduru
- Location in Andhra Pradesh, India
- Coordinates: 16.1641°N 80.6376°E
- Country: India
- State: Andhra Pradesh
- District: Bapatla

Area
  - Total: 7.22 km^{2} (2.79 sq mi)

Population (2011)
  - Total: 2,632
  - Density: 365/km^{2} (944/sq mi)

Languages
  - Official: Telugu
- Time zone: UTC+5:30 (IST)

Manduru is a village in Bapatla district of the Indian state of Andhra Pradesh. It is located in Tsundur mandal of Tenali revenue division.

== See also ==
- Villages in Tsundur mandal
