= Lakkarajugarlapadu =

- Village
- Interactive map of Lakkarajugarlapadu
- Location in Andhra Pradesh, India
- Coordinates: 16.52°N 79.74°E
- Country: India
- State: Andhra Pradesh
- District: Palnadu
- Mandal: Sattenapalle

Government
  - Type: Panchayati raj
  - Body: Lakkarajugarlapadu gram panchayat

Area
  - Total: 1,412 ha (3,490 acres)

Population (2011)
  - Total: 4,299
  - Density: 304.5/km^{2} (788.6/sq mi)

Languages
  - Official: Telugu
- Time zone: UTC+5:30 (IST)
- PIN: 522403
- Area code: +91–
- Vehicle registration: AP

Lakkaraju Garlapadu is a village in Palnadu district of the Indian state of Andhra Pradesh. It is located in Sattenapalle mandal of Guntur revenue division.

== Geography ==
Lakkaraju Garlapadu is located at coordinates:16°52'78"N 79°74'98"E geographically.

== Demography ==
Telugu is the local language. The village of Lakkaraju Garlapadu covers an area of about 1682 hectares. As of 2011 India census, Lakkaraju Garlapadu had a population of 4203, with 2075 men and 2128 women living in 947 houses. The village is known for the Ramalayam and Poleramma temples.

== Governance ==
Lakkaraju Garlapadu gram panchayat is the local self-government of the village. It is divided into wards and each ward is represented by a ward member. The elected members of the gram panchayat is headed by a sarpanch. The village forms a part of Andhra Pradesh Capital Region and is under the jurisdiction of APCRDA.
