= Chintalapudi, Duggirala mandal =

Chintalapudi
- Village
- Interactive map of Chintalapudi
- Location in Andhra Pradesh, India
- Coordinates: 16.3053323°N 80.633533°E
- Country: India
- State: Andhra Pradesh
- District: Guntur
- Mandal: Duggirala

Government
  - Type: Panchayati raj
  - Body: Chintalapudi gram panchayat

Area
  - Total: 375 ha (930 acres)

Population (2011)
  - Total: 1,613
  - Density: 430/km^{2} (1,110/sq mi)

Languages
  - Official: Telugu
- Time zone: UTC+5:30 (IST)
- PIN: 522xxx
- Area code: +91–8644
- Vehicle registration: AP

Chintalapudi is a village in Guntur district of the Indian state of Andhra Pradesh. It is located in Duggirala mandal of Tenali revenue division. The village forms a part of Andhra Pradesh Capital Region and is under the jurisdiction of APCRDA.

== Geography ==
Chintalapudi is situated to the northeast of the mandal headquarters, Duggirala, at 16.3053323°N 80.633533°E. It is spread over an area of 375 ha (930 acres).

== Government and politics ==
Chintalapudi gram panchayat is the local self-government of the village. It is divided into wards and each ward is represented by a ward member.

== Education ==
As per the school information report for the academic year 2018–19, the village has only one MPP.

== See also ==
- List of villages in Guntur district
