= Somasundara Palem =

- Interactive map of Somasundara Palem
- Location in India Somasundara Palem (India)
- Coordinates: 16.264324°N 80.640335°E
- Country: India

Languages
- Time zone: UTC+5:30 (IST)

Samasundara Palem is a village in Guntur district of Andhra Pradesh.
