= Bhrugubanda =

- Village
- Interactive map of Bhrugubanda
- Location in Andhra Pradesh, India
- Coordinates: 16.451944°N 80.094167°E
- Country: India
- State: Andhra Pradesh
- District: Palnadu
- Mandal: Sattenapalle

Government
  - Type: Panchayati raj
  - Body: Bhrugubanda gram panchayat

Area
  - Total: 2,051 ha (5,070 acres)

Population (2011)
  - Total: 5,479
  - Density: 267.1/km^{2} (691.9/sq mi)

Languages
  - Official: Telugu
- Time zone: UTC+5:30 (IST)
- PIN: 522xxx
- Area code: +91–8640
- Vehicle registration: AP

Bhrugubanda is a village in Palnadu district of Indian state of Andhra Pradesh. It is located in Sattenapalle mandal of Palnadu district. It forms a part of Andhra Pradesh Capital Region.

== Governance ==
Bhrugubanda gram panchayat is the local self-government of the village. It is divided into wards and each ward is represented by a ward member. The elected members of the gram panchayat is headed by a sarpanch.
