= Konakanchi Vari Palem =

- Village
- Country: India
- State: Andhra Pradesh
- District: Palnadu

Languages
  - Official: Telugu
- Time zone: UTC+5:30 (IST)

Konakanchivaripalem is a small Gram panchayat in Rompicherla mandal of Palnadu district in Andhra Pradesh, India.
