= Munipally =

Village in Telangana, India

Munipally or Munpally is a village in Jakranpally Mandal in Nizamabad district in the state of Telangana in India. It is known for its agriculture. The main crops are Pasupu, rice and all kinds of vegetables. Munipally is situated on NH 16 (Nizamabad-Jagdalpur). The nearest city is Hyderabad.
