= Gopichettipalle =

Village in Andhra Pradesh, India

- Village
- Interactive map of Gopichettipalle
- Location in Andhra Pradesh, India
- Country: India
- State: Andhra Pradesh
- District: Chittoor
- Mandal: Karvetinagar

Population (2011)
  - Total: 1,706

Languages
  - Official: Telugu
- Time zone: UTC+5:30 (IST)

Gopichettipalle is a village in Chittoor district of the Indian state of Andhra Pradesh. It is located in Karvetinagar mandal.Gopichettipalle village situated exactly at Andhrapradesh and Tamil Nadu Border.

As of 2011, Gopichettipalle's population was 1,706, with 49% males and 51% females. The literacy rate was 65.5%.
