= Gottimukkala =

- Village
- Interactive map of Gottimukkala
- Location in Andhra Pradesh, India
- Coordinates: 16°38′19″N 79°34′00″E
- Country: India
- State: Andhra Pradesh
- District: Palnadu
- Mandal: Gottimukkala

Government
  - Type: Panchayati raj
  - Body: Gottimukkala gram panchayat

Area
  - Total: 2,399 ha (5,930 acres)

Population (2011)
  - Total: 2,811
  - Density: 117.2/km^{2} (303.5/sq mi)

Languages
  - Official: Telugu
- Time zone: UTC+5:30 (IST)
- PIN: 522615
- Area code: +91–863
- Vehicle registration: AP

Gottimukkala is a village in Palnadu district of the Indian state of Andhra Pradesh. It is located in Gurazala mandal of Gurazala revenue division.

== Geography ==
Gottimukkala is situated to the south of the mandal headquarters, Gurazala, at 16.555687°N 79.636174°E. It is spread over an area of 2,399 ha (5,930 acres).

== Governance ==
Gottimukkala gram panchayat is the local self-government of the village.

== Education ==
As per the school information report for the academic year 2018–19, the village has 2 Zilla/Mandal Parishad schools.
