= Pothumarru =

- Village
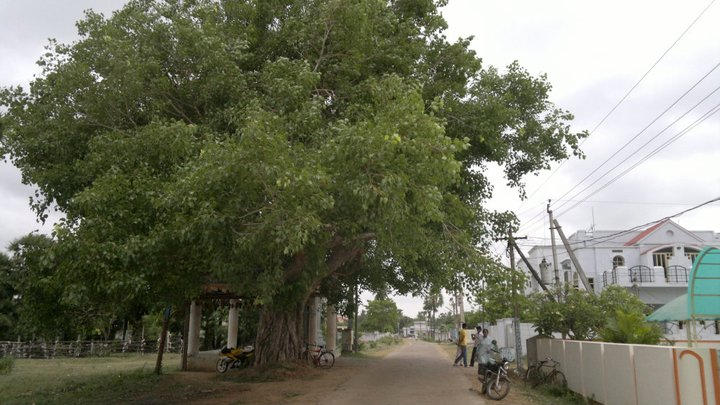
- A 300-year-old Holy Fig tree Pothumarru village
- Interactive map of Pothumarru
- Location in Andhra Pradesh, India
- Coordinates: 16°30′N 81°18′E
- Country: India
- State: Andhra Pradesh
- District: Eluru

Government
  - Type: Democratic
  - Body: Panchayatraj

Area
  - Total: 10.15 km^{2} (3.92 sq mi)
- Elevation: 57 m (187 ft)

Population (2011)
  - Total: 3,781
  - Density: 372.5/km^{2} (964.8/sq mi)

Languages
  - Official: Telugu
- Time zone: UTC+5:30 (IST)
- Postal code: 521121
- Area code: +91-8671
- Vehicle registration: AP
- Lok Sabha constituency: Machilipatnam

Pothumarru is a village in Kalidindi mandal, located in Eluru district of the Indian state of Andhra Pradesh.

== Geography ==
Pothumarru is located at 16°31'46"N 81°18'46"E.
