= Kuchellapadu =

Village in Andhra Pradesh, India

Kuchellapadu is a village in the Bapatla district of the Indian state of Andhra Pradesh. It is located in Vemuru mandal of Tenali revenue division, 12 km from the mandal and division headquarters of Tenali.
