= Thotlapalem =

- Village
- Interactive map of Thotlapalem
- Location in Andhra Pradesh, India
- Coordinates: 16°10′51″N 80°33′33″E
- Country: India
- State: Andhra Pradesh
- District: Guntur
- Mandal: Chebrolu

Population (2015)
  - Total: 550

Languages
  - Official: Telugu
- Time zone: UTC+5:30 (IST)
- PIN: 522212

Thotlapalem is a village in Guntur district of the Indian state of Andhra Pradesh. It is located in Chebrolu mandal of Tenali revenue division.
