= Jangamaheswara puram =

- Suburb of Gurazala
- Nickname: J.m.puram
- Interactive map of Jangamaheswara puram
- Location in Andhra Pradesh, India
- Coordinates: 16.538057°N 79.640193°E
- Country: India
- State: Andhra Pradesh
- District: Gurazala Mandal; Palnadu
- Elevation: 146 m (479 ft)

Languages
  - Official: Telugu
- Time zone: UTC+5:30 (IST)
- PIN: 522415
- Telephone code: 08649
- Vehicle registration: 9

Jangamaheswara puram is a Suburb of Gurazala and is administered under the body of Gurazala Nagar panchayat, located in Gurazala Mandal, Palnadu District, Andhra Pradesh, India. In 2023, the village recorded top temparatures in the AP State.

== Schools ==
- Jilla Parishath Unnatha Paatashala
- Mandala Parishath Prathamika Paatashala

== Temples ==
- Sri Palnati Venkateswara swami temple
- Sri Anjeneya swami Temple
- shivalayam
- Ramulavari gudi
- Alivelu mangaswami temple
- Thirupatamma Temple
- Poleramma Temple
- Veera Bramhendra Swami Temple
- Mallalamma Temple
- Palnati Yadadri Sri Lakshmi Narasimha Swamy vari Temple
