= Vemuluripadu =

Village in Andhra Pradesh, India

Coordinates: 16.303232°N 80.291862°E

Vemuluripadu is a village in Phirangipuram mandal, Guntur district of Andhra Pradesh, India.
