= Gogulapadu =

- Village
- Interactive map of Gogulapadu
- Location in Andhra Pradesh, India
- Coordinates: 16.58°N 79.57°E
- Country: India
- State: Andhra Pradesh
- District: Palnadu
- Mandal: Gurazala

Government
  - Type: Panchayati raj
  - Body: Gogulapadu gram panchayat

Area
  - Total: 1,254 ha (3,100 acres)

Population (2011)
  - Total: 3,026
  - Density: 241.3/km^{2} (625.0/sq mi)

Languages
  - Official: Telugu
- Time zone: UTC+5:30 (IST)
- PIN: 522615
- Area code: +91–863
- Vehicle registration: AP

Gogulapadu is a village in Palnadu district of the Indian state of Andhra Pradesh. It is located in Gurazala mandal of Gurazala revenue division.

== History ==
The famous battle Palnati Yudhdham (War of Palnadu) took place between Gurazala and Macherla between 1176 AD – 1182 AD at Karempudi (Yuddabhoomi).

== Geography ==
Gogulapadu is situated to the east of the mandal headquarters, Gurazala, at 16.58°N 79.57°E. It is spread over an area of 3,026 ha (7,480 acres).

== Governance ==
Gogulapadu gram panchayat is the local self-government of the village.

== Education ==
As per the school information report for the academic year 2018–19, the village has 2 Zilla/Mandal Parishad schools.
