= Mittagudipadu =

- Village
- Interactive map of Mittagudipadu
- Location in Andhra Pradesh, India
- Coordinates: 16.5697324°N 79.5392686°E
- Country: India
- State: Andhra Pradesh
- District: Palnadu
- Mandal: Rentachintala

Government
  - Type: Panchayati raj
  - Body: Manchikallu gram panchayat

Area
  - Total: 1,272 ha (3,140 acres)

Population (2011)
  - Total: 1,746
  - Density: 137.3/km^{2} (355.5/sq mi)

Languages
  - Official: Telugu
- Time zone: UTC+5:30 (IST)
- PIN: 522421
- Area code: +91–8642
- Vehicle registration: AP

Mittagudipadu is a village in Palnadu district of the Indian state of Andhra Pradesh. It is located in Rentachintala mandal of Gurazala revenue division.

== Etymology ==
The name Mittagudipadu is said to have originated from Metta(Old), Gudi(Temple). The village is named due to the reason of very Olden Temples.

== Geography and climate ==
Mittagudipadu is located near latitude 16.55 N and longitude 79.55 E. The village lies in the Krishna River plains, having an elevation of 130 metres (430 ft) above sea level. The nearest large water body is the Nagarjuna Sagar lake, about 25 kilometres (16 mi) west of Rentachintala.

Mittagudipadu has a Tropical wet and dry climate. The highest temperatures are experienced in the month of May, when the summer season is at its peak. The maximum temperature averages more than 40 degrees, occasionally reaching as high as 45 degrees. The highest temperature ever recorded is 52 degrees Celsius in 2012. Winters are pleasant, with occasional spells of rain from the northwest monsoon.

Climate data for Mittagudipadu
Month	Jan	Feb	Mar	Apr	May	Jun	Jul	Aug	Sep	Oct	Nov	Dec	Year
Record high °C (°F)	37.4 (99.3)	40.6 (105.1)	44.4 (111.9)	46.6 (115.9)	48.3 (118.9)	47.2 (117.0)	42.2 (108.0)	40.1 (104.2)	42.1 (107.8)	41.0 (105.8)	36.1 (97.0)	35.6 (96.1)	48.3 (118.9)
Record low °C (°F)	10.1 (50.2)	9.4 (48.9)	15.0 (59.0)	14.7 (58.5)	18.3 (64.9)	20.0 (68.0)	19.3 (66.7)	16.5 (61.7)	18.9 (66.0)	16.0 (60.8)	12.2 (54.0)	10.0 (50.0)	9.4 (48.9)
Source: India Meteorological Department

== Demographics ==
As per the latest 2016 Census of India, Mittagudipadu has a total population of nearly 5,000. Males constitute 51% and females constitute 49% of the population. The literacy in Mittagudipadu is 75.46%, lower than the national average of 74.04%. Male literacy is at 63.33% and female literacy is at 47.27%. Less than 1% of the population at Mittagudipadu is below 6 years of age.

== Government and politics ==
Mittagudipadu gram panchayat is the local self-government of the village. It is divided into wards and each ward is represented by a ward member. The ward members are headed by a Sarpanch.
