= Rompicherla, Palnadu district =

Rompicherla
- Village
- Interactive map of Rompicherla
- Location in Andhra Pradesh, India
- Coordinates: 16.209981°N 79.908729°E
- Country: India
- State: Andhra Pradesh
- District: Palnadu
- Mandal: Rompicherla

Government
  - Type: Panchayati raj
  - Body: Rompicherla gram panchayat

Area
  - Total: 2,811 ha (6,950 acres)

Population (2011)
  - Total: 10,131
  - Density: 360.4/km^{2} (933.4/sq mi)

Languages
  - Official: Telugu
- Time zone: UTC+5:30 (IST)
- PIN: 522xxx
- Area code: +91–
- Vehicle registration: AP

[Sarpanch] Gelli China Koti Reddy

Rompicherla is a village in Palnadu district of the Indian state of Andhra Pradesh. It is the headquarters of Rompicherla mandal in Narasaraopet revenue division.

== Government and politics ==
Rompicherla gram panchayat is the local self-government of the village. It is divided into wards and each ward is represented by a ward member. The ward members are headed by a Sarpanch. [Sarpanch] Gelli China Koti Reddy
