= Jammalamadaka =

Coordinates: 15°17′N 79°24′E

Jammalamadaka is a village in the Macherla mandal in the Palnadu district of Andhra Pradesh in India. It is located towards west from District headquarters.
