= Ganesuni Vari Palem =

- village
- Interactive map of Ganesuni Vari Palem
- Location in Andhra Pradesh, India Ganesuni Vari Palem (India)
- Coordinates: 16°6′11″N 80°14′27″E
- Country: India
- State: Andhra Pradesh
- District: Palnadu

Languages
  - Official: Telugu
- Time zone: UTC+5:30 (IST)

Ganesuni Vari Palem is a village in Chilakaluripet municipality, Edlapadu Mandal, Palnadu district, Andhra Pradesh, India.
