= Rayaprolu =

Rayaprolu Rayapudi
- Village
- Interactive map of Rayaprolu
- Location in Andhra Pradesh, India
- Coordinates: 15.965783°N 80.498215°E
- Country: India
- State: Andhra Pradesh
- District: Guntur

Languages
  - Official: Telugu
- Time zone: UTC+5:30 (IST)

Rayaprolu is a village in Kakumanu mandal, located in Guntur district of Andhra Pradesh, India.
