= Cherlagudipadu =

- Village
- Interactive map of Cherlagudipadu
- Location in Andhra Pradesh, India
- Coordinates: 16°30′14″N 79°38′35″E
- Country: India
- State: Andhra Pradesh
- District: Palnadu
- Mandal: Gurazala

Government
  - Type: Panchayati raj
  - Body: Cherlagudipadu gram panchayat

Area
  - Total: 2,233 ha (5,520 acres)

Population (2011)
  - Total: 5,530
  - Density: 248/km^{2} (641/sq mi)

Languages
  - Official: Telugu
- Time zone: UTC+5:30 (IST)
- PIN: 522415
- Area code: +91–8649
- Vehicle registration: AP

Cherlagudipadu is a village in Palnadu district of the Indian state of Andhra Pradesh. It is located in Gurazala mandal of Gurazala revenue division.

== Geography ==
Cherlagudipadu is situated to the south of the mandal headquarters, Gurazala, at 16°30′14″N 79°38′35″E. It is spread over an area of 2,233 ha (5,520 acres).

== Governance ==
Cherlagudipadu gram panchayat is the local self-government of the village. It is divided into wards and each ward is represented by a ward member.

== Education ==
As per the school information report for the academic year 2018–19, the village has a total of 3 Zilla/Mandal Parishad schools.
