= Vinjanampadu, Guntur district =

Vinjanampadu
- Interactive map of Vinjanampadu
- Location in Andhra Pradesh, India
- Coordinates: 16.23888°N 80.426669°E
- Country: India
- State: Andhra Pradesh
- District: Guntur
- Mandal: Vatticherukuru
- Founder: ELURI's & NARNE's

Government
  - Body: Telugu Desam Party
- Elevation: 24 m (79 ft)

Population (2011)
  - Total: 1,053

Languages
  - Official: Telugu
- Time zone: UTC+05:30 (IST)

Vinjanampadu is a village in Guntur district of Andhra Pradesh, India.
