= Nadimpalle =

- Village
- Interactive map of Nadimpalle
- Location in Andhra Pradesh, India
- Coordinates: 16.0667872°N 80.7137338°E
- Country: India
- State: Andhra Pradesh
- District: Bapatla
- Mandal: Cherukupalle

Government
  - Type: Panchayati raj
  - Body: Nadimpalle gram panchayat

Area
  - Total: 520 ha (1,300 acres)

Population (2011)
  - Total: 2,653
  - Density: 510/km^{2} (1,300/sq mi)

Languages
  - Official: Telugu
- Time zone: UTC+5:30 (IST)
- PIN: 522259
- Area code: +91–8644
- Vehicle registration: AP

Nadimpalle is a village in Bapatla district of the Indian state of Andhra Pradesh. It is the located in Cherukupalle mandal of Tenali revenue division.

== Etymology ==
According Nadimpalli village kaifiyat (available in Village Kaifiyats of Guntur Vol-5) the name seems to have come from location of village lying in between Gudavalli and Ponnapalli. Naduma in Telugu means middle/ in between. Since the village lies in between the above villages it got the name Nadimpalli

== History ==
As per village kaifiyat, this village existed as far back as 1141 AD. The same fact was supported by village kaifiyats of Gudavalli, panchalavaram as well.

As per village kaifiyat during 12th century the village was given as Mirasi (karanikam/inam) to certain Brahmins by Goparaju Ramanna the then prime minister to King Ganapati of Gajapathi dynasty

The kaifiyat also states there were some dilapidated shiva temple in the village and the pond east of it was called Kanchara Gutta as it was excavated by certain person named Kanchara

Mahasivaratri used to be celebrated in Saileswaraswamy temple for one day on Magha Bahula Chaturdasi (Jan-Feb)

== Geography ==
Nadimpalle is situated to the northwest of the mandal headquarters, Arumbaka, at 16.0667872°N 80.7137338°E. It is spread over an area of 520 ha (1,300 acres).

== Demographics ==
The village is home to 2,653 people with 808 households. The population consists of 12% schedule castes and 0% schedule tribes. It has healthy sex ratio of 1058 females per 1000 male in the village. The population of this village increased by 2.6% between 2001-11.

== Government and politics ==
Nadimpalle gram panchayat is the local self-government of the village. It is divided into wards and each ward is represented by a ward member.

== Education ==
As per the school information report for the academic year 2018–19, the village has a total of 3 Mandal Parishad schools.
