= Rambhotlapalem =

- Village
- Interactive map of Rambhotlapalem
- Location in Andhra Pradesh, India
- Coordinates: 16.0239944°N 80.6349545°E
- Country: India
- State: Andhra Pradesh
- District: Bapatla
- Mandal: Cherukupalle

Government
  - Type: Panchayati raj
  - Body: Rambhotlapalem gram panchayat

Area
  - Total: 1,472 ha (3,640 acres)

Population (2011)
  - Total: 6,015
  - Density: 408.6/km^{2} (1,058/sq mi)

Languages
  - Official: Telugu
- Time zone: UTC+5:30 (IST)
- PIN: 522309
- Area code: +91–8644
- Vehicle registration: AP

Rambhotlapalem is a village in Bapatla district of the Indian state of Andhra Pradesh. It is the located in Cherukupalle mandal of Tenali revenue division. Piped Water Supply scheme, under ARWSP, provides water to the residents.

== Geography ==
Rambhotlapalem is situated to the southwest of the mandal headquarters, Arumbaka, at 16.0239944°N 80.6349545°E. It is spread over an area of 1,472 ha (3,640 acres).

== Demographics ==
The village is home to 6,015 people with 1,628 households. The population consists of 2% schedule castes, and 3% schedule tribes. It has an unhealthy sex ratio of 898 females per 1000 male in the village. The sex ratio of this village decreased drastically by 190 points between 2001-11, particularly alarmingly among SC households.

== Government and politics ==
Rambhotlapalem gram panchayat is the local self-government of the village. It is divided into wards and each ward is represented by a ward member.

== Education ==
As per the school information report for the academic year 2018–19, the village has a total of 6 Zilla/Mandal Parishad schools.
