= Adigoppula =

- Village
- Interactive map of Adigoppula
- Location in Andhra Pradesh, India
- Coordinates: 16.4401661°N 79.6235407°E
- Country: India
- State: Andhra Pradesh
- District: Palnadu
- Mandal: Durgi

Government
  - Type: Panchayati raj
  - Body: Adigoppula gram panchayat

Area
  - Total: 3,349 ha (8,280 acres)

Population (2011)
  - Total: 10,579
  - Density: 315.9/km^{2} (818.1/sq mi)

Languages
  - Official: Telugu
- Time zone: UTC+5:30 (IST)
- PIN: 522612
- Area code: +91–863
- Vehicle registration: AP

Adigoppula is a village in Palnadu district of the Indian state of Andhra Pradesh. It is located in Durgi mandal of Gurazala revenue division, and the distance from Adigoppila to Gurazala is 23 kilometers. The Gram Panchayat is Adigoppula. The mandal headquarters is Durgi, and the distance from Adigoppula to Durgi is 9 kilometers. The district headquarters is Guntur, and the distance from Adigoppula to Guntur is 99 kilometers. The nearest towns are Macherla and Karempudi, and the distance from Adigoppula to Macherla is 22 kilometers. Adigoppula's pincode is 522612.

== Geography ==
Adigoppula is situated to the northwest of the mandal headquarters, Durgi, at 16.4401661°N 79.6235407°E. It is spread over an area of 3,349 ha (8,280 acres).

== History ==
This site is significant for the worship of Goddess Neelampati Sri Lakshmi Ammavaru, who was born in the 15th century in the village of Nidanampadu. A notable aspect of the area is the veneration of a Sila (rock) and a Neem tree in an open park, which are considered sacred. According to local legend, around 1500 AD, Yaganti Sri Lakshmi was born to Yaganti Ramayya and Sugunamma. At the age of 12, she began to worship Gowmatha (the cow) and, through divine grace, conceived a baby cow. However, her brothers, angered by this event, tragically burned Sri Lakshmi alive. Miraculously, the baby cow emerged from the flames, revealing the divine power of the cow and establishing its sanctity. Following this incident, villagers began to worship Sri Lakshmi as Neelampati Sri Lakshmi Ammavaru. In keeping with the goddess's divine message, no statue or formal temple has been constructed for her, and only minimal facilities are provided at the site.

== Governance ==
Adigoppula gram panchayat is the local self-government of the village. It is divided into wards and each ward is represented by a ward member.

== Education ==
As per the school information report for the academic year 2018–19, the village has one private and three MPP schools.
