= Kothalur =

Kothaluru
- Village
- Interactive map of Kothaluru
- Location in Andhra Pradesh, India
- Coordinates: 16.1318°N 79.8058°E
- Country: India
- State: Andhra Pradesh
- District: Palnadu
- Mandal: Savalyapuram

Government
  - Type: Panchayati raj
  - Body: Kothaluru gram panchayat

Area
  - Total: 1,789 ha (4,420 acres)

Population (2011)
  - Total: 1,824
  - Density: 102.0/km^{2} (264.1/sq mi)

Languages
  - Official: Telugu
- Time zone: UTC+5:30 (IST)
- PIN: 522xxx
- Area code: +91–
- Vehicle registration: AP

Kothaluru is a village in Palnadu district of the Indian state of Andhra Pradesh. It is located in Savalyapuram mandal.

== Government and politics ==
Kothalur gram panchayat is the local self-government of the village. It is divided into wards and each ward is represented by a ward member. The ward members are headed by a Sarpanch.
