= Pudiwada =

- Village
- Interactive map of Pudiwada
- Location in Andhra Pradesh, India
- Coordinates: 16°0′16″N 80°43′28″E
- Country: India
- State: Andhra Pradesh
- District: Bapatla
- Mandal: Nagaram

Government
  - Type: Panchayati raj
  - Body: Pudiwada gram panchayat

Area
  - Total: 827 ha (2,040 acres)

Population (2011)
  - Total: 3,484
  - Density: 421/km^{2} (1,090/sq mi)

Languages
  - Official: Telugu
- Time zone: UTC+5:30 (IST)
- PIN: 522xxx
- Area code: +91–
- Vehicle registration: AP

Pudiwada is a village in Bapatla district of the Indian state of Andhra Pradesh. It is located in Nagaram mandal of Tenali revenue division.

== Governance ==
Pudiwada gram panchayat is the local self-government of the village. It is divided into wards and each ward is represented by a ward member.

== Education ==
As per the school information report for the academic year 2018–19, the village has a total of 5 schools. These include 2 private and 3 MPP schools.
