= Narasingapadu =

- Village
- Interactive map of Narasingapadu
- Location in Andhra Pradesh, India
- Coordinates: 16.3946°N 79.9125°E
- Country: India
- State: Andhra Pradesh
- District: Palnadu
- Mandal: Nakarikallu

Government
  - Type: Panchayati raj
  - Body: Narasingapadu gram panchayat

Area
  - Total: 512 ha (1,270 acres)

Population (2011)
  - Total: 2,054
  - Density: 401/km^{2} (1,040/sq mi)

Languages
  - Official: Telugu
- Time zone: UTC+5:30 (IST)
- PIN: 522615
- Area code: +91–
- Vehicle registration: AP-07

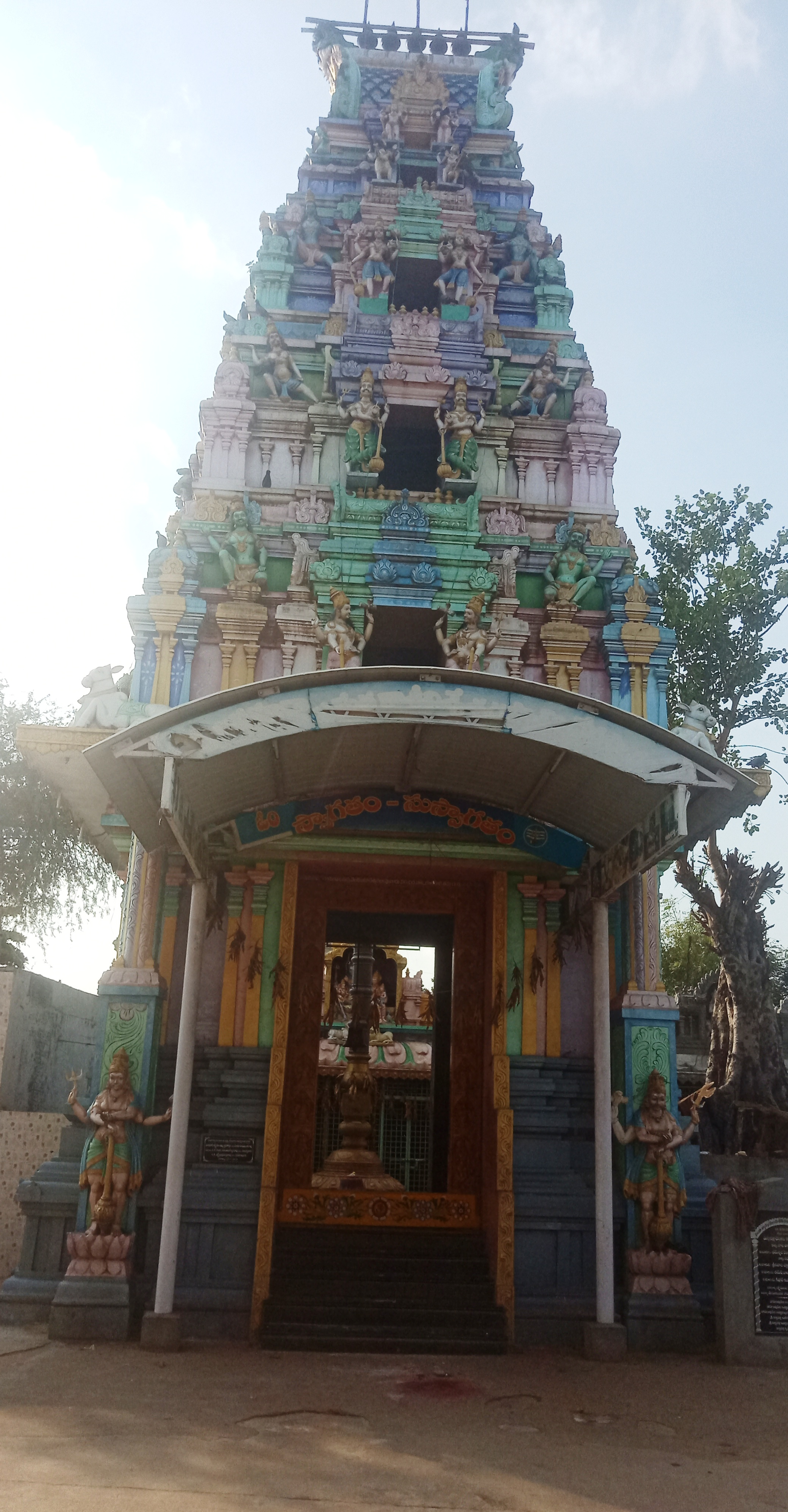
Galigopuram of a temple in Narisingapadu village

Narasingapadu is a village in Palnadu district, (earlier Palnadu district) of the Indian state of Andhra Pradesh. It is located in Nekarikallu mandal of Sattenapalli revenue division.

== Governance ==
Narasingapadu gram panchayat is the local self-government of the village. It is divided into wards and each ward is represented by a ward member.

== Education ==
As per the school information report for the academic year 2018–19, the village has only one MPP school.

== Education ==
The primary and secondary school education is imparted by government, aided and private schools, under the School Education Department of the state. The total number of students enrolled in primary, upper primary and high schools in the village are 41.

Zilla Parishad High School is a Zilla Parishad funded school, which provides secondary education in the village.
