= Nalluru =

- Village
- Interactive map of Nalluru
- Location in Andhra Pradesh, India
- Coordinates: 16.314853°N 80.177044°E
- Country: India
- State: Andhra Pradesh
- District: Bapatla
- Mandal: Repalle

Government
  - Type: Panchayati raj
  - Body: Nalluru gram panchayat

Area
  - Total: 780 ha (1,900 acres)

Population (2011)
  - Total: 1,862
  - Density: 240/km^{2} (620/sq mi)

Languages
  - Official: Telugu
- Time zone: UTC+5:30 (IST)
- PIN: 522xxx
- Area code: +91–
- Vehicle registration: AP

Nalluru is a village in Bapatla district of the Indian state of Andhra Pradesh. It is located in Repalle mandal of Tenali revenue division.

== Governance ==
Nalluru gram panchayat is the local self-government of the village. It is divided into wards and each ward is represented by a ward member. The elected members of the gram panchayat is headed by a sarpanch.
