= Pedanandipadu =

- Village
- Interactive map of Pedanandipadu
- Location in Andhra Pradesh, India
- Coordinates: 16°04′22″N 80°19′46″E
- Country: India
- State: Andhra Pradesh
- District: Guntur
- Mandal: Pedanandipadu

Government
  - Type: Panchayati raj
  - Body: Pedanandipadu gram panchayat

Area
  - Total: 1,390 ha (3,400 acres)

Population (2011)
  - Total: 6,090
  - Density: 438/km^{2} (1,130/sq mi)

Languages
  - Official: Telugu
- Time zone: UTC+5:30 (IST)
- PIN: 522235
- Area code: +91–
- Vehicle registration: AP

Pedanandipadu is a village in the Guntur district of the Indian state of Andhra Pradesh. It is located in Pedanandipadu mandal of Guntur revenue division.

== Demographics ==
As of 2011 census, the village has population of 6090 of which 3044 are males and 3046 are females. Average Sex Ratio of the village is 1001 which is higher than Andhra Pradesh state average of 993. Population of children with age 0-6 is 485 which makes up 7.96% of total population of village. Child Sex Ratio for the Pedanandipadu as per census is 1091, higher than Andhra Pradesh average of 939. In 2011, literacy rate of Pedanandipadu village was 75.18% compared to 67.02% of Andhra Pradesh.

== Government and politics ==
Pedanandipadu gram panchayat is the local self-government of the village. It is divided into wards and each ward is represented by a ward member. The ward members are headed by a Sarpanch.

== Education ==
As per the school information report for the academic year 2018–19, the village has a total of 10 schools. These include one government school, 3 Zilla Parishad/Mandal Parishad and 6 private schools. The Pedanandipadu College Of Arts And Science is a big college in Pedanandipadu

== Transport ==
Guntur-Parchur Road connects the village with the district headquarters, Guntur. Bapatla Road and Road to Chilakaluripet Extended to Double Way, And Have a single road to Ponnur.

== See also ==
- List of villages in Guntur district
