= Nadendla =

- Village
- Interactive map of Nadendla
- Location in Andhra Pradesh, India
- Coordinates: 16°10′30″N 80°11′10″E
- Country: India
- State: Andhra Pradesh
- District: Palnadu
- Mandal: Nadendla

Government
  - Type: Panchayati raj
  - Body: Nadendla gram panchayat

Area
  - Total: 4,020 ha (9,900 acres)

Population (2011)
  - Total: 10,935
  - Density: 272/km^{2} (705/sq mi)

Languages
  - Official: Telugu
- Time zone: UTC+5:30 (IST)
- PIN: 522234
- Area code: +91–8647
- Vehicle registration: AP

Nadendla is a village in Palnadu district of the Indian state of Andhra Pradesh. It is the headquarters of Nadendla mandal in Narasaraopet revenue division.

== Demographics ==
As of 2011 Census of India, the town had a population of 10,935. The total population constitute, 5,623 males, 5,312 females and 1,028 children, in the age group of 0–6 years. The average literacy rate stands at 58.00% with 5,746 literates, significantly lower than the national average of 73.00%.

== Governance ==
Nadendla gram panchayat is the local self-government of the village. It is divided into wards and each ward is represented by a ward member.

== Education ==
As per the school information report for the academic year 2018–19, the village has a total of 15 schools. These include one KGBV, 2 private and 12 Zilla Parishad/MPP schools.
