= Muppalla =

- Village
- Interactive map of Muppalla
- Location in Andhra Pradesh, India
- Coordinates: 16.3207°N 80.09194°E
- Country: India
- State: Andhra Pradesh
- District: Palnadu
- Mandal: Muppalla

Government
  - Type: Panchayati raj
  - Body: Muppalla gram panchayat
  - Sarpanch: Vinukonda Praveen Kumar

Area
  - Total: 1,741 ha (4,300 acres)

Languages
  - Official: Telugu
- Time zone: UTC+5:30 (IST)
- Postal code: 522408
- Area code: +91
- Vehicle registration: AP

Muppalla is a village and headquarters of Muppalla mandal in Palnadu district of the Indian state of Andhra Pradesh.

== Governance ==
Muppalla gram panchayat is the local self-government of the village. It is divided into wards and each ward is represented by a ward member.

== Education ==
As per the school information report for the academic year 2018–19, the village has 9 schools. These are 4 Zilla Parishad/MPP, one KGBV, one other type and 3 private schools.
