= Pedakurapadu mandal =

- Mandal
- Interactive map outlining mandal
- Location in Andhra Pradesh, India
- Country: India
- State: Andhra Pradesh
- District: Palnadu
- Headquarters: Pedakurapadu

Government
  - Body: Mandal Parishad
  - MPP: Bellamkonda Meraiah
  - MPDO: Narasimha Rao
  - Tehsildar: Kshama Rani

Population (2011)
  - Total: 50,030

Languages
  - Official: Telugu
- Time zone: UTC+5:30 (IST)
- Vehicle registration: AP39

Pedakurapadu Mandal, is a mandal in Palnadu district of Andhra Pradesh.It is under the administration of Sattenapalli revenue division and the headquarters are located at Pedakurapadu. The mandal is bounded by Krosuru Mandal, Sattenapalli Mandal, Amaravathi Mandal, Medikonduru Mandal, and Achampeta Mandal. It is a part of Palnadu Urban Development Authority (PAUDA)

== Demographics ==
As of 2011 census, the mandal had a population of 50,030. The total population constitute, 25,031 males and 24,999 females —a sex ratio of 999 females per 1000 males. 5,004 children are in the age group of 0–6 years, of which 2,595 are boys and 2,409 are girls —a ratio of 935 girls per 1000 boys. The average literacy rate stands at 56.53% with 28,285 literates.

== Administration ==
The mandal is a part of the Palnadu Urban Development Authority (PAUDA). It is under the control of a tahsildar and the present tahsildar is Kshama Rani. Pedakurapdu mandal is one of the 5 mandals under Pedakurapadu (Assembly constituency), which in turn represents Narasaraopet (Lok Sabha constituency) of Andhra Pradesh.

== Settlements ==
As of 2011 census, the mandal has 20 settlements, which includes 14 Revenue villages and 6 Non Revenue Villages.

The settlements in the mandal are listed below:

1. 75 Tyallur
2. Balusupadu
3. Chinamakkena
4. Garapadu
5. Hussainnagaram
6. Jalalpuram
7. Khambampadu
8. Kasipadu
9. Lagadapadu
10. Lingamguntla
11. Mussapuram
12. Patibandla
13. Pedakurapadu
14. Ramapuram
15. Kannegandla
16. Abbaraju Palem
17. Buchaiahpalem
18. Parasa
19. Podapadu
20. Thammavaram

== Transport ==
Pedakurapdu railway station is in Pedakurapadu mandal.

== See also ==
- List of mandals in Andhra Pradesh
