= Tadikonda mandal =

- Mandal
- Tadikonda
- Interactive Map Outlining mandal
- Location in Andhra Pradesh, India
- Country: India
- State: Andhra Pradesh
- District: Guntur
- Established: 1985
- Headquarters: Tadikonda

Government
  - Body: Mandal Parishad
  - Tehsildar: G. Anil Kumar

Area
  - Total: 194.23 km^{2} (74.99 sq mi)
- Elevation: 35 m (115 ft)

Population (2011)
  - Total: 67,962
  - Density: 349.90/km^{2} (906.25/sq mi)

Languages
  - Official: Telugu
- Time zone: UTC+5:30 (IST)
- PIN: 522236
- Vehicle registration: AP 39
- Website: guntur.ap.gov.in

Tadikonda mandal is one of the 18 mandals in Guntur district of the Indian state of Andhra Pradesh. The mandal is under the administration of Guntur revenue division and the headquarters are located at Tadikonda.

== Demographics ==
As of 2011 census, the mandal had a population of 67,962. The total population constitute, 33,655 males and 34,305 females —a sex ratio of 1019 females per 1000 males. 6,683 children are in the age group of 0–6 years.

== Towns and villages ==
As of 2011 census, the mandal has 12 villages. The settlements in the mandal are listed below:

1. Pamulapadu
2. Bejatpuram
3. Lachannagudipudi
4. Mothadaka
5. Nidumukkala
6. Tadikonda
7. Ponnekallu
8. Ravela
9. Bandarupalle
10. Damarapalle
11. Lam
12. Kantheru

== Administration ==
The mandal forms a part of the Andhra Pradesh Capital Region under the jurisdiction of APCRDA. It is under the control of a tahsildar and the present tahsildar is G. Anil Kumar

== Politics ==
Tadikonda mandal is one of the mandals under Tadikonda Assembly constituency of Guntur Lok Sabha constituency in the state of Andhra Pradesh.

== Education ==
The mandal plays a major role in education for the rural students of the nearby villages. The primary and secondary school education is imparted by government, aided and private schools, under the School Education Department of the state. As per the school information report for the academic year 2015–16, the mandal has more than 7,592 students enrolled in over 63 schools.

== Transport ==
Buses are available at regular timings between Guntur and Tadikonda. Guntur is 18 kilometres (11 miles) from Tadikonda. Nearest Railway Station is Guntur Junction Railway Station located at 20 km.

== See also ==
- List of mandals in Andhra Pradesh
- Villages in Tadikonda mandal
