= Pedanandipadu mandal =

- Mandal
- Interactive Map Outlining mandal
- Location within Andhra Pradesh
- Country: India
- State: Andhra Pradesh
- District: Guntur
- Headquarters: Pedanandipadu

Government
  - Body: Mandal Parishad

Area
  - Total: 154.22 km^{2} (59.54 sq mi)

Population (2011)
  - Total: 41,980
  - Density: 272.2/km^{2} (705.0/sq mi)

Languages
  - Official: Telugu
- Time zone: UTC+5:30 (IST)

Pedanandipadu mandal is one of the 18 mandals in Guntur district of the Indian state of Andhra Pradesh. It is under the administration of Guntur revenue division and the headquarters are located at Pedanandipadu.

== Government ==
=== Administration ===
The mandal is under the control of a tahsildar and the present tahsildar is G.V.Subba Reddy.

As of 2011 census, the mandal has thirteen villages with one town.

The settlements in the mandal are listed below:

1. Annaparru
2. Kopparru
3. Rajupalem
4. Annavaram
5. Uppalapadu
6. Palaparru
7. Pedanandipadu †
8. Varagani
9. Gorijavoluguntapalem
10. Ravipadu
11. Pusuluru
12. Katrapadu

Note: †-Headquarters

== See also ==
- List of mandals in Andhra Pradesh
- Villages in Pedanandipadu mandal
