= Kakumanu =

- Village
- Interactive map of Kakumanu
- Location in Andhra Pradesh, India
- Coordinates: 16°3′16″N 80°23′56″E
- Country: India
- State: Andhra Pradesh
- District: Guntur
- Mandal: Kakumanu

Government
  - Type: Panchayati raj
  - Body: Kakumanu gram panchayat

Area
  - Total: 1,476 ha (3,650 acres)

Population (2011)
  - Total: 5,777
  - Density: 391.4/km^{2} (1,014/sq mi)

Languages
  - Official: Telugu
- Time zone: UTC+5:30 (IST)
- PIN: 522112
- Area code: +91–8643
- Vehicle registration: AP

Kakumanu is a village in Guntur district of the Indian state of Andhra Pradesh. It is the headquarters of Kakumanu mandal in Tenali revenue division.

== Geography ==
Kakumanu is situated at 16°3′16″N 80°23′56″E. It is spread over an area of 1,476 ha (3,650 acres).

== Governance ==
Kakumanu gram panchayat is the local self-government of the village. It is divided into wards and each ward is represented by a ward member.

== Education ==
As per the school information report for the academic year 2018–19, the village has 5 schools. These include one private and 4 Zilla/Mandal Parishad schools.

== Demographics ==
As per the 2011 Indian census, the population of the village is 5,777 of which 2860 are males and 2917 females. In 2011, the literacy rate of Kakumanu village was 68.83 % compared to 67.02 % of Andhra Pradesh. In Kakumanu male literacy stood at 76.85 % and female literacy at 60.88 %.

== See also ==
- List of villages in Guntur district
