= Ipur, Palnadu district =

Ipur
- Village
- Interactive map of Ipur
- Location in Andhra Pradesh, India
- Coordinates: 16.229429°N 79.775488°E
- Country: India
- State: Andhra Pradesh
- District: Palnadu
- Mandal: Ipur

Government
  - Type: Panchayati raj
  - Body: Ipur gram panchayat

Area
  - Total: 2,471 ha (6,110 acres)

Population (2011)
  - Total: 5,935
  - Density: 240.2/km^{2} (622.1/sq mi)

Languages
  - Official: Telugu
- Time zone: UTC+5:30 (IST)
- PIN: 522647
- Area code: +91–8646
- Vehicle registration: AP

Ipur is a village in Palnadu district of the Indian state of Andhra Pradesh. It is the headquarters of Ipur mandal in Narasaraopet revenue division.

== Geography ==
Ipur is situated at 16.2333°N 79.8°E. It is spread over an area of 2,471 ha (6,110 acres).

== Governance ==
Ipur gram panchayat is the local self-government of the village. It is divided into wards and each ward is represented by a ward member.

== Education ==
As per the school information report for the academic year 2018–19, the village has 10 schools. These include one KGBV, one model, 2 private and 6 Zilla/Mandal Parishad schools.
