= Edlapadu =

- Village
- Interactive map of Edlapadu
- Location in Andhra Pradesh, India
- Coordinates: 16°12′N 80°12′E
- Country: India
- State: Andhra Pradesh
- District: Palnadu
- Mandal: Edlapadu

Government
  - Type: Panchayati raj
  - Body: Edlapadu gram panchayat

Area
  - Total: 1,013 ha (2,500 acres)

Population (2011)
  - Total: 10,996
  - Density: 1,085/km^{2} (2,811/sq mi)

Languages
  - Official: Telugu
- Time zone: UTC+5:30 (IST)
- PIN: 522259
- Area code: +91–8644
- Vehicle registration: AP

Edlapadu is a village in Palnadu district of the Indian state of Andhra Pradesh. It is the headquarters of Edlapadu mandal in Narasaraopet revenue division.

== Geography ==
Edlapadu is situated at 16.1007°N 80.1339°E. It is spread over an area of 1,013 ha (2,500 acres).

== Governance ==
Edlapadu gram panchayat is the local self-government of the village. It is divided into wards and each ward is represented by a ward member. The village forms a part of Andhra Pradesh Capital Region and is under the jurisdiction of APCRDA.

== Education ==
As per the school information report for the academic year 2018–19, the village has a total of 12 schools. These schools include 5 private and 7 Zilla Parishad/Mandal Parishad schools.
