= Narasaraopet revenue division =

Narasaraopeta revenue division
- revenue division in Palnadu district
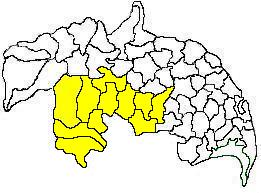
- Mandals in Narasaraopeta revenue division (in yellow) of Guntur district
- Country: India
- State: Andhra Pradesh
- District: Palnadu

Narasaraopeta revenue division is an administrative division in the Palnadu district of the Indian state of Andhra Pradesh. It comprises 9 mandals and is one of the three revenue divisions in the district, along with Gurajala and Sattenapalli. Narasaraopet serves as the headquarters of the division.

== Administration ==
The mandals in the revenue division are:

No.	Mandals
1	Chilakaluripet mandal
2	Nadendla mandal
3	Edlapadu mandal
4	Narasaraopet mandal
5	Rompicharla mandal
6	Vinukonda mandal
7	Nuzendla mandal
8	Savalyapuram mandal
9	Ipuru mandal

== See also ==
- List of revenue divisions in Andhra Pradesh
