= Guntur revenue division =

- Revenue division in Guntur district
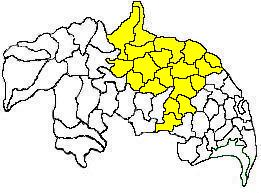
- Mandals in Guntur revenue division (in yellow) of Guntur district
- Country: India
- State: Andhra Pradesh
- District: Guntur

Guntur revenue division is an administrative division in the Guntur district of the Indian state of Andhra Pradesh. It comprises 10 mandals and is one of the two revenue divisions in the district, along with Tenali. Guntur serves as the headquarters of the division.

== Administration ==
The mandals in the revenue division are:

No.	Mandals
1	Tadikonda mandal
2	Thullur mandal
3	Phirangipuram mandal
4	Medikonduru mandal
5	Guntur East mandal
6	Guntur West mandal
7	Prathipadu mandal
8	Vatticherukuru mandal
9	Pedanandipadu mandal
10	Pedakakani mandal

== See also ==
- List of revenue divisions in Andhra Pradesh
