= Andhradesa =

Andhradesha
- Region
- Country: India
- State: Andhra Pradesh; Telangana
- Capitals: Andhapura; Dhanyakataka

Āndhradeśa (Telugu: ఆంధ్రదేశ; transl. Country of Andhras) is a historical region in the Deccan Plateau of the Indian subcontinent, deriving its name from the ancient Andhras tribe, who inhabited and ruled the region since the Iron Age. The core territory of Andhradesha encompassed Andhra Pradesh and Telangana. At its zenith, the Andhradesha extended its influence over parts of present-day Maharashtra, Odisha, Karnataka, Madhya Pradesh and Gujarat.

The Andhras were an ancient non-Aryan tribe who lived around the deltas of the Godavari and Krishna rivers. Andhras were mentioned in the ancient Hindu scriptures such as the Aitareya Brahmana (c. 500 BCE), Ramayana, Mahabharata and Puranas. Greek historian Megasthenes reported in his Indica (c. 310 BCE) that Andhras were living in the Godavari and Krishna river deltas, and were famous for their military strength which was second only to Mauryans in all of India. They had 30 fortified towns along the Godavari River and an army of 100,000 infantry, 2,000 cavalry and 1,000 elephants. They were also mentioned at the time of the death of the Mauryan Emperor Ashoka in 232 BCE.

== Etymology ==
Andhradesha, an ancient region, derived its name from the Andhra tribe that flourished along the Godavari and Krishna river deltas. The term Andhradesha is a compound word, derived from the words "Andhra" and "desha". "Andhra" refers to the ancient Andhras tribe, while "desha" denotes country or territory.

Other names are Andhra, Andhrapatha, Andhramandala and Andhrabhumi.

== Extent ==
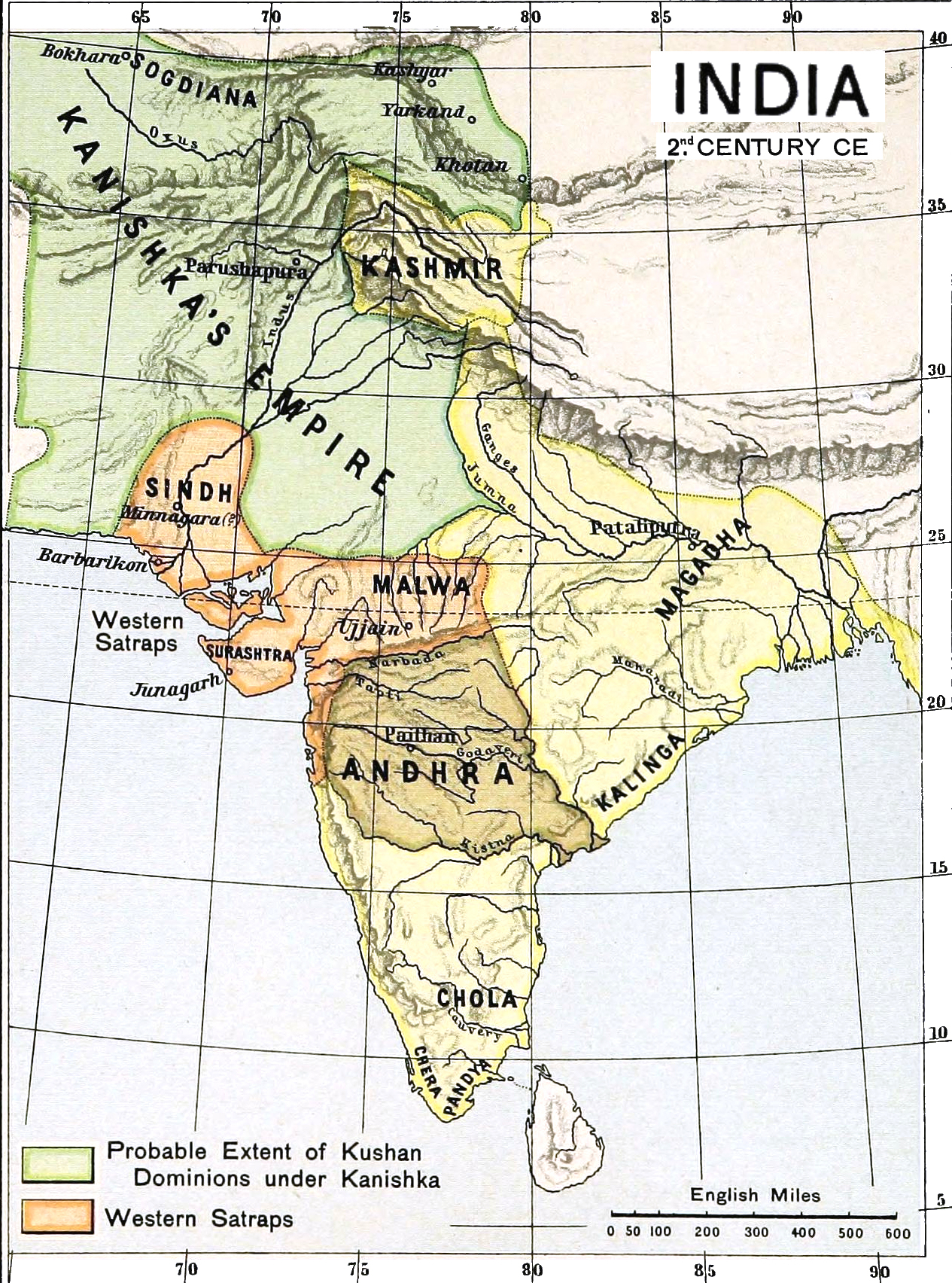
Andhradesa in 2nd CE

The heartland of Andhradesha lay in the fertile deltaic regions of the Godavari and Krishna rivers. These mighty rivers, carrying vast quantities of silt from the Western Ghats, formed expansive deltas that enriched the surrounding lands. The Kolanu lake (Kolleru Lake), situated between these deltas, played a significant role in the region's ecology and history. The deltaic region, with its rich alluvial soil and abundant water resources, supported a thriving agricultural economy, fostering the growth of prosperous cities and towns.

Historically, Andhapura serving as its earliest capital. Later, Dhanakataka gained prominence which was visited by the Chinese Buddhist pilgrim Xuanzang. Its core territory encompassed modern-day Andhra Pradesh and Telangana. The Periplus of the Erythraean Sea, as well as Ptolemy's writings, mention about Andhradesha.

At its zenith, the region extended its influence over parts of present-day Maharashtra, Odisha, Karnataka, Madhya Pradesh, and Gujarat. Geographically, Andhradesha encompassed the eastern Deccan Plateau, bounded by the Balaghat Range to the west and the Eastern Ghats to the east. This region's diverse landscape, including fertile coastal plains and rugged plateaus, significantly influenced its historical trajectory and cultural development.

== Religion ==
Buddhism spread rapidly among the non-Aryan tribes of the Andhra region, gaining wider acceptance there than in Aryan society. The number of Buddhist sites in the northern districts of the former Madras State, particularly within the Andhra region, greatly outnumbers those found in the southern districts. From Sālihunde in present-day Visakhapatnam district in the north to Chinna Ganjam in Guntur district in the south, and from Gooty in Anantapur district in the west to Bhattiprolu in the east, the Andhra region experienced remarkable growth in Buddhist culture and art during the three centuries before and after the birth of Christ. A study of various Buddhist sites across South India indicates the existence of five major ancient trade and pilgrimage routes, all converging at Vengi, located centrally in the Andhra region. Most Buddhist establishments were situated along these routes, which connected Vengi to Kalinga, Dravida, Karnata, Maharashtra, and Kosala.

=== Mahayana Legacy ===
Buddhist expansion in Asia

The Andhra region was not merely a centre for traditional Buddhism, it was the crucible where Mahayana Buddhism was forged. This school developed primarily under the influence of the Mahasanghika sects near the Amaravati and Nagarjunakonda regions. It was here that the legendary philosopher Acharya Nagarjuna (c. 150–250 CE) formulated the Madhyamaka (Middle Way) philosophy based on the concept of Sunyata (Emptiness).

Nagarjuna's intellectual work, conducted at the university near the Krishna River, transformed the faith from a monastic practice into a global movement. Today, Mahayana is the largest and most widespread branch of Buddhism in the world, dominating the religious landscapes of China, Japan, Korea, and Vietnam. The iconography found in the Amaravati School of Art, the first to depict the Buddha in human form, set the aesthetic standard for Mahayana art that traveled along the Silk Road, linking Andhra to the spiritual life of East Asia.

== Currency ==
The coinage of the period indicates that lead and potin were more commonly used than copper. The large and diverse range of coin issues suggests the existence of a vast empire extending from coast to coast. Additionally, the discovery of a significant number of Roman coins provides evidence of active maritime trade with the Romans.

== Economy ==
The Periplus of the Erythraean Sea mentions of export of onyx stones, porcelain, muslin, cotton, perfumes, gum, and silk. Ptolemy refers to the Andhra people, trade along the eastern coast of India, and the ports of Kontakossyla, Koddura, and Allosygne. He also notes the port of Apheterion in the Maisolia region, corresponding to the Krishna River delta.

Maritime trade played a crucial role in the prosperity of Buddhism in the Andhra region for nearly six centuries, from approximately 300 BCE to 300 CE. Many Buddhists were drawn from the mercantile classes, whose wealth contributed significantly to the construction of major Buddhist sites such as Amaravati, Nagarjunakonda, and other stupas. Ancient market towns in the Andhra region included Dhannakataka (circa 250 BCE), Kevurura, Vijayapura, and Narasala.

== Subdivisions ==
=== Kingdoms ===
Various dynasties have ruled the region, including the Andhras (or Satavahana), Andhra Ikshvakus, Salankayana dynasty, Vishnukundina dynasty, Eastern Chalukyas, the Kakatiyas,the Reddi Kingdom , Nayakas and Vijayanagara Empire.

== Language ==
The linguistic history of Andhradesa is characterised by the transition from Prakrit and Sanskrit to the indigenous Telugu language.

- Bhattiprolu Script: One of the earliest precursors to the Southern scripts, discovered in the Bhattiprolu Stupa (c. 3rd century BCE). It contains unique features not found in Ashokan Brahmi, suggesting a regional variation in literacy very early on.
- Telugu-Kannada Script: Between the 4th and 10th centuries CE, the Telugu-Kannada script evolved from the Brahmi used by the Satavahanas and Andhra Ikshvakus. This script eventually diverged into the modern distinct scripts of Telugu and Kannada.

== Art ==
=== Amaravati School of Art ===
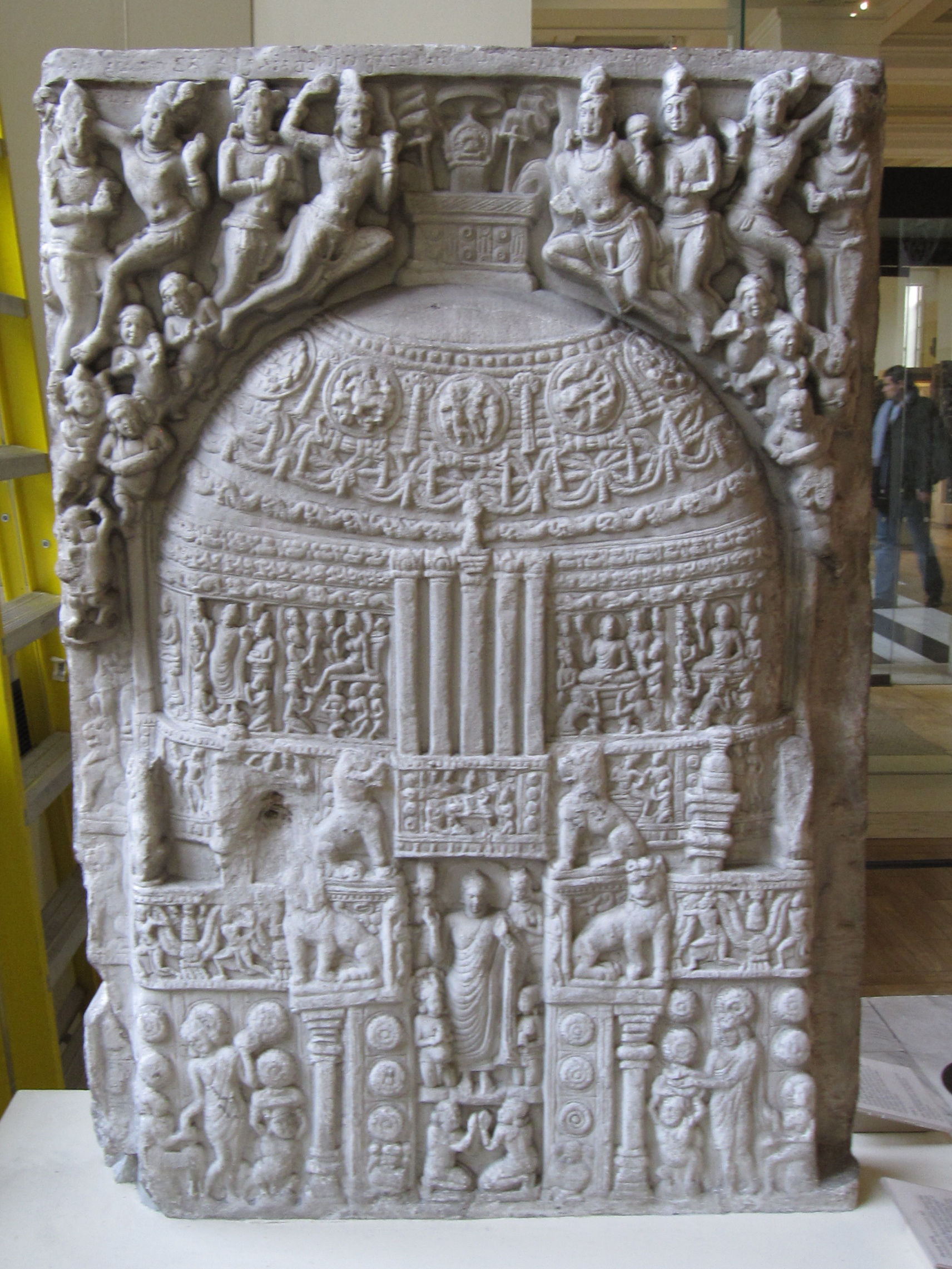
Amaravati Stupa

Andhradesa was home to the Amaravati School of Art, one of the three major styles of ancient Indian art alongside Mathura and Gandhara.

- The Amaravati Style: Known for its use of Palnad marble ( green-white limestone), the art of this region is famous for its narrative vivacity. Unlike the static figures of earlier styles, Amaravati sculptures depict crowded, energetic scenes with deep relief and fluid movement.
- Iconography: The Amaravati school was a pioneer in transitioning from aniconic symbols (representing Buddha with a throne or feet) to anthropomorphic forms (representing Buddha as a human). This style travelled via maritime trade routes to Southeast Asia, influencing the art of Sri Lanka, Thailand, and Indonesia.
- Stupa Architecture: The Maha Chaitya at Amaravati and the structures at Nagarjunakonda were grand architectural feats. These stupas were unique for their Ayaka platforms, projections at the four cardinal points topped with five pillars, representing the five major events in Buddha's life.

== See also ==
- History of Andhra Pradesh
- History of Telangana
- Amaravati art

== Sources ==
- Rao, Somasundara, ed. (2003). Comprehensive history and culture of Andhra Pradesh. Chennai: Orient Longman. ISBN 978-81-89487-81-2.
