= Jupudi =

- Village
- Interactive map of Jupudi
- Location in Andhra Pradesh, India
- Coordinates: 16.56033°N 80.25563°E
- Country: India
- State: Andhra Pradesh
- District: Palnadu
- Mandal: Amaravathi

Government
  - Type: Panchayati raj
  - Body: Jupudi Gram Panchayat

Area
  - Total: 463 km^{2} (179 sq mi)

Population (2011)
  - Total: 2,422
  - Density: 5.23/km^{2} (13.5/sq mi)

Languages
  - Official: Telugu
- Time zone: UTC+5:30 (IST)
- PIN: 522025
- Area code: +91–8640
- Vehicle registration: AP

Jupudi is a village in Palnadu district of the Indian state of Andhra Pradesh. It is located in Amaravathi mandal of Sattenapalli revenue division. The village forms a part of the Andhra Pradesh Capital Region, under the jurisdiction of APCRDA.

== Geography ==
Jupudi is situated to the west of the mandal headquarters, Amaravathi, at 16.56033°N 80.25563°E. It is spread over an area of 2,422 ha (5,980 acres).

== Demographics ==
As of 2011 Census of India, Jupudi had a population of 2,422, including 1,226 males and 1,196 females with a gender ratio of 976 females per 1000 males. 310 are in the age group of 0–6 years, with a child gender ratio of 902 girls per 1000 boys. The average literacy rate stands at 57.86%.

== Government and politics ==
Jupudi Gram Panchayat is the local self-government of the village. There are wards, each represented by an elected ward member. The ward members elect a sarpanch. The village is administered by the Amaravathi Mandal Parishad at the intermediate level of panchayat raj institutions.

== Education ==
As per the school information report for the academic year 2018–19, the village has only one Mandal Parishad Primary School.
