= Dhyana Buddha statue =

Buddha statue in Amaravathi, India

Dhyana Buddha
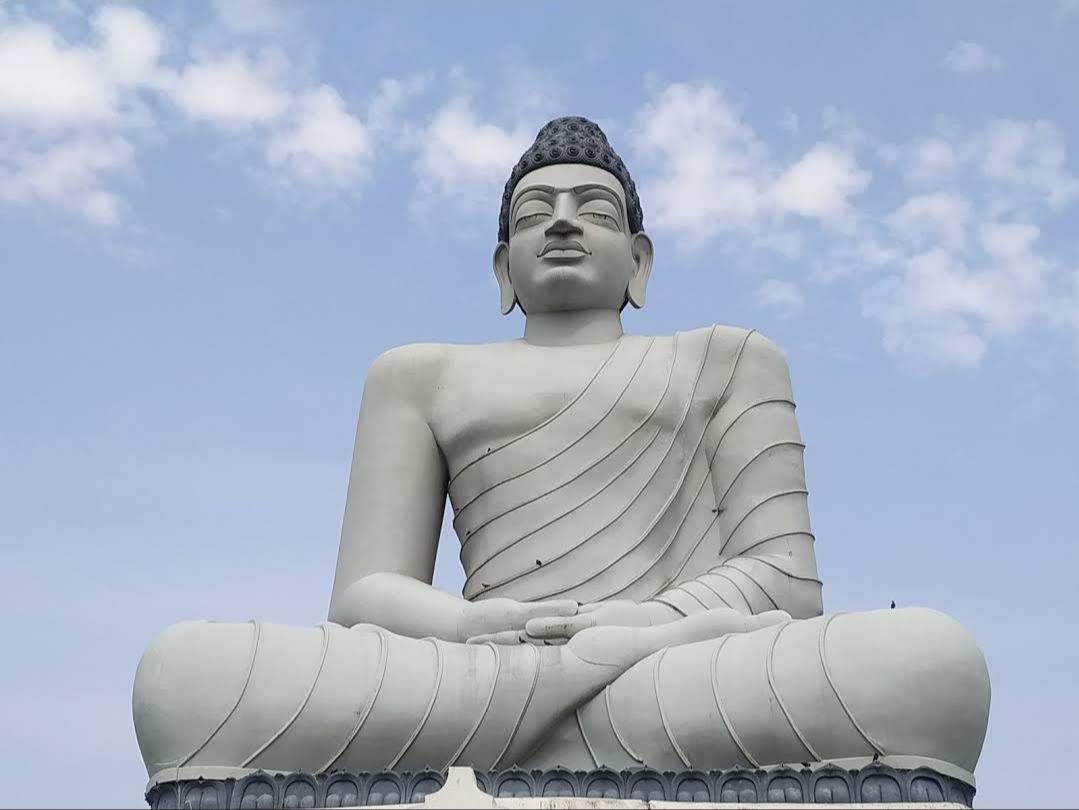

- Location in Andhra Pradesh, India
- 16.5789°N 80.3531°E
- Location: Amaravathi, India

History
- Dedicated: 2015

Site notes
- Height: 125 feet (38 m)
- Governing body: APTDC

The Dhyana Buddha is a statue of Gautama Buddha seated in a meditative posture located in Amaravathi, Andhra Pradesh, India. Completed in 2015, the statue is 125 ft (38 m) tall and is occupies a 4.5-acre site on the banks of the Krishna River. It is embellished with modern reproductions of sculptures from the Amaravati School of art which flourished in the region from 200 BC to 200 AD.

== History ==
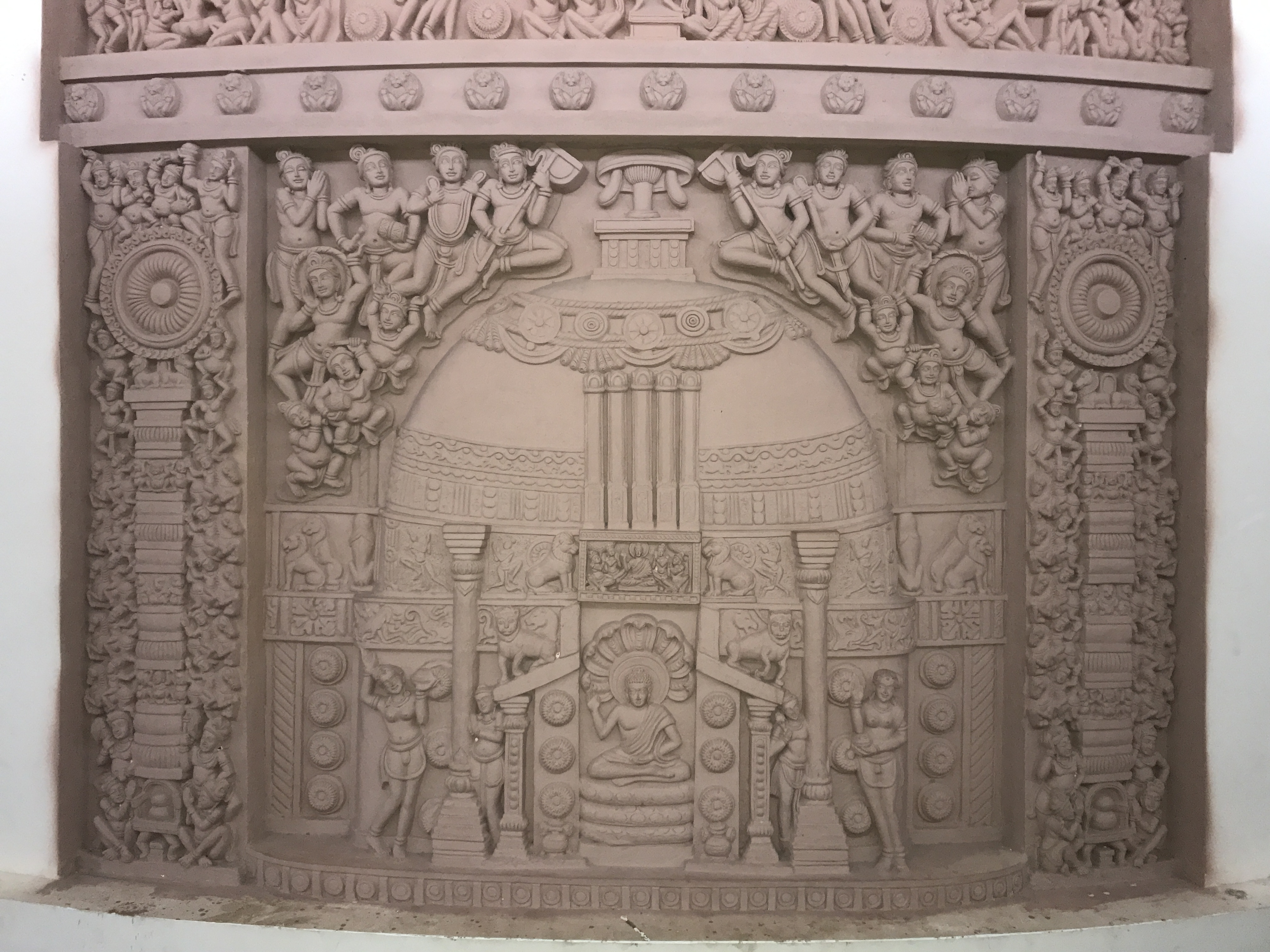
Mahachaitya Art in Dhyana Buddha Statue

The recorded history of Amaravati and nearby Dharanikota dates back to the 5th century BC. Amaravati was the capital of Satavahanas, who ruled from the 3rd century BC to the 3rd century AD. The Satavahanas were notable for their patronage of both Buddhism and Hinduism. The most important historic monument in Amaravathi is the Mahachaitya, which is protected by the Archaeological Survey of India and has a site museum known as the old museum.

The Dhyana Buddha project was conceived by R. Mallikarjuna Rao in 2002, who was then the Deputy Director of the Social Welfare Department in Guntur district, Andhra Pradesh. Inspired by the magnificence of the Amaravati School of Art, which flourished in the region circa 200 BC – 200 AD and wanted to recreate it. The Guntur district administration provided 4.5 acre of land for the project, and construction began in 2003–04. The funds for the project were provided by the Andhra Pradesh state government, Guntur district administration, Dalai Lama, Tourism Department, Kalachakra organisers Norbulingka, and also from the sale of greeting cards and paintings done by Mallikarjuna Rao. The Department of Tourism took over the project in 2007. The construction was completed in 2015.

== Location and structure ==
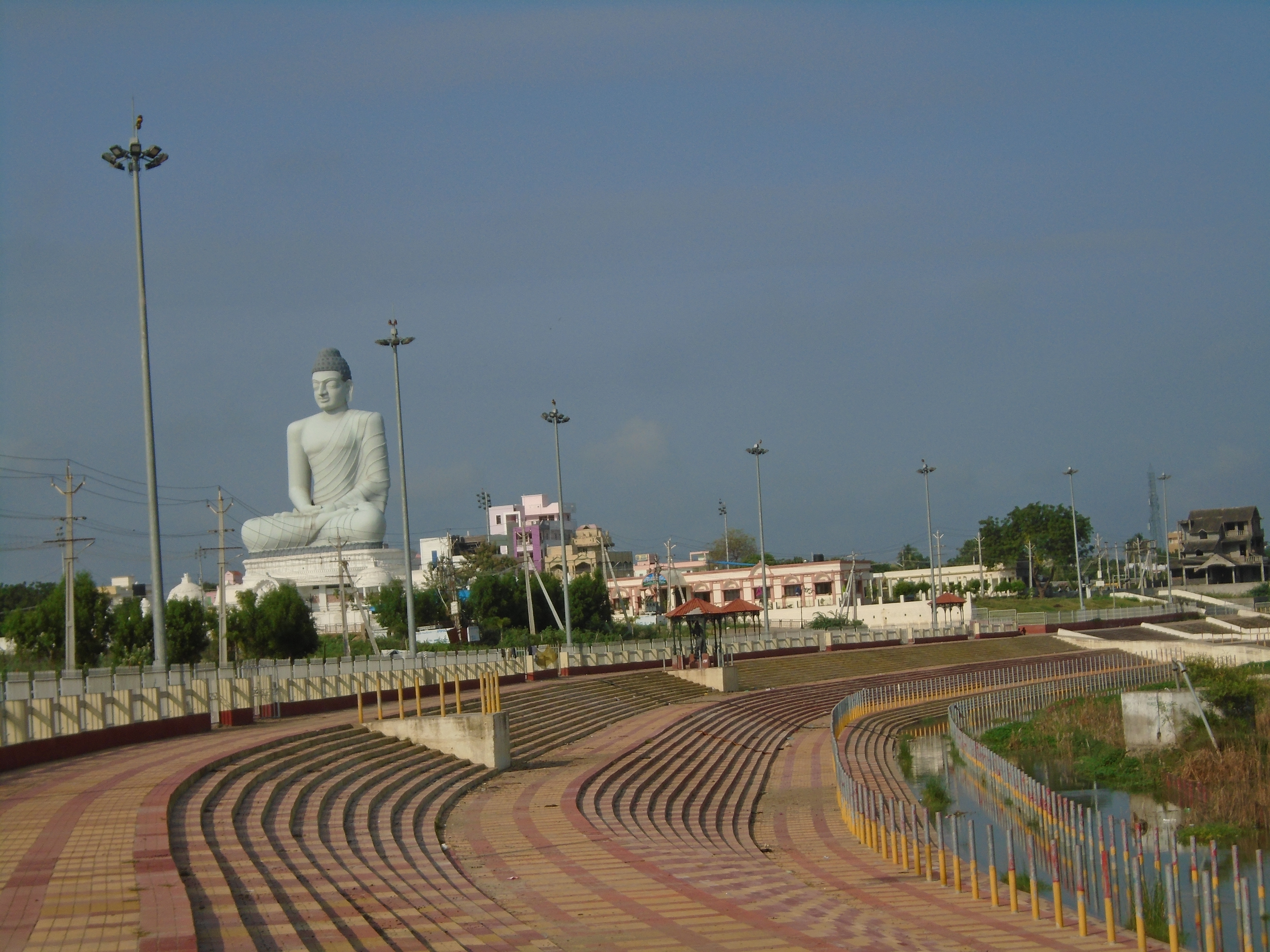
Amaravathi Andhrapradesh

The Dhyana Buddha statue of 125 ft (38 m) is located at Amaravati. It is situated on the banks of the Krishna River in 4.5 acres (1.8 ha) with eight pillars on a Lotus pandal.

== Structure and significance ==
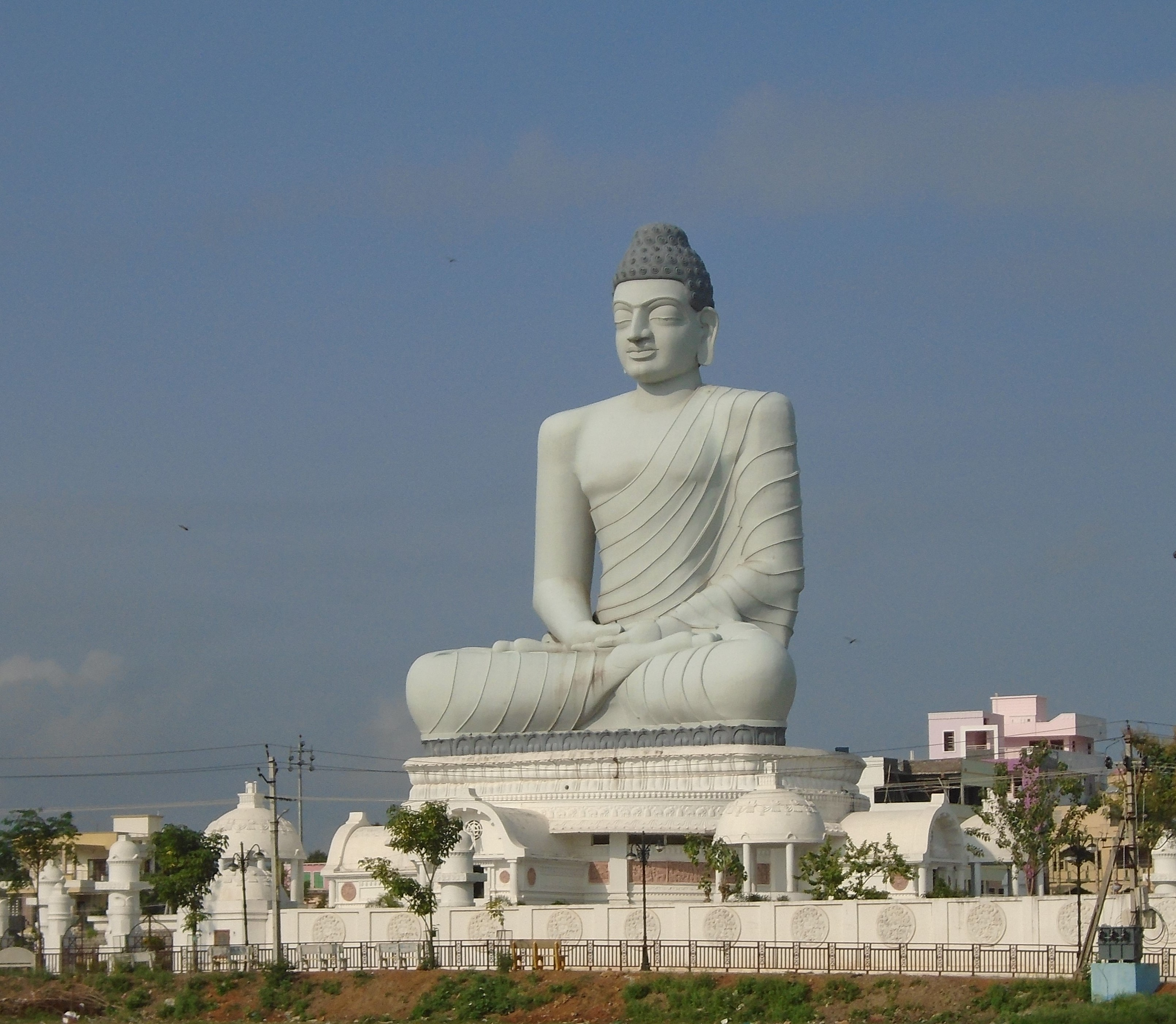
Amaravathi Andhrapradesh

The statue was commissioned in 2003 and completed in 2015. The statue stands on massive Lotus pandal supported by eight pillars symbolizing the Buddha's Noble Eightfold Path to attain salvation. The area is divided into four zones depicting the noble truths and five ayaka pillars for stages of life. APTDC is going to complete the Theme Park in front of the statue which is said to be opened for the public in 2018.

The statue has a three-layered museum in the base underneath it, which consists of sculptures of Amaravati art depicting scenes with Buddhist significance, most modern copies of the original reliefs from the Amaravati Mahachaitya stupa which are now in museums around India and the world.

== See also ==
- List of tallest statues
- List of statues
