= Attalur =

- Village
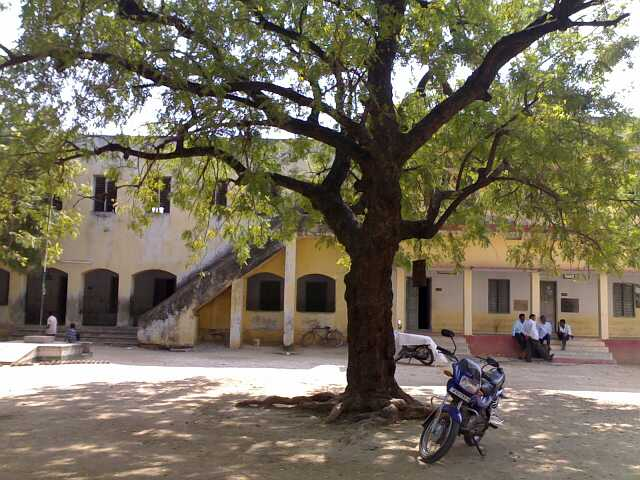
- R.C.M.High School in Attalur
- Interactive map of Attalur
- Location in Andhra Pradesh, India
- Coordinates: 16.535630°N 80.255274°E
- Country: India
- State: Andhra Pradesh
- District: Palnadu
- Mandal: Amaravathi mandal

Government
  - Type: Panchayati raj
  - Body: Attalur Gram Panchayat

Area
  - Total: 1,524 ha (3,770 acres)

Population (2011)
  - Total: 4,783
  - Density: 313.8/km^{2} (812.9/sq mi)

Languages
  - Official: Telugu
- Time zone: UTC+5:30 (IST)
- PIN: 522436
- Area code: +91–8640
- Vehicle registration: AP

Attalur is a village in Palnadu district of the Indian state of Andhra Pradesh. It is located in Amaravathi mandal of Sattenapalli revenue division. The village forms a part of Andhra Pradesh Capital Region, under the jurisdiction of APCRDA.

== Geography ==
Attalur is situated to the southwest of the mandal headquarters, Amaravathi, at 16.535630°N 80.255274°E. It is spread over an area of 1,524 ha (3,770 acres).

== Government and politics ==
Attalur Gram Panchayat is the local self-government of the village. The village is divided into wards, each being represented by an elected ward member. Ward members elected a sarpanch. The village is administered by the Amaravathi Mandal Parishad at the intermediate level of panchayat raj institutions.

== Education ==
As per the school information report for the academic year 2018–19, the village has a total of 7 schools. These schools include 5 MPP and 2 private schools.
