= Lingapuram =

- Village
- Interactive map of Lingapuram
- Location in Andhra Pradesh, India
- Coordinates: 16°32′01″N 80°19′42″E
- Country: India
- State: Andhra Pradesh
- District: Palnadu
- Mandal: Amaravathi

Government
  - Type: Panchayati raj

Area
  - Total: 582 km^{2} (225 sq mi)

Population (2011)
  - Total: 4,064
  - Density: 6.98/km^{2} (18.1/sq mi)

Languages
  - Official: Telugu
- Time zone: UTC+5:30 (IST)
- PIN: 522025
- Area code: +91–8640
- Vehicle registration: AP

Lingapuram is a village in Palnadu district of the Indian state of Andhra Pradesh. It is located in Amaravathi mandal of Guntur revenue division. The village forms a part of Andhra Pradesh Capital Region, under the jurisdiction of APCRDA.

== Geography ==
Lingapuram is situated to the southwest of the mandal headquarters, Amaravathi, at 16.45°N 80.37°E. It is spread over 582 ha (1,440 acres).

== Demographics ==
As of 2011 Census of India, Endroyi had a population of 4,068. The total population constituted 2,008 males and 2,058 females with a sex ratio of 1026 females per 1000 males. 480 children were in the age group of 0–6 years, with child sex ratio of 959 girls per 1000 boys. The average literacy rate was 56.95%, with 2,041 literates.

== Government and politics ==
The village is administered by the Amaravathi Mandal Parishad at the intermediate level of panchayat raj institutions.

== Education ==
As per the school information report for the academic year 2018–19, the village has a total of 4 Zilla/Mandal Parishad.
