= Didugu =

- Village
- Interactive map of Didugu
- Location in Andhra Pradesh, India
- Coordinates: 16.34527°N 80.17588°E
- Country: India
- State: Andhra Pradesh
- District: Palnadu
- Mandal: Amaravathi

Government
  - Type: Panchayati raj
  - Body: Didugu Gram Panchayat

Area
  - Total: 2,352 km^{2} (908 sq mi)

Population (2011)
  - Total: 3,152
  - Density: 1.340/km^{2} (3.471/sq mi)

Languages
  - Official: Telugu
- Time zone: UTC+5:30 (IST)
- PIN: 522020
- Area code: +91–8640
- Vehicle registration: AP

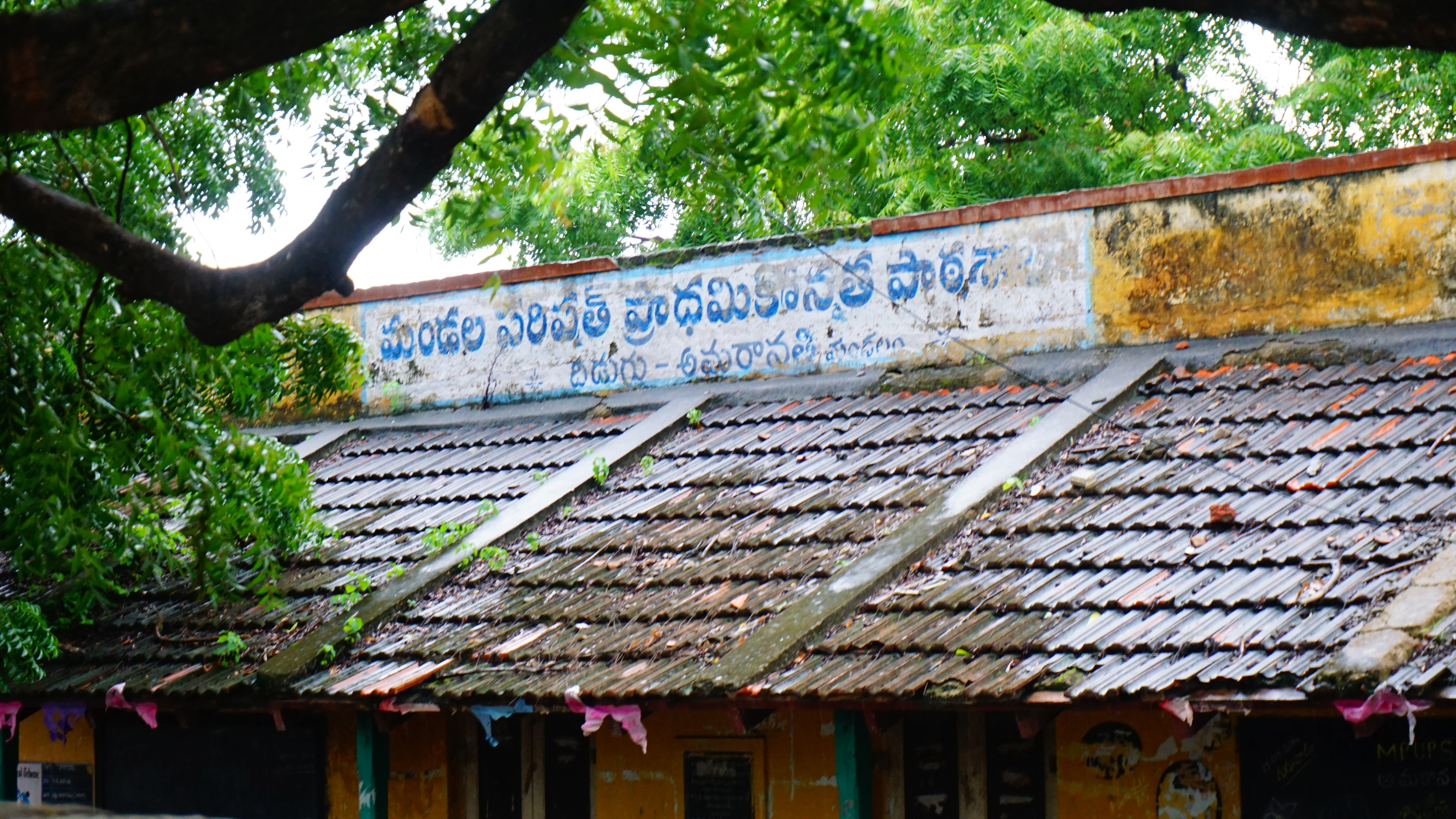
Mandal Parishad Primary School, Didugu

Didugu is a village in Palnadu district of the Indian state of Andhra Pradesh. It is located in Amaravathi mandal of Guntur revenue division. The village forms a part of Andhra Pradesh Capital Region, under the jurisdiction of APCRDA.

== Geography ==
Didugu is situated to the west of the mandal headquarters, Amaravathi, at 16.34527°N 80.17588°E. It is spread over an area of 2,352 ha (5,810 acres).

== Demographics ==
As of 2011 Census of India, Didugu had a population of 3,152. The total population constitute, 1,580 males and 1,572 females with a sex ratio of 995 females per 1000 males. 336 children are in the age group of 0–6 years, with child sex ratio of 846 girls per 1000 boys. The average literacy rate stands at 53.69% with 1789 literates.

== Government and politics ==
Didugu Gram Panchayat is the local self-government of the village. There are wards, each represented by an elected ward member. The sarpanch is elected by the ward members, though the office is presently vacant. The village is administered by the Amaravathi Mandal Parishad at the intermediate level of panchayat raj institutions.

== Education ==
As per the school information report for the academic year 2018–19, the village has a total of 2 schools. These schools include one MPP and one private school.
