= Unguturu =

Unguturu may refer to:

- Unguturu, Palnadu district, a village in Guntur district, Andhra Pradesh, India
- Unguturu, Krishna district, a village in Krishna district, Andhra Pradesh, India
- Unguturu, Eluru district, a village in Eluru district, Andhra Pradesh, India
- Unguturu Assembly constituency, one of 14 constituencies from West Godavari district in the Andhra Pradesh Legislative Assembly in India
