= Rentapalla =

- Village
- Interactive map of Rentapalla
- Location in Andhra Pradesh, India Rentapalla (India)
- Coordinates: 16°28′20″N 80°08′03″E
- Country: India
- State: Andhra Pradesh
- District: Palnadu
- Mandal: Sattenepalle

Population
  - Total: 5,300

Languages
  - Official: Telugu
- Time zone: UTC+5:30 (IST)
- 522403: 522403

Rentapalla is a village in Palnadu district of the Indian state of Andhra Pradesh. It is located in Sattenapalle mandal of Guntur revenue division. It is one of the villages in the mandal to be a part of Andhra Pradesh Capital Region.

== Geography ==
Rentapalla is located at (16.45, 80.016667),
