= Narukullapadu =

- Village
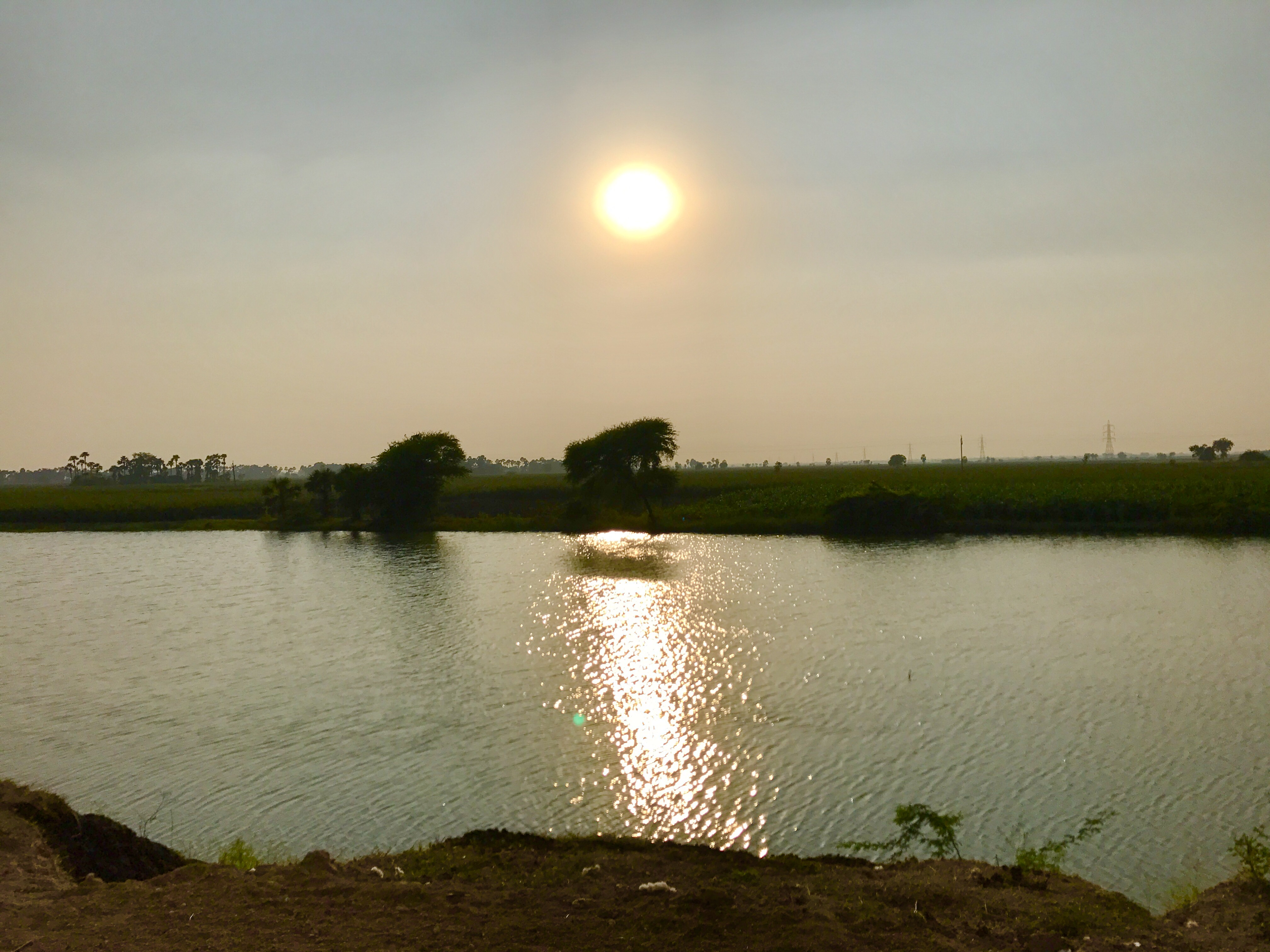
- Narukullapadu pond
- Interactive map of Narukullapadu
- Location in Andhra Pradesh, India
- Coordinates: 16.454°N 80.377°E
- Country: India
- State: Andhra Pradesh
- District: Palnadu
- Mandal: Amaravathi

Government
  - Type: Panchayati raj
  - Body: Narukullapadu Gram Panchayat

Area
  - Total: 941 km^{2} (363 sq mi)

Population (2011)
  - Total: 2,335
  - Density: 2.48/km^{2} (6.43/sq mi)

Languages
  - Official: Telugu
- Time zone: UTC+5:30 (IST)
- PIN: 522025
- Area code: +91–8640
- Vehicle registration: AP

Narukullapadu is a village in Palnadu district of the Indian state of Andhra Pradesh. It is located in Amaravathi mandal of Guntur revenue division. Kondaveeti Vagu river flows through the village, which frequently floods causing significant damage to crops and risking lives. The village forms a part of Andhra Pradesh Capital Region, under the jurisdiction of APCRDA.

== Geography ==
Malladi is situated to the south of the mandal headquarters, Amaravathi, at 16.454°N 80.377°E. It is spread over an area of 941 ha (2,330 acres).

== Demographics ==
As of 2011 Census of India, Narukullapadu had a population of 2,335. The total population constitutes 1127 males and 1208 females —a sex ratio of 1023 females per 1000 males. 238 children are in the age group of 0–6 years, with child sex ratio of 1003 girls per 1000 boys. The average literacy rate stands at 59.50% with 1,287 literates.

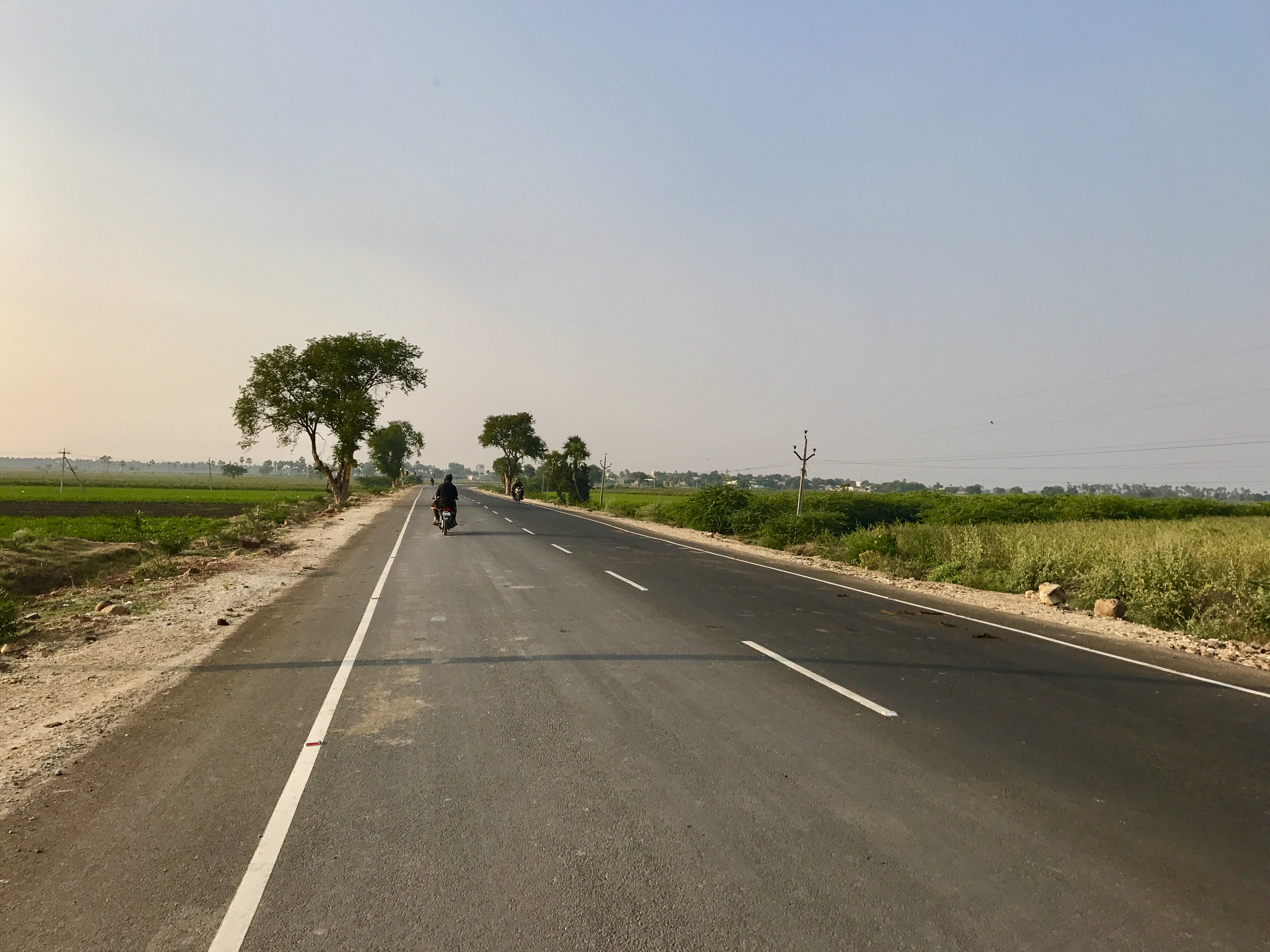
A view of Narukullapadu from Endroyi

== Government and politics ==
Narukullapadu Gram Panchayat is the local self-government of the village. There are wards, each represented by an elected ward member. The sarpanch is elected by the ward members, though the office is presently vacant. The village is administered by the Amaravathi Mandal Parishad at the intermediate level of panchayat raj institutions.

== Education ==
As per the school information report for the academic year 2018–19, the village has a total of 2 MPP schools.
