= Mandepudi =

- Village
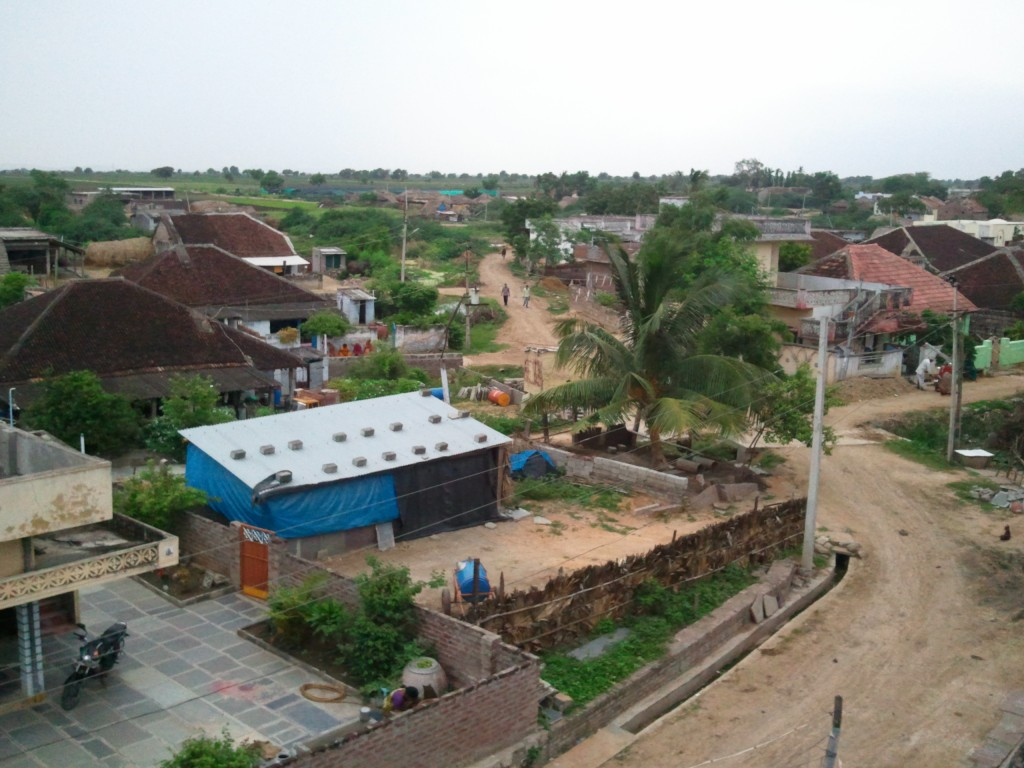
- Mandepudi village view
- Interactive map of Mandepudi
- Location in Andhra Pradesh, India Mandepudi (India)
- Coordinates: 16°28′11″N 80°19′52″E
- Country: India
- State: Andhra Pradesh
- District: Palnadu

Languages
  - Official: Telugu
- Time zone: UTC+5:30 (IST)
- PIN: 522018
- Telephone code: 08641
- Vehicle registration: AP 07, AP 08

Mandepudi is a village in Palnadu district of the Indian state of Andhra Pradesh. It is located in Amaravathi mandal of Guntur revenue division.
