= Nandigama (disambiguation) =

Nandigama may refer a town in Krishna district of Andhra Pradesh, India

- Nandigama, Guntur district
- Nandigam, Srikakulam
- Nandigam, Vizianagaram
