= Endroyi =

- Village
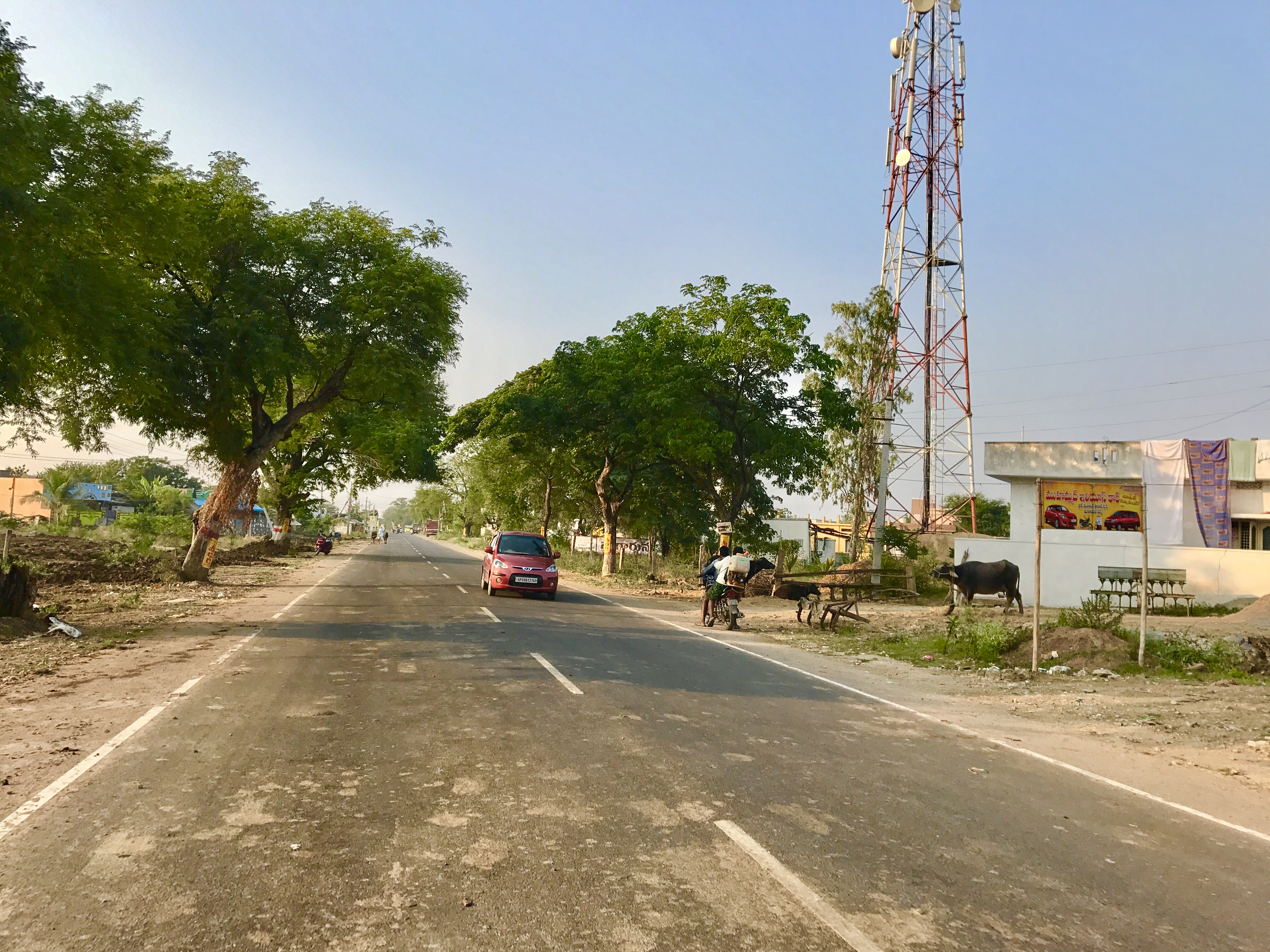
- Amaravathi Road in village
- Interactive map of Endroyi
- Location in Andhra Pradesh, India
- Coordinates: 16.45486°N 80.377372°E
- Country: India
- State: Andhra Pradesh
- District: Palnadu
- Mandal: Amaravathi

Government
  - Type: Panchayati raj
  - Body: Endroyi Gram Panchayat

Area
  - Total: 877 km^{2} (339 sq mi)

Population (2011)
  - Total: 2,703
  - Density: 3.08/km^{2} (7.98/sq mi)

Languages
  - Official: Telugu
- Time zone: UTC+5:30 (IST)
- PIN: 522025
- Area code: +91–8640
- Vehicle registration: AP

Endroyi is a village in Palnadu district of the Indian state of Andhra Pradesh. It is located in Amaravathi mandal of Guntur revenue division. The village forms a part of Andhra Pradesh Capital Region, under the jurisdiction of APCRDA.

== Geography ==
Endroyi is situated to the south of the mandal headquarters, Amaravathi, at 16.45486°N 80.377372°E. It is spread over an area of 2,703 ha (6,680 acres).

== Demographics ==
As of 2011 Census of India, Endroyi had a population of 2,703. The total population constitutes 1,358 males and 1,345 females —a sex ratio of 990 females per 1000 males. 263 children are in the age group of 0–6 years, with child sex ratio of 1071 girls per 1000 boys. The average literacy rate stands at 62.50% with 1,525 literates.

== Government and politics ==
Endroyi Gram Panchayat is the local self-government of the village. The village is divided into wards, each of which is represented by an elected ward member. The members in turn elected a sarpanch. The village is administered by the Amaravathi Mandal Parishad at the intermediate level of panchayat raj institutions.

== Education ==
As per the school information report for the academic year 2018–19, the village has a total of 3 schools. These schools include 2 MPP and one private school.
