= Nemalikallu =

- Village
- Interactive map of Nemalikallu
- Location in Andhra Pradesh, India
- Coordinates: 16°28′30″N 80°21′15″E
- Country: India
- State: Andhra Pradesh
- District: Palnadu
- Mandal: Amaravathi

Government
  - Type: Panchayati raj
  - Body: Nemalikallu Gram Panchayat

Area
  - Total: 1,439 km^{2} (556 sq mi)

Population (2011)
  - Total: 5,812
  - Density: 4.039/km^{2} (10.46/sq mi)

Languages
  - Official: Telugu
- Time zone: UTC+5:30 (IST)
- PIN: 522025
- Area code: +91–8640
- Vehicle registration: AP

Nemalikallu is a village in Palnadu district of the Indian state of Andhra Pradesh. It is located in Amaravathi mandal of Guntur revenue division. The village forms a part of Andhra Pradesh Capital Region, under the jurisdiction of APCRDA.

== Geography ==
Nemalikallu is situated to the south of the mandal headquarters, Amaravathi, at 16°28′30″N 80°21′15″E. It is spread over an area of 1,439 ha (3,560 acres).

== Government and politics ==
Nemalikallu Gram Panchayat is the local self-government model of the village, which is divided into wards, each represented by an elected ward member. The present sarpanch is Haribabu, elected by the ward members. The village is administered by the Amaravathi Mandal Parishad at the intermediate level of panchayat raj institutions.

== Education ==
As per the school information report for the academic year 2018–19, the village has a total of 7 Zilla/Mandal Parishad.
