= Malladi =

Malladi is name of a village in Palnadu district (erstwhile Guntur district) of the Indian state of Andhra Pradesh, and is also a Telugu surname.

== People ==
- Malladi Brothers, Malladi Sreeramprasad and Malladi Ravikumar, are a Carnatic music vocalist duo.
- Malladi Amulya, is an author.
- Malladi Chandrasekhara Sastry, a scholar in the Vedas and Puranas texts.
- Malladi Ramakrishna Sastry, Telugu writer and lyricist.
- Malladi Satyalingam Naicker, founder of M.S.N.Charities by his will.
- Malladi Venkata Krishna Murthy is a Telugu writer.
- Malladi Lakshmi Narayana is a very popular Telugu Astrologer.
- Malladi Vasudev is a famous lawyer, & Past Dist. Governor in Rotary International.

Malladi Srinivas is a scientist working on cancer metastasis and treatment.

== Place ==
- Malladi, Guntur district, a village in Guntur district of Andhra Pradesh
