= Pedda Madduru =

- Village
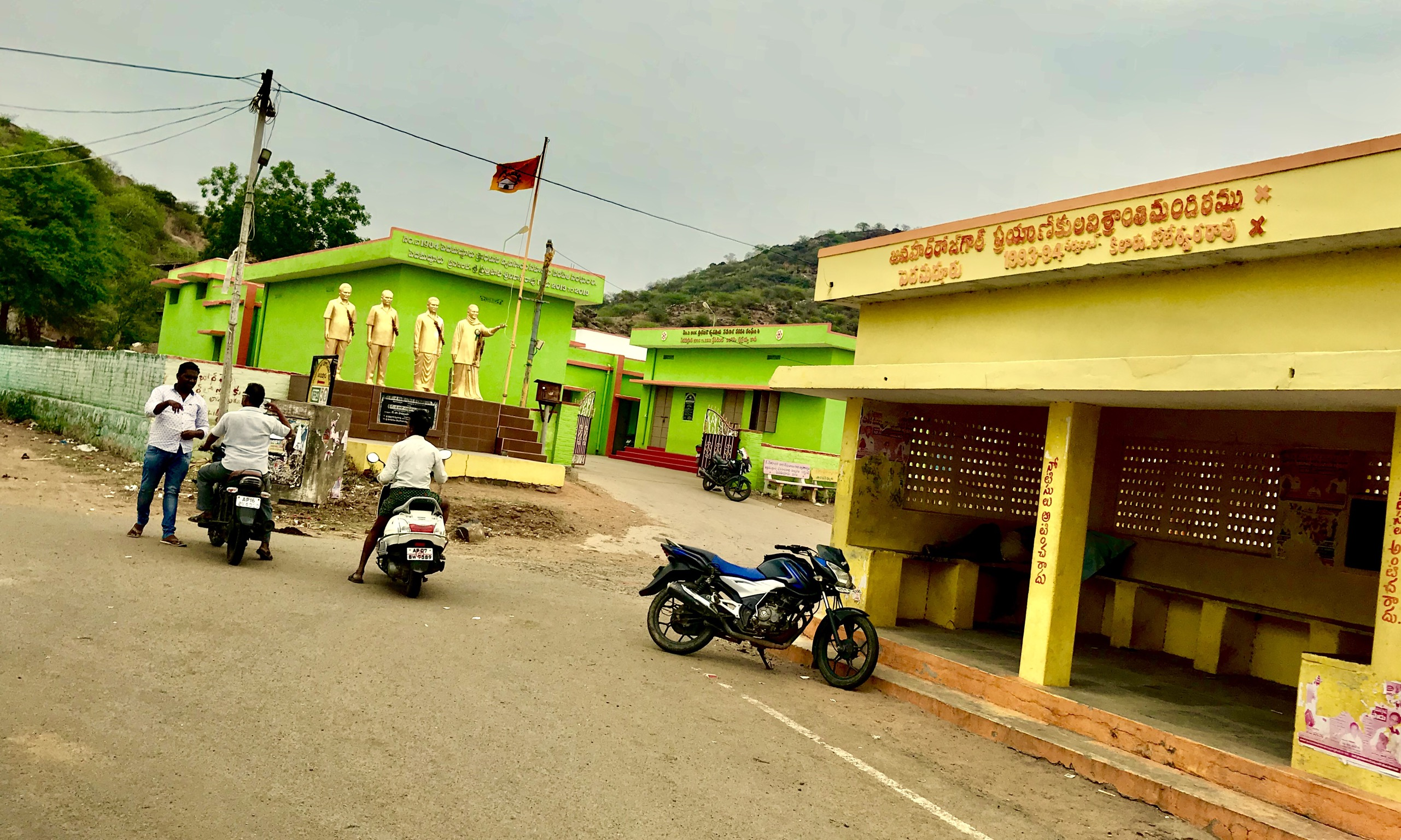
- Bus stop in Pedamadduru
- Interactive map of Pedda Madduru
- Location in Andhra Pradesh, India
- Coordinates: 16.5651°N 80.4076°E
- Country: India
- State: Andhra Pradesh
- District: Palnadu
- Mandal: Amaravathi

Government
  - Type: Panchayati raj
  - Body: Pedda Madduru Gram Panchayat

Area
  - Total: 464 km^{2} (179 sq mi)

Population (2011)
  - Total: 1,400
  - Density: 3.0/km^{2} (7.8/sq mi)

Languages
  - Official: Telugu
- Time zone: UTC+5:30 (IST)
- PIN: 522020
- Area code: +91–8640
- Vehicle registration: AP

Pedamadduru is a village in Palnadu district of the Indian state of Andhra Pradesh. It is located in Amaravathi mandal of Guntur revenue division. The village forms a part of Andhra Pradesh Capital Region, under the jurisdiction of APCRDA.

== Geography ==
Pedda Madduru is situated to the southeast of the mandal headquarters, Amaravathi, at 16°28′30″N 80°21′15″E. It is spread over an area of 464 ha (1,150 acres).

== Demographics ==
As of 2011 Census of India, Pedamadduru had a population of 1,400. The total population constitute, 699 males and 701 females a sex ratio of 1002 females per 1000 males. 146 children are in the age group of 0–6 years, with child sex ratio of 1393 girls per 1000 boys. The average literacy rate stands at 57.65% with 794 literates.

== Government and politics ==
Pedda Madduru Gram Panchayat is the local self-government of the village. There are wards, each represented by an elected ward member. The sarpanch is elected by the ward members, although the office is presently vacant. The village is administered by the Amaravathi Mandal Parishad at the intermediate level of panchayat raj institutions.

== Education ==
As per the school information report for the academic year 2018–19, the village has only one MPP school.

Podile Narasimharao upper primary school, pedamadduru.

== Transport ==
APSRTC runs buses from Vijayawada, Amaravathi and Mangalagiri.
