= Malladi, Palnadu district =

Malladi
- Village
- Location in Andhra Pradesh, India
- Coordinates: 16.5824°N 80.2782°E
- Country: India
- State: Andhra Pradesh
- District: Palnadu
- Mandal: Amaravathi

Government
  - Type: Panchayati raj
  - Body: Malladi Gram Panchayat

Area
  - Total: 572 km^{2} (221 sq mi)

Population (2011)
  - Total: 2,582
  - Density: 4.51/km^{2} (11.7/sq mi)

Languages
  - Official: Telugu
- Time zone: UTC+5:30 (IST)
- PIN: 522025
- Area code: +91–8640
- Vehicle registration: AP

Mandal Parishad Primary school of Malladi

Malladi is a village in Palnadu district of the Indian state of Andhra Pradesh. It is located in Amaravathi mandal of Sattenapalli revenue division. The village forms a part of Andhra Pradesh Capital Region, under the jurisdiction of APCRDA.

== Geography ==
Malladi is situated to the west of the mandal headquarters, Amaravathi, at 16.5824°N 80.2782°E. It is spread over an area of 2,582 ha (6,380 acres). This village and the surrounding areas of Amaravathi have a continuous history of at least 2,300 years.

== Demographics ==
As of 2011 Census of India, the village had a population of 2,582. The total population comprised 1,247 males and 1,335 females —a sex ratio of 1071 females per 1000 males. 289 children were in the age group of 0–6 years, of which 144 were boys and 145 were girls —a ratio of 1007 per 1000. The average literacy rate was 59.83% (with 1,372 literates), significantly lower than the state average of 67.41%.

== Government and politics ==
Malladi Gram Panchayat is the local self-government of the village. There are wards, each represented by an elected ward member. The present sarpanch is vacant, elected by the ward members. The village is administered by the Amaravathi Mandal Parishad at the intermediate level of panchayat raj institutions.

== Education ==
As per the school information report for the academic year 2018–19, the village has a total of 4 Zilla/Mandal Parishad.
