= Unguturu, Palnadu district =

Unguturu
- Village
- Interactive map of Unguturu
- Location in Andhra Pradesh, India
- Coordinates: 16.4939°N 80.3644°E
- Country: India
- State: Andhra Pradesh
- District: Palnadu
- Mandal: Amaravathi

Government
  - Type: Panchayati raj
  - Body: Unguturu Gram Panchayat

Area
  - Total: 1,033 km^{2} (399 sq mi)

Population (2011)
  - Total: 2,768
  - Density: 2.680/km^{2} (6.940/sq mi)

Languages
  - Official: Telugu
- Time zone: UTC+5:30 (IST)
- PIN: 522016
- Area code: +91–8645
- Vehicle registration: AP

Unguturu is a village in Palnadu district of the Indian state of Andhra Pradesh. It is located in Amaravathi mandal of Guntur revenue division. The village forms a part of Andhra Pradesh Capital Region, under the jurisdiction of APCRDA.

== Geography ==
Unguturu is situated to the south of the mandal headquarters, Amaravathi, at 16.4939°N 80.3644°E. It is spread over an area of 1,033 ha (2,550 acres).

== Demographics ==
As of 2011 Census of India, the village had a population of 2,768 . The total population constitute, 1369 males and 1399 females with a sex ratio of 1022 females per 1000 males. 278 children are in the age group of 0–6 years, with a ratio of 904 per 1000. The average literacy rate stands at 63.09% significantly lower than the state average of 67.41%.

== Government and politics ==
Unguturu Gram Panchayat is the local self-government structure of the village. There are wards, each represented by an elected ward member. The sarpanch is elected by the ward members, although the office is presently vacant. The village is administered by the Amaravathi Mandal Parishad at the intermediate level of panchayat raj institutions.

== Education ==
As per the school information report for the academic year 2018–19, the village has a total of 2 MPP schools.
