= Sattenapalle mandal =

- Mandal
- Interactive map outlining mandal
- Location in Andhra Pradesh, India
- Country: India
- State: Andhra Pradesh
- District: Palnadu
- Headquarters: Sattenapalle

Government
  - Body: Mandal Parishad
  - Tehsildar: K.V.Srinivasa Rao

Population (2011)
  - Total: 130,608

Languages
  - Official: Telugu
- Time zone: UTC+5:30 (IST)

Mandal map of Guntur district showing Sattenapalle mandal (in green)

Sattenapalle mandal is one of the mandals in Palnadu district of the Indian state of Andhra Pradesh. It is under the administration of Sattenapalli revenue division and the headquarters are located at Sattenapalle. The mandal is bounded by Krosuru, Pedakurapadu, Rajupalem, Medikonduru, Muppalla and Phirangipuram.And it is a part of APCRDA also comes under capital region

== Demographics ==
As of 2011 census, the mandal had a population of 130,608. The total population constitute, 64,764 males and 65,844 females —a sex ratio of 1017 females per 1000 males. 13,482 children are in the age group of 0–6 years, of which 6,979 are boys and 6,503 are girls —a ratio of 932 girls per 1000 boys. The average literacy rate stands at 63.43% with 74,291 literates.

== Administration ==
The mandal is partially a part of the Andhra Pradesh Capital Region under the jurisdiction of APCRDA. It is under the control of a tahsildar and the present tahsildar is K.V.Srinivasa Rao. Sattenapalle mandal is one of the 4 mandals under Sattenapalle (Assembly constituency), which in turn represents Narasaraopet (Lok Sabha constituency) of Andhra Pradesh.

== Settlements ==
As of 2011 census, the mandal has 18 settlements, which includes 1 town and 17 villages.

The settlements in the mandal are listed below:

1. Abburu
2. Bhatlur
3. Bhimavaram
4. Bhrugubanda
5. Dhulipalla
6. Gorantla
7. Gudipudi
8. Kankanalapalle
9. Kantepudi
10. Kattavaripalem
11. Kattamuru
12. Komerapudi
13. Lakkarajugarlapadu
14. Nandigama
15. Pakalapadu
16. Panidem
17. Pedamakkena
18. Irukupalem
19. Rentapalla
20. Sattenepalle (M)

Note: M-Municipality

== Education ==
The mandal plays a major role in education for the rural students of the nearby villages. The primary and secondary school education is imparted by government, aided and private schools, under the School Education Department of the state. As per the school information report for the academic year 2015–16, the mandal has more than 19,931 students enrolled in over 136 schools.

== Transport ==
Guntur railway station is 37 km to sattenapalle mandal.

== See also ==
- List of mandals in Andhra Pradesh
