= Amaravathi mandal, Andhra Pradesh =

Amaravathi mandal
- Mandal
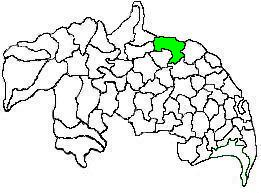
- Mandal map of Guntur district showing Amaravathi mandal (in green)
- Interactive map of Amaravathi mandal
- Location in Andhra Pradesh, India
- Coordinates: 16°34′22″N 80°21′27″E
- Country: India
- State: Andhra Pradesh
- District: Palnadu
- Headquarters: Amaravathi
- Mandal Parishad villages: 17

Government
  - Type: Panchayati raj (Block level)
  - Body: Amaravathi Mandal Parishad
  - President (MPP): Melaka Hanumantha Rao
  - MPDO: P.Madhuri
  - Tehsildar: G.Vijaya

Area
  - Total: 202.79 km^{2} (78.30 sq mi)

Population (2011)
  - Total: 66,277
  - Density: 326.83/km^{2} (846.47/sq mi)
- Time zone: UTC+5:30 (IST)

Amaravathi mandal is one of the 28 mandals in Palnadu district of the Indian state of Andhra Pradesh. It is under the administration of Sattenapalli revenue division and the headquarters are located at Amaravathi. The mandal is located on the banks of Krishna River, at a distance 27 km from the district headquarters. It is bounded by Atchampet, Krosuru, Pedakurapadu, Tadikonda and Thullur mandals.

== Demographics ==
As of 2011 census, the mandal had a population of 66,277. The total population constitute, 32,709 males and 33,568 females —a sex ratio of 1026 females per 1000 males. 6,894 children are in the age group of 0–6 years, of which 3,450 are boys and 3,444 are girls. The average literacy rate stands at 48.45% with 37,507 literates.

== Government and politics ==
=== Administration ===
The mandal forms a part of the Andhra Pradesh Capital Region, under the jurisdiction of APCRDA. The present Mandal Praja Parishad (MPP) is Mekala Hanumatha Rao, MPDO is P.Madhuri and the tahsildar is G.Vijaya. As of 2011 census, the mandal has seventeen villages.

The settlements in the mandal are listed below:

1. Amaravathi†
2. Attalur
3. Dharanikota
4. Didugu
5. Endroyi
6. Jupudi
7. Karlapudi
8. Lingapuram

Muttayapalem

1. Malladi
2. Munugodu
3. Narukullapadu
4. Nemalikallu
5. Pedda Madduru
6. Pondugala
7. Unguturu
8. Vykuntapuram
9. Enikapadu

†−Mandal headquarters

=== Politics ===
Amaravathi mandal is one of the 5 mandals under Pedakurapadu (Assembly constituency), which in turn represents Narasaraopet (Lok Sabha constituency) of Andhra Pradesh.

== See also ==
- List of mandals in Andhra Pradesh
- List of villages in Guntur district
