= Vykuntapuram =

- Village
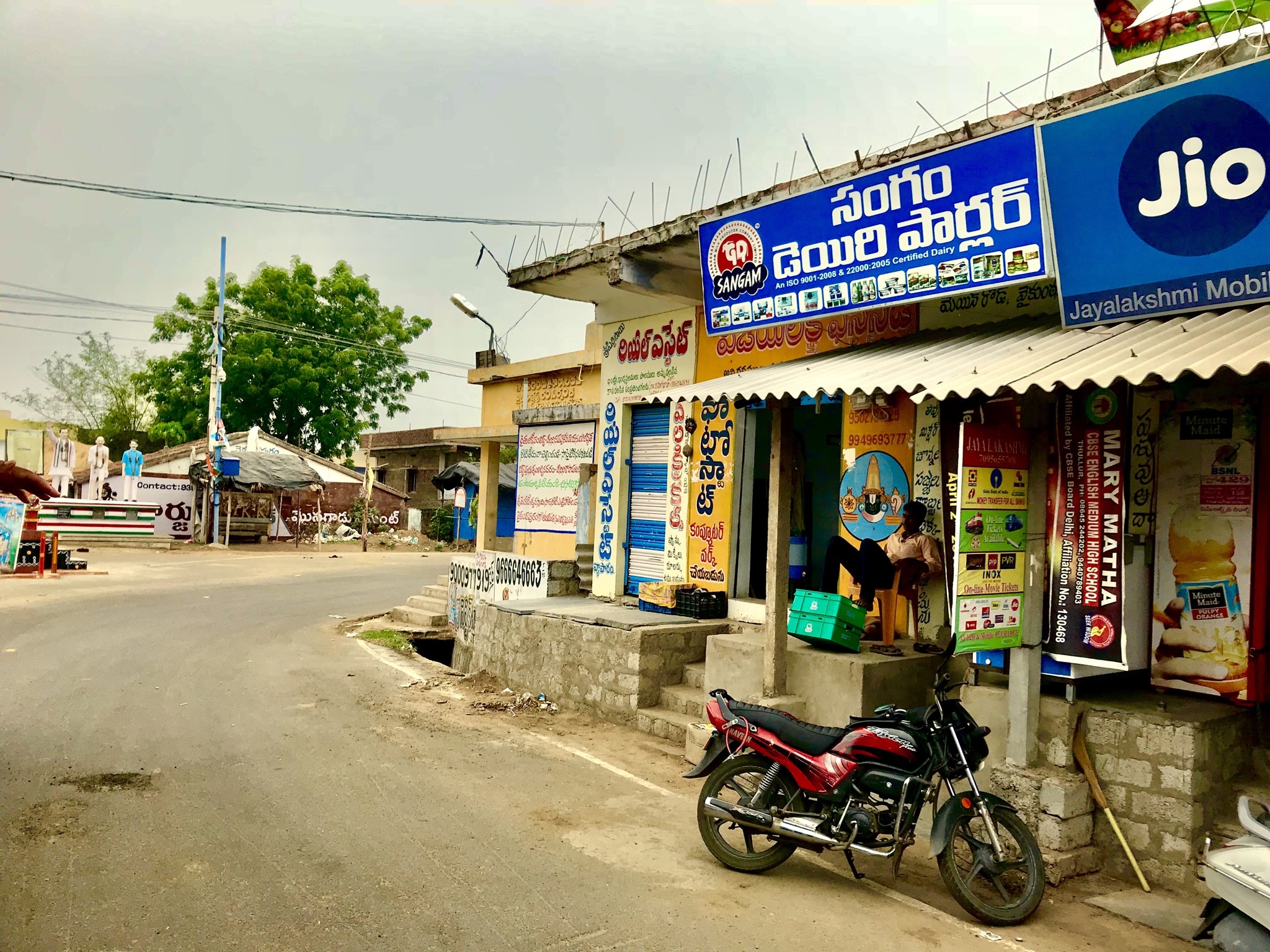
- APS RTC bus stop in Vykuntapuram
- Interactive map of Vykuntapuram
- Location in Andhra Pradesh, India
- Coordinates: 16.5651°N 80.4086°E
- Country: India
- State: Andhra Pradesh
- District: Palnadu
- Mandal: Amaravathi
- Wards: 12

Government
  - Type: Panchayati raj
  - Body: Vykuntapuram Gram Panchayat

Area
  - Total: 1,360 km^{2} (530 sq mi)

Population (2011)
  - Total: 3,126
  - Density: 2.30/km^{2} (5.95/sq mi)

Languages
  - Official: Telugu
- Time zone: UTC+5:30 (IST)
- PIN: 522020
- Area code: +91–8645
- Vehicle registration: AP

Vykuntapuram, also spelled as Vaikuntapuram, is a village in Guntur district of the Indian state of Andhra Pradesh. It is located in Amaravathi mandal of Guntur revenue division. The village forms a part of Andhra Pradesh Capital Region, under the jurisdiction of APCRDA.

== Geography ==
Vykuntapuram is situated to the east of the mandal headquarters, Amaravathi, at 16.5651°N 80.4086°E. It is spread over an area of 1,360 ha (3,400 acres). There is a proposal to construct a new barrage on the Krishna River about 23 km upstream of existing Prakasam Barrage with FRL 25M to store 10 TMC of flood water flowing from the Vyra, Munneru rivers. The back water of this barrage will extend beyond Pokkunuru up to the toe of Pulichintala dam. Andhra Pradesh Chief MinisterNara chandrababu Naidu Laid Foundation on 13 February 2019.

== Demographics ==
As of 2011 Census of India, Vykuntapuram had a population of 3,128. The total population constitute, 1,578 males and 1,548 females —a sex ratio of 981 females per 1000 males. 356 children are in the age group of 0–6 years, with child sex ratio of 914 girls per 1000 boys. The average literacy rate stands at 58.45% with 1,969 literates.

== Government and politics ==
Vykuntapuram Gram Panchayat is the local self-government of the village. There are 12 wards, each represented by an elected ward member. The present sarpanch is vacant, elected by the ward members. The village is administered by the Amaravathi Mandal Parishad at the intermediate level of panchayat raj institutions.

== Education ==
As per the school information report for the academic year 2018–19, the village has a total of 3 schools. These schools include one MPP and 2 private schools.

== Transport ==
Vykuntapuram is located on the Vijayawada-Amaravati road at a distance of 10 km from Amaravathi. APSRTC operates buses on this route from Pandit Nehru bus station of Vijayawada. A waterway categorised as class–III is planned from Pulichintala to Prakasam Barrage, connects Vykuntapuram with Ibrahimpatnam. Government is planning to build a new reservoir from Vykuntapuram hill to Damuluru in Krishna District.
