= Nandigama, Sattenapalli mandal =

Nandigama
- Village
- Interactive map of Nandigama
- Location in Andhra Pradesh, India Nandigama (India)
- Coordinates: 16.247°N 80.115°E
- Country: India
- State: Andhra Pradesh
- District: Palnadu
- Mandal: Sattenapalli

Languages
  - Official: Telugu
- Time zone: UTC+5:30 (IST)
- PIN: 522403
- Telephone code: +91-8640
- Vehicle registration: AP–16

Nandigama is a village in Palnadu district of the Indian state of Andhra Pradesh. It is located in Sattenapalle mandal.

== Geography ==
Nandigama is located at coordinates:16°24'45.0"N 80°11'24.6"E geographically.

== Demography ==
Telugu is the Local Language here. Total population(2011) of Nandigama is 6624 .Males are 2932 and Females are 3692 living in 1615 Houses. Total area of Nandigama is 1562 hectares. Nandigama village has lower literacy rate compared to Andhra Pradesh. In 2011, literacy rate of Nandigama village was 63.19% compared to 67.02% of Andhra Pradesh. In Nandigama Male literacy stands at 67.02% while female literacy rate was 60.24%.
