= Bellamkonda =

- Village
- Interactive map of Bellamkonda
- Location in Andhra Pradesh, India
- Coordinates: 16°29′32″N 80°00′32″E
- Country: India
- State: Andhra Pradesh
- District: Palnadu
- Mandal: Bellamkonda

Government
  - Type: Panchayati raj
  - Body: Bellamkonda Gram Panchayat

Area
  - Total: 2,306 ha (5,700 acres)

Population (2011)
  - Total: 10,169
  - Density: 441.0/km^{2} (1,142/sq mi)

Languages
  - Official: Telugu
- Time zone: UTC+5:30 (IST)
- PIN: 522xxx
- Area code: +91–8649
- Vehicle registration: AP

Bellamkonda is a village in Palnadu district of the Indian state of Andhra Pradesh. It is the headquarters of Bellamkonda mandal in Sattenapalli revenue division.

== Geography ==
Bellamkonda is situated at 16°29′32″N 80°00′32″E. It is spread over an area of 2,306 ha (5,700 acres).

== Demographics ==
As of 2011 census of India, the total number of households in the village were 2,467. It had a total population of 10,169, which includes 5,030 males, 5,139 females and 1,183 children in the age group of 0–6 years. The average literacy rate stands at 57.08% with 10,337 literates.

== Governance ==
Bellamkonda gram panchayat is the local self-government of the village. It is divided into wards and each ward is represented by a ward member.

== Education ==
As per the school information report for the academic year 2018–19, the village has a total of 12 schools. These schools include one KGBV, one APTWR, one private and 9 Zilla/Mandal Parishad.
