= Dharanikota =

Dharanikota Dhanyakatakam
- Village
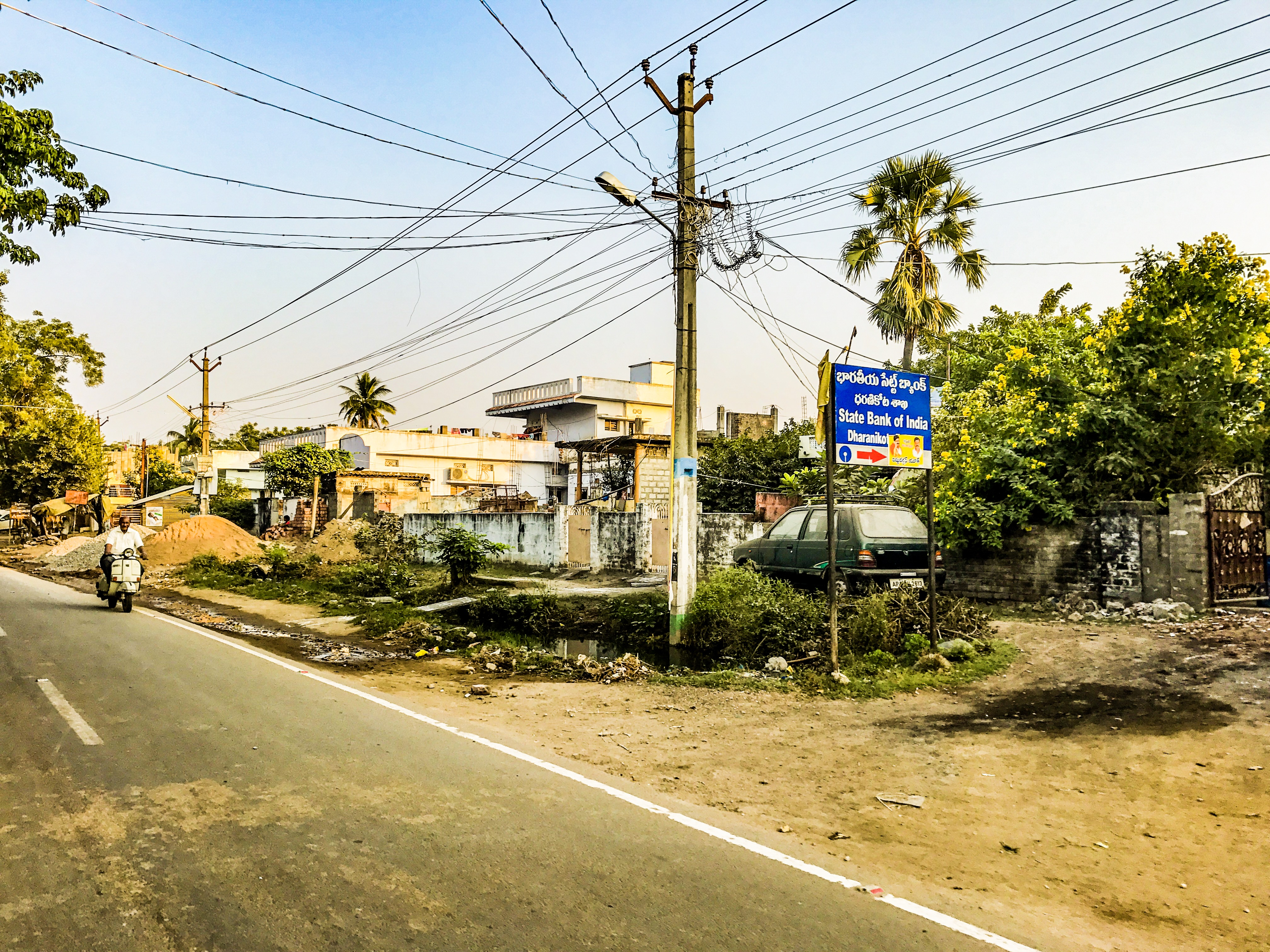
- Residential area in Dharanikota
- Nickname: Dhannakada
- Interactive map of Dharanikota
- Location in Andhra Pradesh, India Dharanikota (Andhra Pradesh)
- Coordinates: 16.5783°N 80.3482°E
- Country: India
- State: Andhra Pradesh
- District: Palnadu
- Mandal: Amaravathi mandal

Government
  - Type: Panchayati raj
  - Body: Dharanikota Gram Panchayat

Area
  - Total: 3,548 km^{2} (1,370 sq mi)

Population (2011)
  - Total: 7,534
  - Density: 2.123/km^{2} (5.500/sq mi)

Languages
  - Official: Telugu
- Time zone: UTC+5:30 (IST)
- PIN: 522436
- Area code: +91–8640
- Vehicle registration: AP
- Lok Sabha constituency: Narasaraopet
- Assembly constituency: Pedakurapadu

Dharanikota is a village in the Amaravathi mandal of Palnadu district in the Indian state of Andhra Pradesh. It is the site of ancient Dhanyakataka, which was the capital of the Satavahana dynasty that ruled in the Deccan around the 1st to 3rd centuries CE.

Dharanikota is located in Amaravathi mandal of Sattenapalli revenue division. The village forms a part of Andhra Pradesh Capital Region, under the jurisdiction of APCRDA.

== History ==
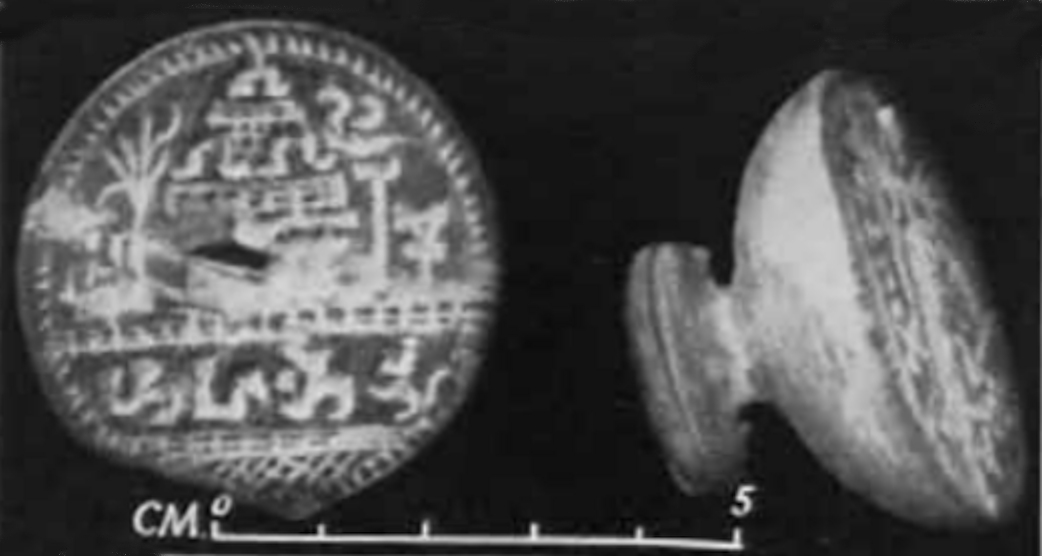
Dharanikota ivory seal

Archaeological excavations at Dharanikota revealed viharas in the city and surrounding areas. It is the site of ancient Dhanyakataka, which served as the capital of the Satavahana dynasty who were also called Andhras, that ruled the Deccan between the 1st and 3rd centuries CE. It was also the capital of the Kota Vamsa, which ruled during the medieval period until the mid-12th century.

Mahayana expansion in Asia, from heartland in Andhra

Crucially, this was the region where Mahayana Buddhism was developed by monk Nagarjuna, evolving from the local schools of the Krishna River Valley to eventually transform the Buddhist world. The place is famous for the great Amaravati stupa, a very large Kalachakra ceremony was conducted there by the Dalai Lama in January 2006.

The Chinese traveler Xuanzang reportedly visited Dharanikota and the Amaravati Stupa, writing an enthusiastic account of the flourishing viharas that existed then. Jainism also flourished in Dharanikota during the reign of the Sada kings.

== Geography ==
Dharanikota is situated to the west of the mandal headquarters, Amaravathi, at 16.579444°N 80.311111°E. It is spread over an area of 1,524 ha (3,770 acres).

== Demographics ==
As of 2011 Census of India, Dharanikota had a population of 7,534. The total population constitute, 3,734 males and 3,800 females —a sex ratio of 1018 females per 1000 males. 725 children are in the age group of 0–6 years, of which 368 are boys and 357 are girls —a ratio of 970 per 1000. The average literacy rate stands at 66.06% with 4,498 literates, slightly lower than the state average of 67.41%.

== Government and politics ==
Dharanikota Gram Panchayat is the local self-government of the village. It is divided into wards and each ward is represented by a ward member. The village is administered by the Amaravathi Mandal Parishad at the intermediate level of panchayat raj institutions.

== Education ==
As per the school information report for the academic year 2018–19, the village has eight schools, including five MPP and three private schools.
