= Rajupalem, Palnadu district =

Rajupalem
- Village
- Interactive map of Rajupalem
- Location in Andhra Pradesh, India
- Coordinates: 16.4616°N 80.0157°E
- Country: India
- State: Andhra Pradesh
- District: Palnadu
- Mandal: Rajupalem

Government
  - Type: Panchayati raj
  - Body: Rajupalem gram panchayat

Area
  - Total: 1,178 ha (2,910 acres)

Population (2011)
  - Total: 4,139
  - Density: 351.4/km^{2} (910.0/sq mi)

Languages
  - Official: Telugu
- Time zone: UTC+5:30 (IST)
- PIN: 522xxx
- Area code: +91–
- Vehicle registration: AP

Rajupalem is a village in Palnadu district of the Indian state of Andhra Pradesh. It is located in Rajupalem mandal of Sattenapalli revenue division.

== Government and politics ==
Rajupalem gram panchayat is the local self-government of the village. It is divided into wards and each ward is represented by a ward member. The ward members are headed by a Sarpanch.
