= Amaravati art =

Ancient Indian art style

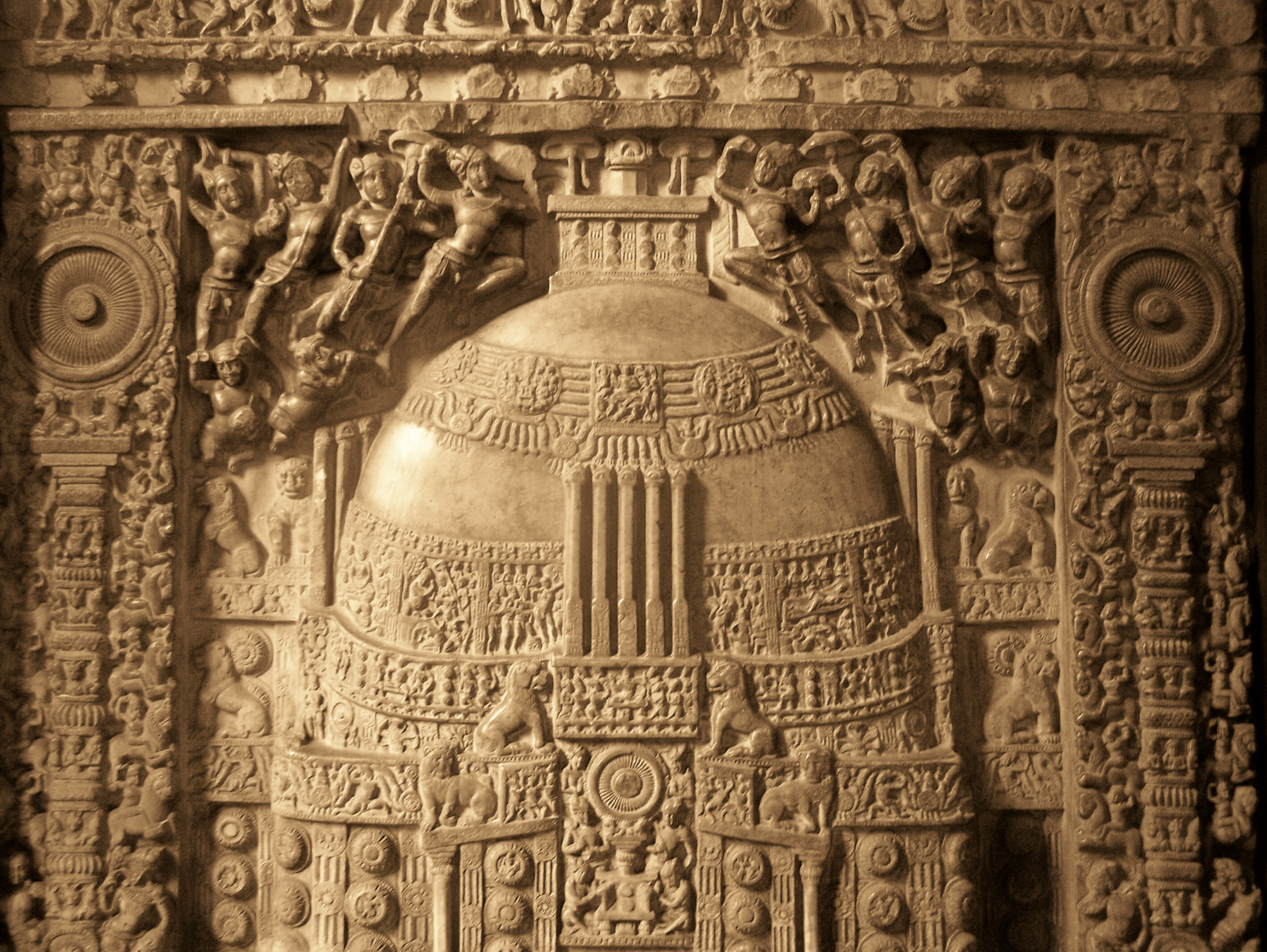
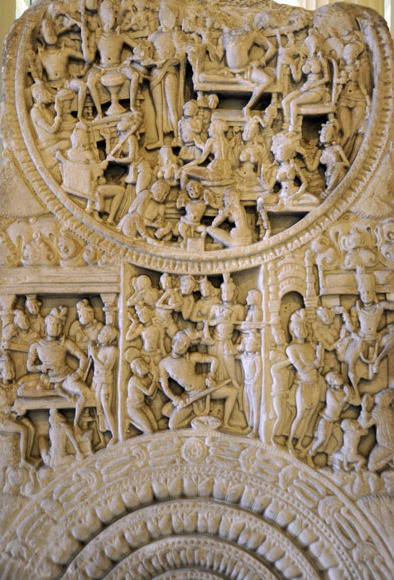
- Top: Amaravati Maha Stupa relief, 1st–2nd century CE; Bottom: Limestone railing pillar from Amaravati
- Years active: 2nd century BCE–3rd century CE
- Location: South Asia; Southeast Asia

Amaravati school of art is an ancient Indian art style that evolved in the region of Amaravati (then known as Dhānyakaṭaka) in the modern-day Andhra Pradesh from 2nd century BCE to the end of the 3rd century CE. It is also called the Andhra School or Vengi School. Art historians regard the art of Amaravati as one of the three major styles or schools of ancient Indian art, the other two being the Mathura style, and the Gandharan style.

In addition to the ruins at Amarāvati, the style is also seen in the stupa remains at Bhattiprolu, Jaggayyapeta, Nagarjunakonda, Ghantasala, and Goli, in Andhra Pradesh, and as far west as Ter, Maharashtra. Largely because of the maritime trading links of the East Indian coast, the Amaravati school of sculpture had great influence on art in South India, Sri Lanka (as seen at Anuradhapura) and South-East Asia.

== Characteristics ==
Buddha image in sculptures which later on became the prototype of images in different Buddhist countries was standardised here. The Amaravati style of Buddha image retained its popularity in Sri Lanka till the 12th century.

== See also ==
- Amaravati Stupa
- Gandharan Art
- Buddhist art
- Index of Buddhism-related articles
- History of Buddhism

== Bibliography ==
- Rowland, Benjamin (1967). The Art and Architecture of India: Buddhist, Hindu, Jain (3rd ed.). Pelican History of Art, Penguin. ISBN 0140561021.
