= Krosuru =

Mandal or block in palnadu district of Andhra Pradesh, India

- Mandal and having 19 Villages and 16 Panchayats
- Interactive map of Krosuru
- Location in Andhra Pradesh, India
- Coordinates: 16°33′00″N 80°07′59″E
- Country: India
- State: Andhra Pradesh
- District: Palnadu district
- Mandal: Krosuru

Government
  - Type: Panchayati raj
  - Body: Krosuru gram panchayat

Area
  - Total: 2,431 ha (6,010 acres)

Population (2011)
  - Total: 11,549
  - Density: 475.1/km^{2} (1,230/sq mi)

Languages
  - Official: Telugu
- Time zone: UTC+5:30 (IST)
- PIN: 522410
- Area code: +91–8640
- Vehicle registration: AP

Krosuru is a village in Palnadu district of the Indian state of Andhra Pradesh. It is the mandal headquarters of Krosuru mandal in Sattenapalli revenue division.

== Geography ==
Krosuru is situated at 16°33′00″N 80°07′59″E. It is spread over an area of 2,431 ha (6,010 acres).

== Demographics ==
As of 2011 Census of India, Krosuru had a population of 11,549. The total population constitute, 5,651 males and 5,898 females —a sex ratio of 1044 females per 1000 males. 1,202 children are in the age group of 0–6 years, of which 602 are boys and 600 are girls —a ratio of 997 per 1000. The average literacy rate stands at 63.20% with 6,539 literates, significantly higher than the state average of 67.41%.

== Governance ==
Krosuru gram panchayat is the local self-government of the village. It is divided into wards and each ward is represented by a ward member. The village forms a part of Andhra Pradesh Capital Region and is under the jurisdiction of APCRDA.

== Education ==
As per the school information report for the academic year 2018–19, the village has a total of 17 schools. These include one model, one KGBV, one APMSK, 8 Zilla Parishad/MPP and 6 private schools those icludes Jai Bharat Techno school], Sant anna's school .
