= Sattenapalli revenue division =

Revenue division in Palnadu district, Andhra Pradesh, India

Sattenapalli Revenue Division
- Revenue division in Palnadu district
- Country: India
- State: Andhra Pradesh
- District: Palnadu
- Formed: 4 April 2022
- Founder: Government of Andhra Pradesh
- Time zone: UTC+05:30 (IST)

Sattenapalli Revenue Division is an administrative division in the Palnadu district of the Indian state of Andhra Pradesh. It is one of the three revenue divisions in the district and comprises 9 mandals. It was formed on 4 April 2022 along with the newly formed Palnadu district.

== Administration ==
The revenue division comprises 9 mandals: Atchampet, Amaravathi, Bellamkonda, Krosuru, Muppalla, Nekarikallu, Pedakurapadu, Rajupalem, and Sattenapalle.
