= Amaravati, Palnadu district =

Amaravati
- Village
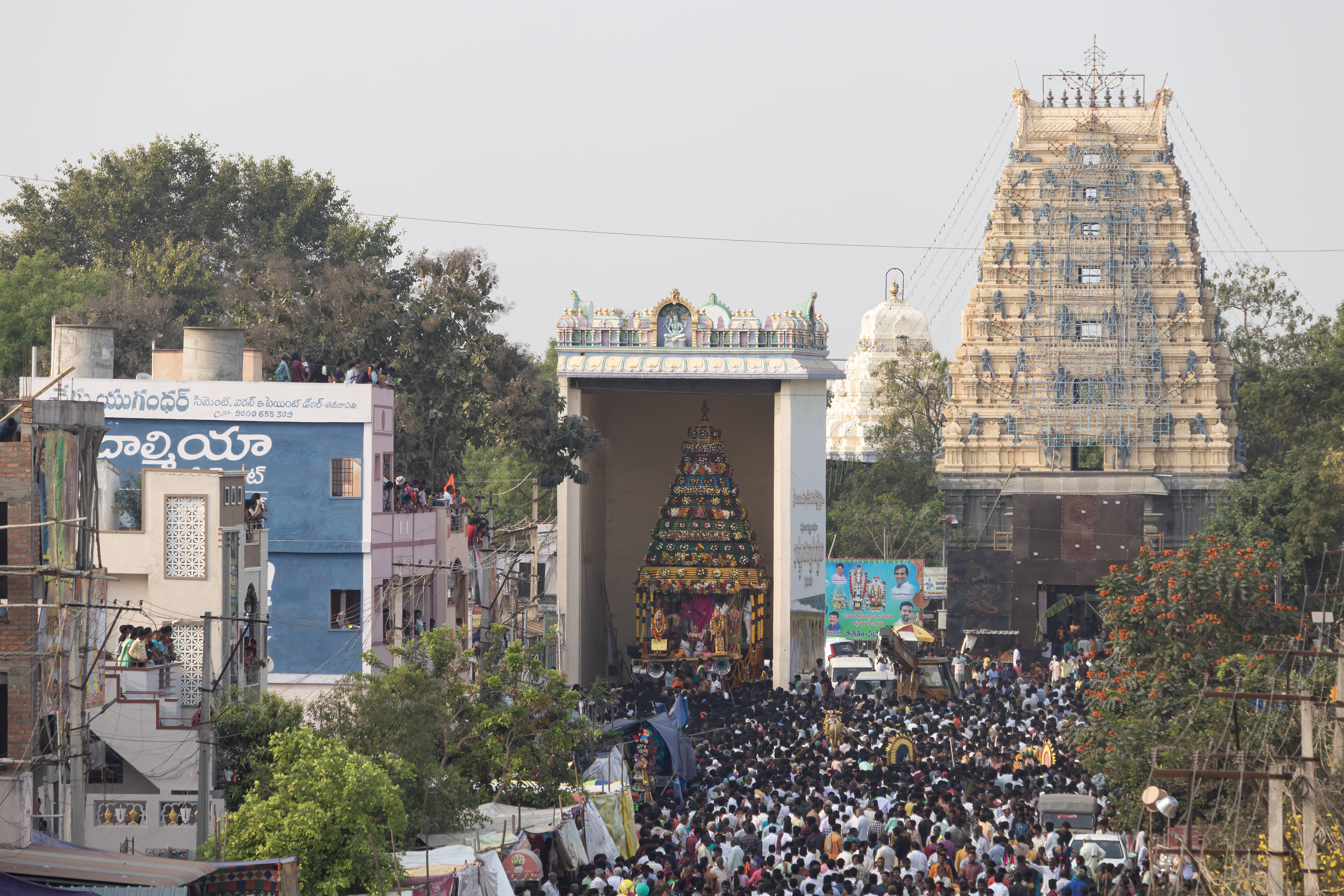
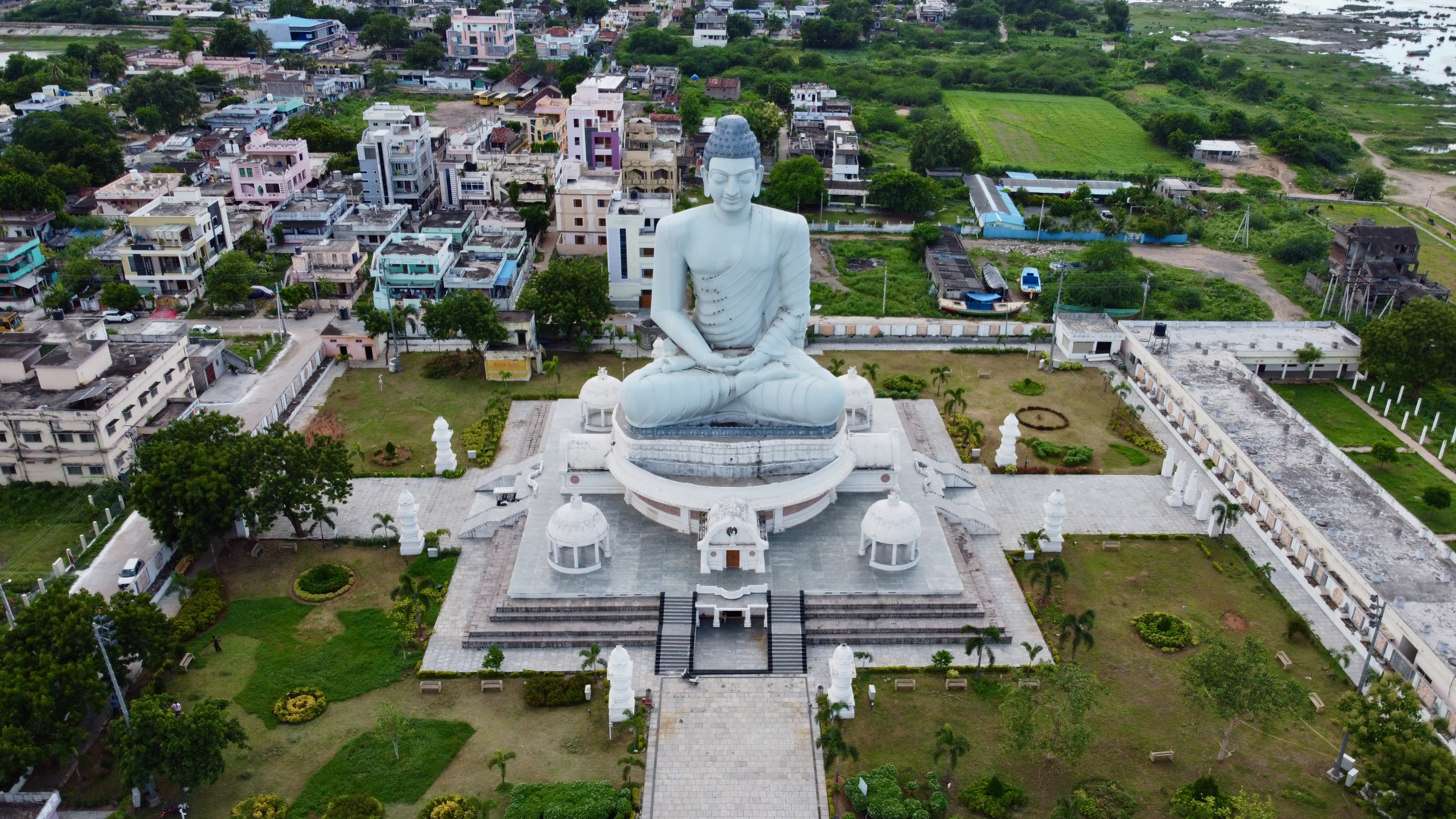
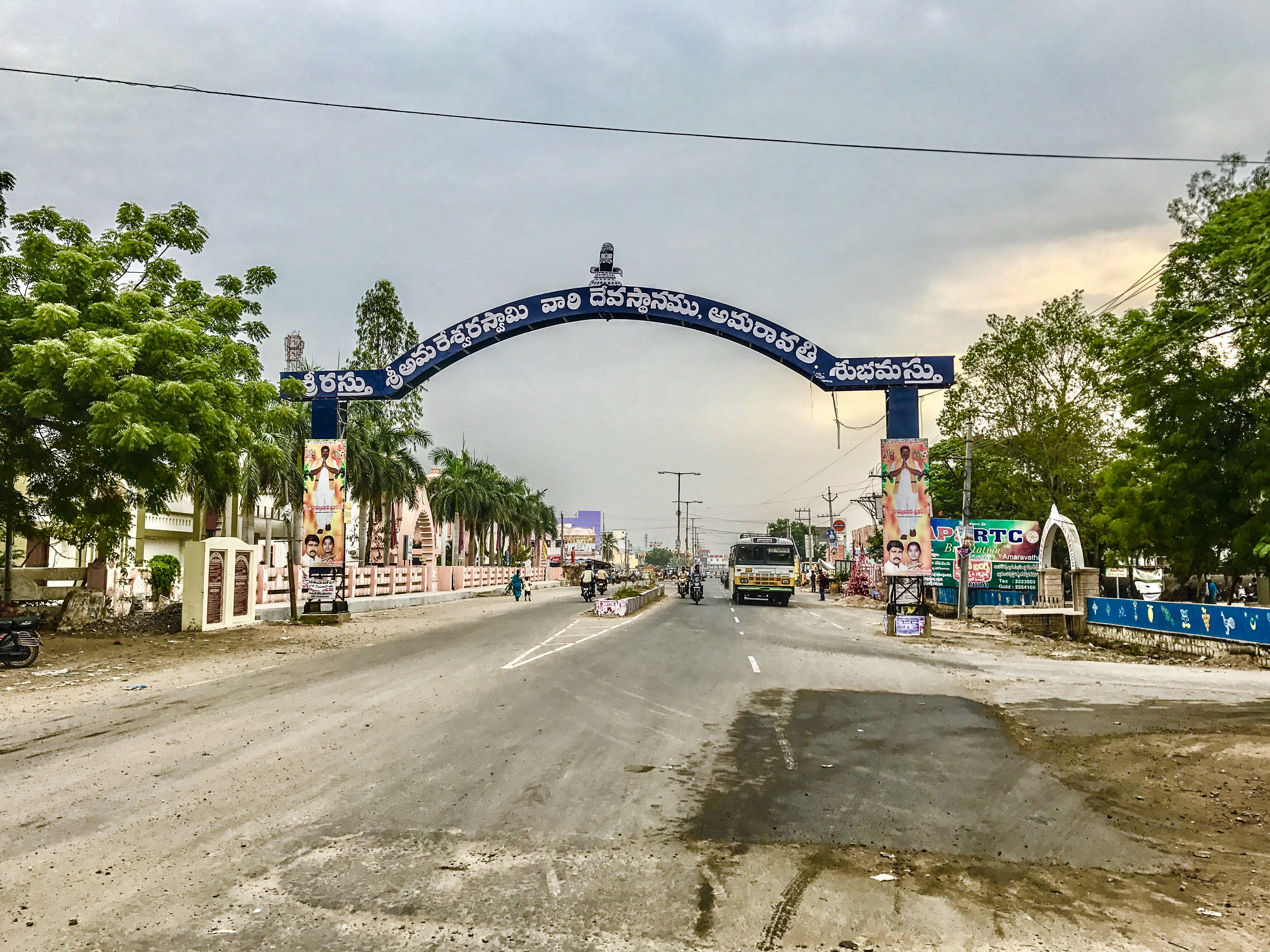
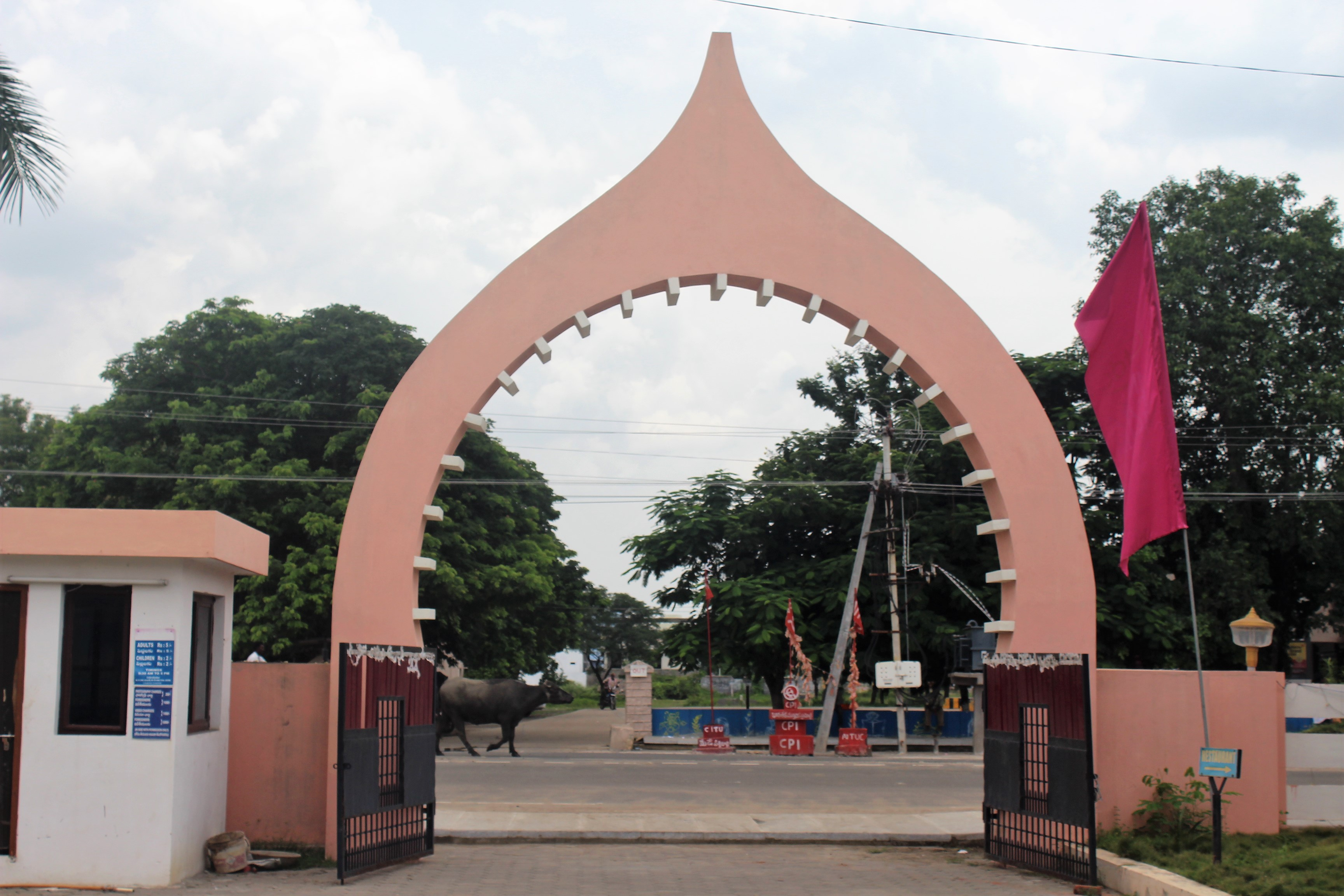
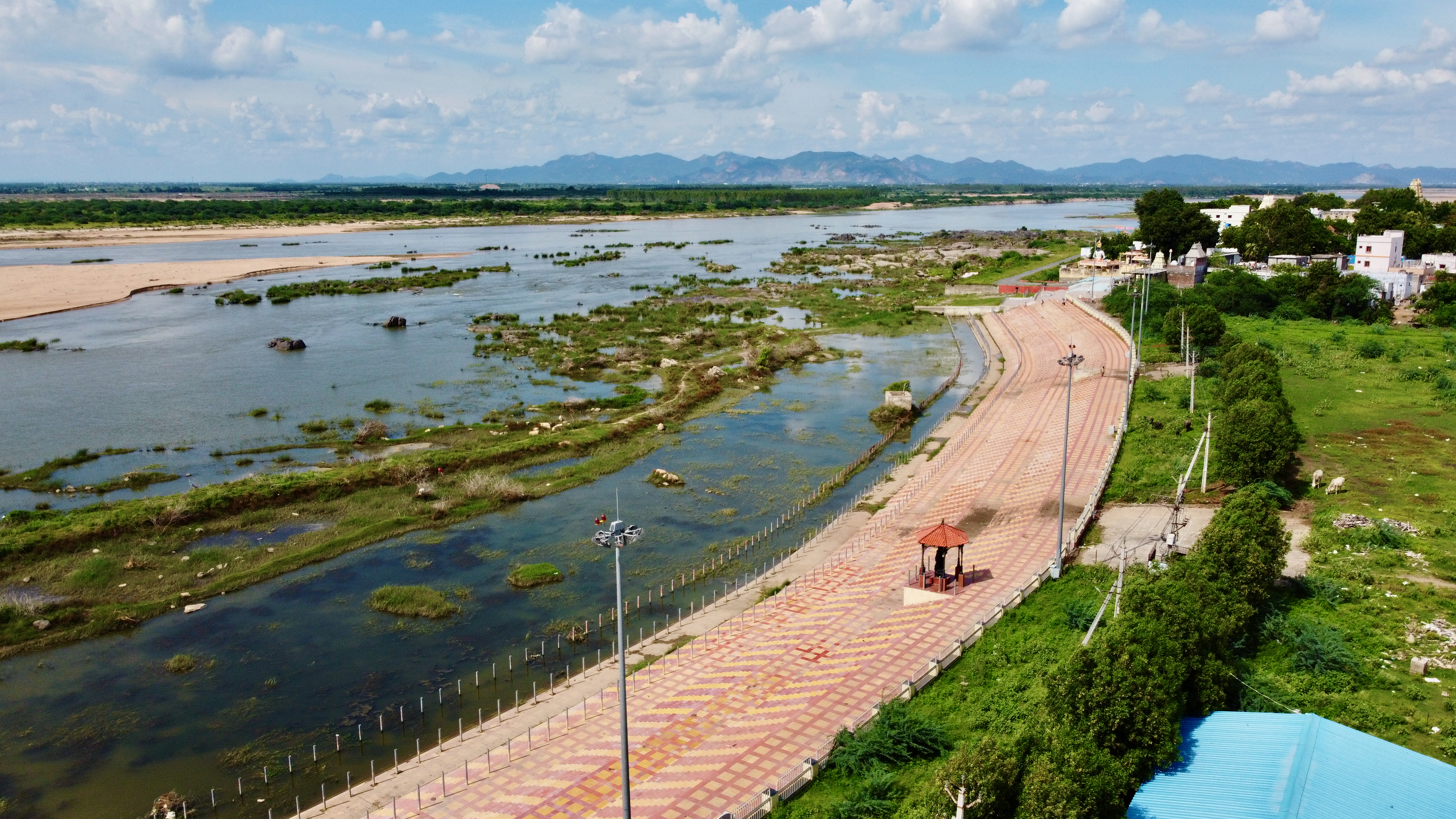
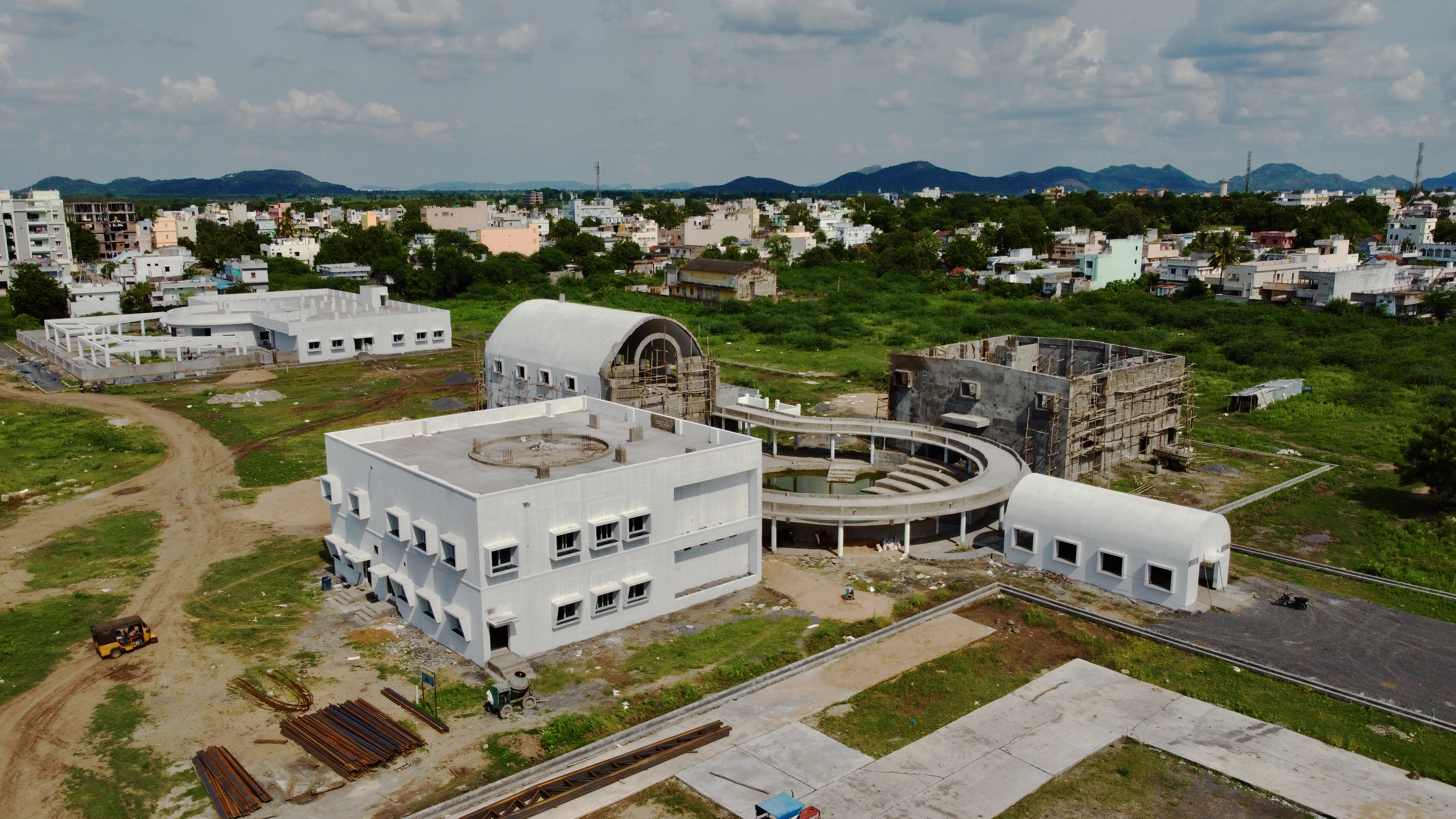
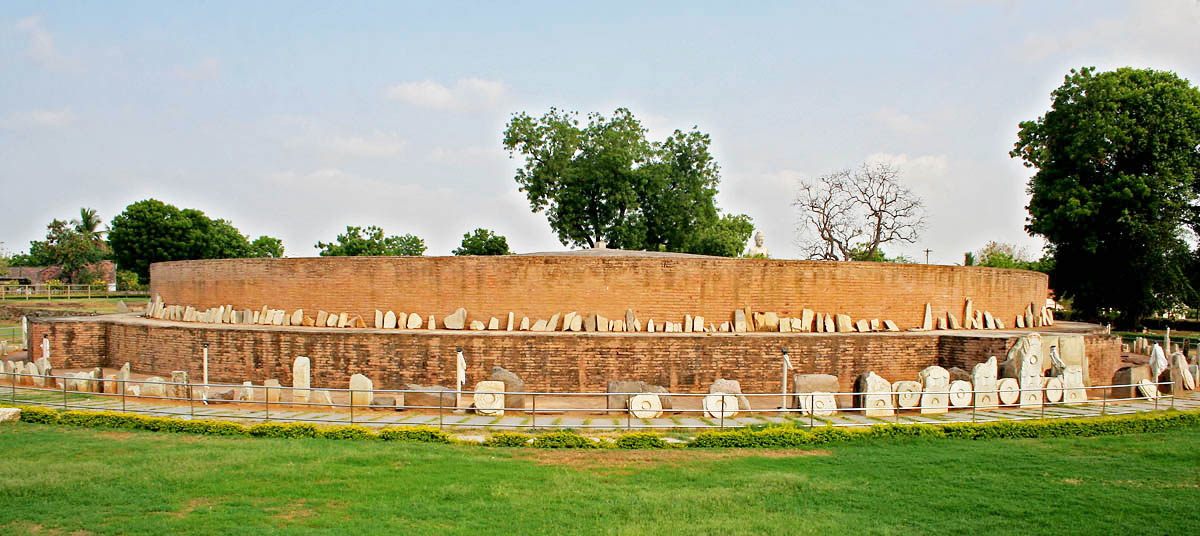
- Ratha Yatra ceremony at Amareswara temple Dhyana Buddha statue Town entrance AP Museum Dhyana Buddha Ghat Dhyana Buddha Museum Amaravati Mahastupa
- Etymology: Abode of the immortals
- Interactive map of Amaravati
- Location in Andhra Pradesh, India Amaravati (Andhra Pradesh)
- Coordinates: 16.573°N 80.358°E
- Country: India
- State: Andhra Pradesh
- District: Palnadu
- Mandal: Amaravati mandal
- Founded: 300 BCE
- Named for: Amararama

Government
  - Type: Panchayati raj
  - Body: Amaravati gram panchayat

Area
  - Total: 1,524 ha (3,770 acres)

Population (2011)
  - Total: 13,400
  - Density: 879/km^{2} (2,280/sq mi)

Languages
  - Official: Telugu
- Time zone: UTC+5:30 (IST)
- PIN: 522020
- Area code: +91–8645
- Vehicle registration: AP

Amaravati is a village located on the banks of the Krishna River in the Palnadu district of Andhra Pradesh, India. It was built by zamindar Vasireddy Venkatadri Nayudu in late 18th century adjacent to the ancient site of the Satavahana capital Dhanyakataka. Amaravati serves as the administrative centre of Amaravati mandal and lies within the Andhra Pradesh Capital Region. Known for its cultural heritage, Amaravati lends its name to the state's newly planned capital, Amaravati, located 35 kilometres to the east in Guntur district. Amaravati is notable for its prominent place in both Hindu and Buddhist traditions.

The place is named after the Amareswara Temple, one of the Pancharama Kshetras, significant Hindu temples dedicated to Lord Siva. It is also home to the ancient Amaravati Stupa, a Buddhist monument from the 2nd century BCE to the 3rd century CE. This stupa, now under the protection of the Archaeological Survey of India, exemplifies the Amaravati School of Art, a style that had a lasting influence on Buddhist art throughout South and Southeast Asia. Designated as one of India's centrally protected Monuments of National Importance, the stupa and its surrounding ruins hold great cultural value.

Amaravati is located near Dhanyakataka (modern Dharanikota), which once served as the capital of the Satavahana dynasty. Key landmarks in Amaravati also include the Amaravati Heritage Centre and Museum, which preserves artifacts from its ancient past, and the Dhyana Buddha statue, a prominent modern sculpture representing the village's Buddhist heritage. The village, with a population of around 13,400 as per the 2011 census, is also recognized under the Heritage City Development and Augmentation Yojana (HRIDAY) scheme for heritage conservation and development.

== Toponymy ==
The name Amaravati translates to "The Abode of Immortals." The place is named after the Amareswara Temple, one of the Pancharama Kshetras, significant Hindu temples dedicated to Lord Siva.

== History ==
=== Early history ===
Amaravati is said to have a continuous history spanning at least 2,300 years. According to the tradition of the Kalachakra Tantra, Gautama Buddha is believed to have visited the Andhaka region (modern-day Dhanyakataka) to deliver sermons. During the rule of Emperor Ashoka, the region remained on the periphery of the Maurya Empire, but with the emergence of the Satavahana dynasty around 225 BCE, Amaravathi became their eastern capital, with Pratisthana (modern Paithan) serving as their western capital.

The Amaravati Stupa, an ancient Buddhist monument, is one of the most prominent sites in South India. Discovered by a local zamindar in the late 18th century, it has undergone multiple excavations over the centuries. The stupa's origins likely date to the post-Mauryan period (c. 200–100 BCE), with evidence of later renovations. Early sculptures from the site exhibit signs of repurposing, indicating that the stupa's architectural components were significantly modified over time.

During the Satavahana period, Amaravati and Sannati (in Gulbarga District, Karnataka) developed a distinct artistic style known as the Amaravati School of Art, comparable to the Mathura and Gandhara schools in Central and Northwestern India. Buddhist sculptures, including images of Vajrasana, Muchulinda Naga, and key episodes from Buddha's life, as well as memorial stones, were crafted in this style, characterized by intricate detailing and unique thematic elements. These sculptures were exported to Sri Lanka, where they contributed to the spread of Buddhism. Amaravati's monasteries and educational institutions attracted scholars from across India, East Asia, and Southeast Asia. The Ikshvaku dynasty, which ruled the region in the 3rd to 4th centuries CE, continued to support these Buddhist institutions even after the decline of the Satavahanas. The Skanda Purana provides accounts of Amaravati's religious and cultural significance, particularly focusing on the Shiva temple.

=== Medieval history ===
The Mahachaitya at Amaravati, locally known as Dipaladinne ("Hill of Lamps"), was first recognized for its historical significance by Colonel Colin Mackenzie in 1797. The mound, located on the southern bank of the Krishna River, was being excavated on the orders of zamindar Vasireddy Venkatadri Nayudu, who had recently moved his seat of power from Chintapalli to Amaravati. As part of establishing the new township, Venkatadri Nayudu invited settlers from surrounding areas and provided support for building activities. Materials from Dipaladinne, including large bricks and sculptured marble slabs, were repurposed for construction, such as for the Sivaganga tank. Despite initial hopes of uncovering treasures, the zamindar's excavation yielded no valuables, and some sculpted slabs were defaced before being used in local mosques to prevent their association with idolatry.

News of these findings reached Mackenzie, who briefly visited and assessed the site's archaeological potential. In 1818, he returned with a team to create detailed drawings and recover some sculptured pieces. Later, Walter Elliot (1803–1887) further excavated the Amaravati Stupa, sending a significant portion of artifacts, known as the "Elliot Marbles," to the British Museum.

=== The Great Stūpa or Mahācaitya ===
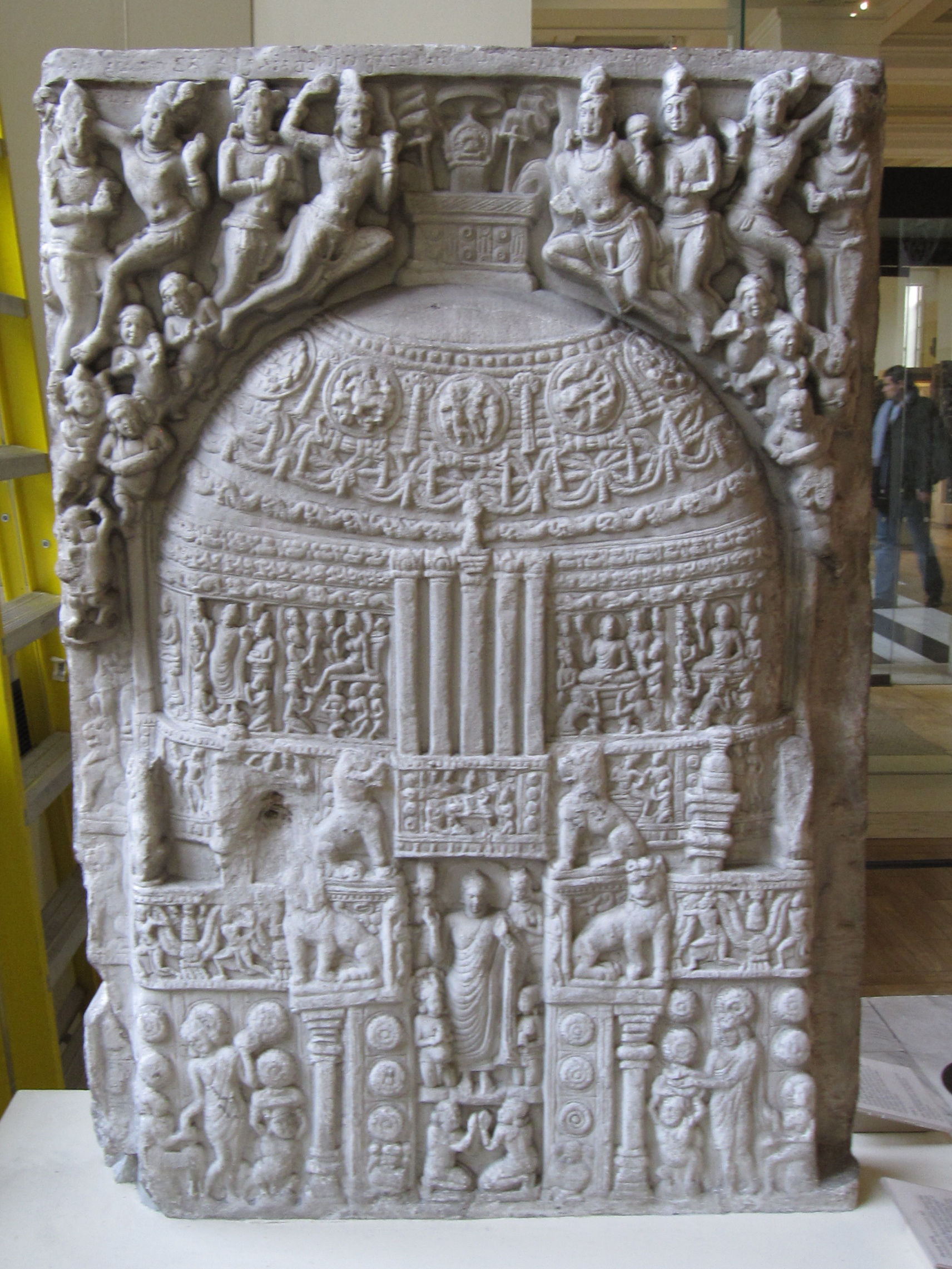
Limestone drum slab, 3rd century CE, of the Great Stupa at Amaravati.

The Mahachaitya, or Amaravati Stupa, is the most prominent historic monument in Amaravati. Built in phases between the 3rd century BCE and around 250 CE, it was later expanded with new sculptures by the Satavahanas around 50 CE. Protected by the Archaeological Survey of India, the site includes the stupa ruins and an adjacent museum housing artifacts from the site. In 2006, the Dalai Lamavisited Amaravati, performing Kalachakra Mahasamalanam during the Kalachakra festival.

The Amaravati Stupa is celebrated for its influence on ancient Indian art, forming one of three major schools along with Mathura and Gandhara. Its art style, known as the Amaravati or Andhra style, significantly influenced art in South India, Sri Lanka, and Southeast Asia. Today, notable sculptures from the stupa are held in museums, including the British Museum in London and the Government Museum in Chennai, reflecting the stupa's historic prominence as a major monument in Buddhist Asia.

== Geography ==
Amaravati is situated at 16.579444°N 80.311111°E. It is spread over an area of 1,524 ha (3,770 acres; 15.24 km^{2}).

== Demographics ==
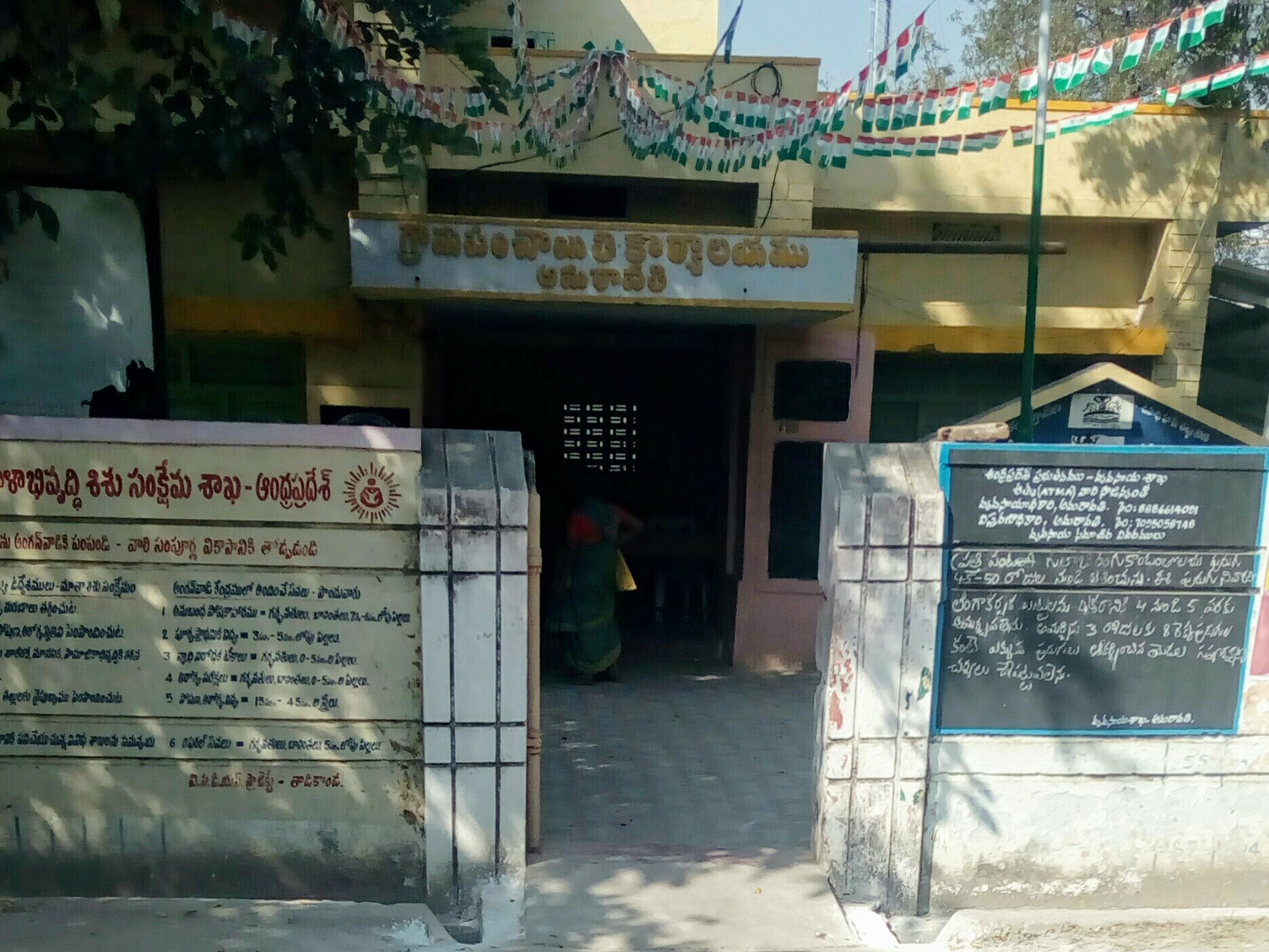
Gram panchayat office in Amaravathi

As of 2011 Census of India, the town had a population of 13,400 with 3,316 households. The total population constitute, 6,432 males and 6,958 females—a sex ratio of 1,082 females per 1,000 males. 1,321 children are in the age group of 0–6 years, of which 647 are boys and 674 are girls—a ratio of 1,042 per 1,000. The average literacy rate stands at 71.3% with 8,617 literates, higher than the state average of 67.4%.

== Government and politics ==
Amaravati gram panchayat is the local self-government of the village. It is divided into wards and each ward is represented by a ward member. The village as a part of Amaravathi mandal, which is part of the Pedakurapadu assembly constituency. The present MLA representing the constituency is Bhashyam Praveen from TDP.

== Culture ==
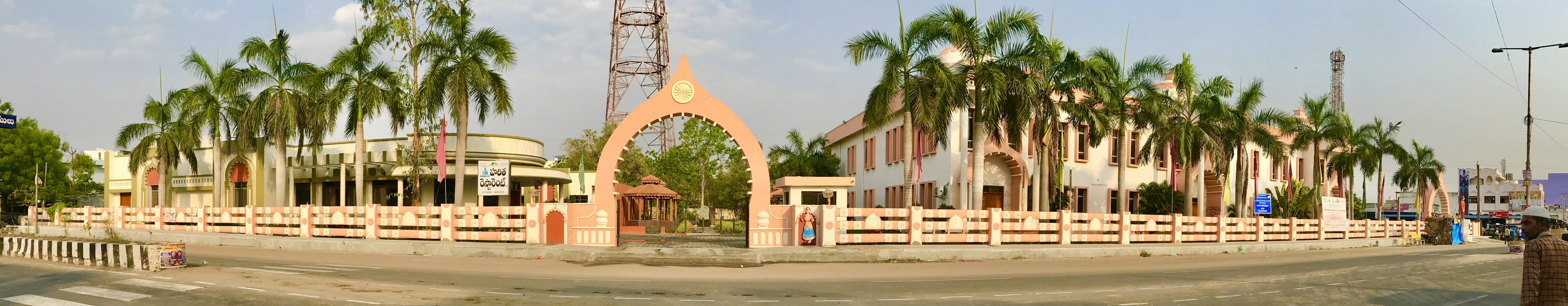
Panorama of Amaravathi Cultural Heritage Museum

The town is a centre of pilgrimage for both Hindus and Buddhists. The inscriptions on the walls of the Amareswara temple depict the reign of Vasireddy Venkatadri Nayudu who ruled before the advent of British rule. He was well known for his benevolence, munificence and for the construction of a large number of temples and education centres in the Krishna River delta. It also hosts a 125-foot tall statue of the Buddha, known as the Dhyana Buddha. The ancient structures and replicas can be found at Kalachakra museum, which was renamed the Amaravathi Heritage Centre and Museum. The ancient Buddhist stupa and other ruins make up one of the centrally protected Monuments of National Importance. The main Hindu festivals celebrated are Mahasivaratri and the Navaratri. The 30th Kalachakra festival, a popular Buddhist ritual, was held at Amaravathi in the first week of January 2006. It is one of the oldest tourist places for Buddhists.

== Transport ==
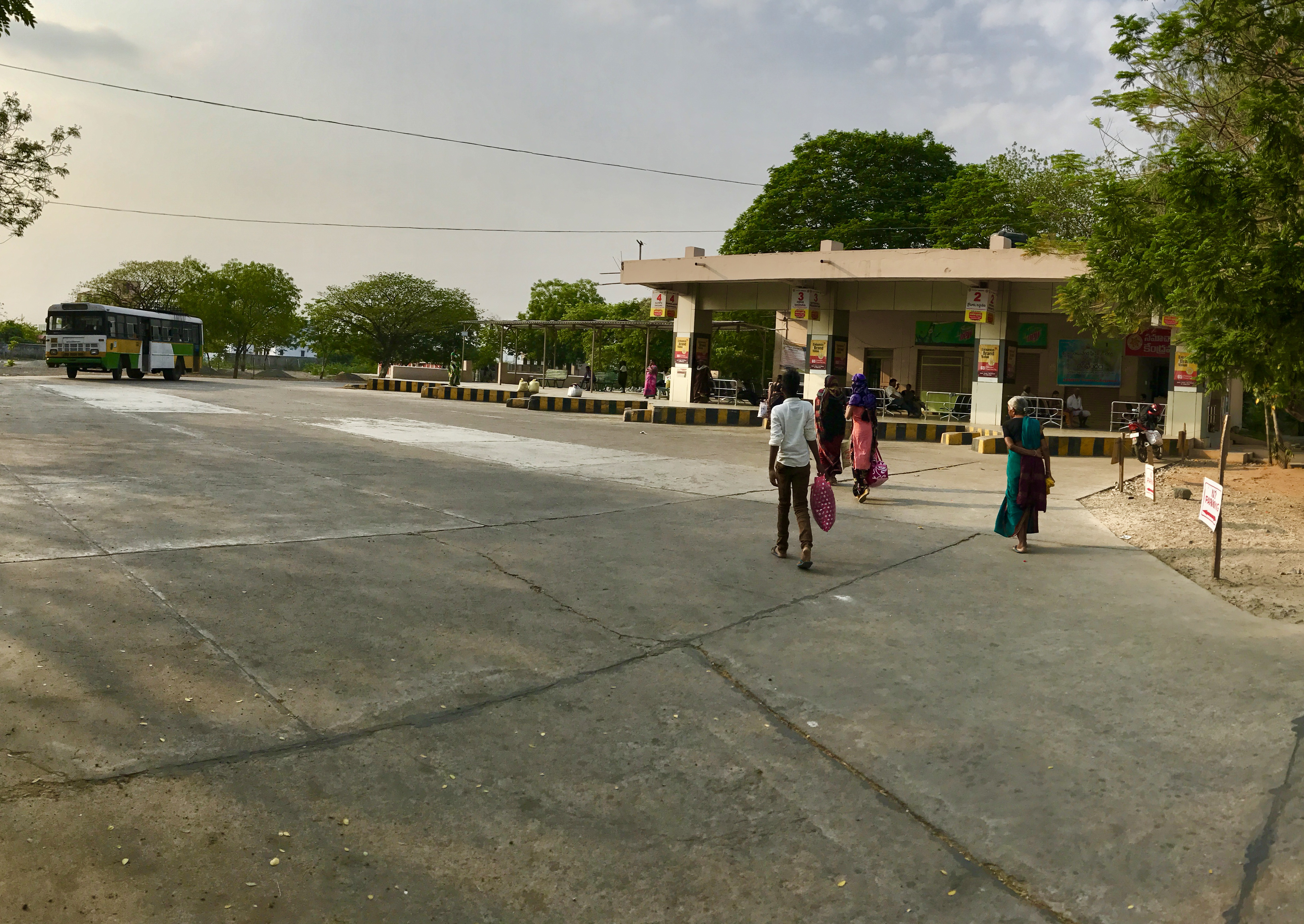
Amaravati bus station

The only means of connectivity for the village is by road. The Vijayawada–Amaravati Road connects the village with cities of Vijayawada, Tenali, Guntur, and with the Andhra Pradesh Capital Region areas of Undavalli, Penumaka, Rayapudi. The Guntur–Amaravathi Road connects it with the district headquarters, Guntur. It is also linked by road to Sattenapalle, Mangalagiri and Krosuru. APSRTC operates buses from major bus stations like NTR bus station in Guntur, Pandit Nehru bus station in Vijayawada and the Tenali bus station. The village has no rail connectivity.

A waterway categorised as class–III is planned from Pulichintala to Prakasam Barrage, which connects the nearby villages of Harishchandrapuram and Vykuntapuram.

== Education ==
As per the school information report for the academic year 2018–19, the village has a total of 17 schools. These schools include 4 MPP, one KGBV and 12 private schools.

== See also ==
- List of villages in Palnadu district

== Bibliography ==
- Ramaswami, N. S. (1971). Indian Monuments. Abhinav Publications. ISBN 978-0-89684-091-1.
