= Revendrapadu =

- Village
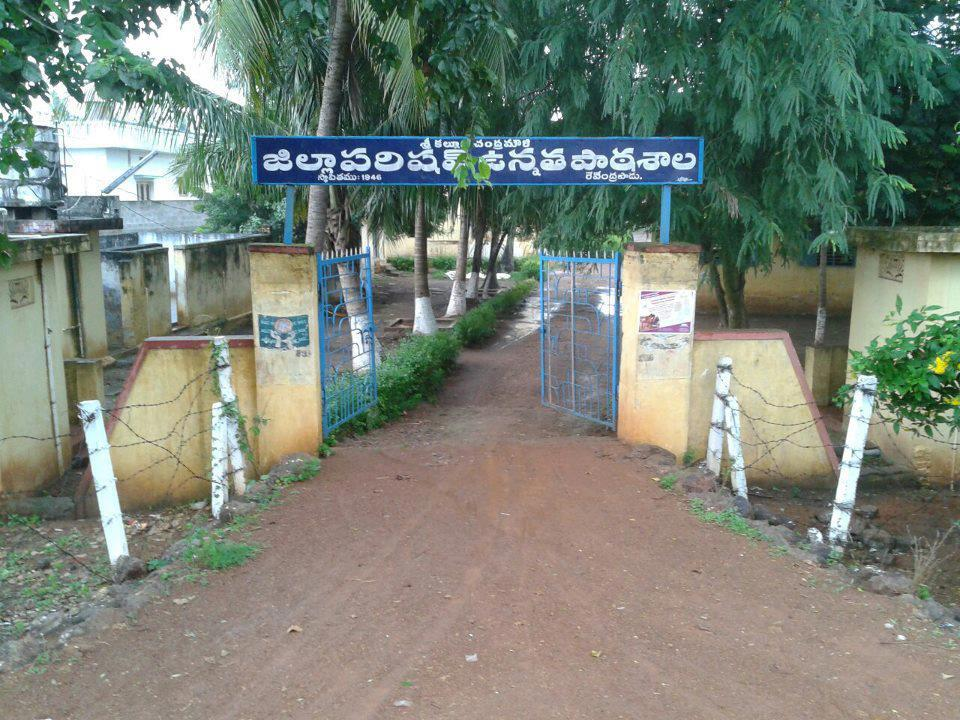
- Entrance of Z P High School of Revendrapadu
- Interactive map of Revendrapadu
- Location within Andhra Pradesh
- Coordinates: 16°24′22.80″N 80°37′20.3″E
- Country: India
- State: Andhra Pradesh
- District: Guntur

Languages
  - Official: Telugu
- Time zone: UTC+5:30 (IST)
- PIN: 522302
- Telephone code: 8645
- Nearest city: Vijayawada
- Lok Sabha: Guntur
- Vidhan Sabha: Mangalagiri

Revendrapadu is a village in Guntur district of Andhra Pradesh, India. It is located in Duggirala mandal.

== Geography ==
Revendrapadu is located at 16°24'22.8" N 80°.37'20.3" E, and lies in Southern India. It borders the Pedavadlapudi to the west, Mellempudi on the north, Nutakki on east and Srungarapuram on south.

== Politics ==
Revendrapadu Sarpanch is Smt . It comes under Mangalagiri assembly constituency and Guntur parliamentary constituency. Currently MLA of Mangalagiri is Nara Lokesh (TDP) and MP of Guntur is Chandra Sekhar Pemmasani (TDP).

== Education ==
The primary and secondary school education is imparted by government, aided and private schools, under the School Education Department of the state. There are no student enrollment in any school of the village.

== See also ==
- Villages in Duggirala mandal
