= Penumuli =

- Village
- Interactive map of Penumuli
- Location in Andhra Pradesh, India
- Coordinates: 16°20′07″N 80°36′11″E
- Country: India
- State: Andhra Pradesh
- District: Guntur
- Mandal: Duggirala

Government
  - Type: Panchayati raj
  - Body: Penumuli gram panchayat

Area
  - Total: 1,410 ha (3,500 acres)

Population (2011)
  - Total: 3,199
  - Density: 227/km^{2} (588/sq mi)

Languages
  - Official: Telugu
- Time zone: UTC+5:30 (IST)
- PIN: 522330
- Area code: +91–8644
- Vehicle registration: AP

Penumuli is a village in Guntur district of the Indian state of Andhra Pradesh. It is the mandal headquarters of Duggirala mandal in Tenali revenue division. Present sarpanch of penumuli was elected in the year of 2021 February 10 was Koritala Padmavathi .

== Geography ==
Penumuli is situated to the north of the mandal headquarters, Duggirala, at 16.3349°N 80.6039°E. It is spread over an area of 1,410 ha (3,500 acres).

== Government and politics ==
Penumuli gram panchayat is the local self-government of the village. It is divided into 12 wards and each ward is represented by a ward member. The village forms a part of Andhra Pradesh Capital Region and is under the jurisdiction of APCRDA.

== Transport ==
Namburu–Penumuli road connects the village with Namburu. While, Duggirala railway station provides rail connectivity, situated near the village.

== Education ==
As per the school information report for the academic year 2018–19, the village has a total of 5 Zilla Parishad/Mandal Parishad schools.

== See also ==
- List of villages in Guntur district
