= Chiluvuru =

- Village
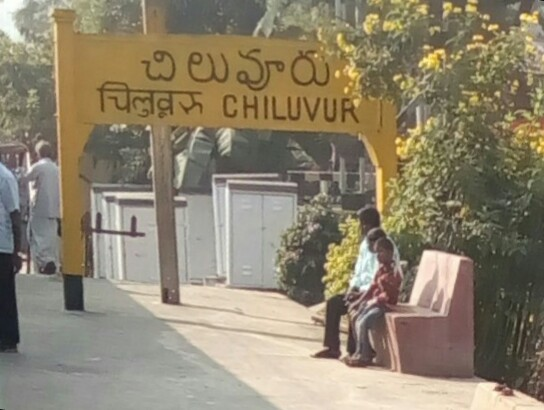
- Chiluvuru railway signboard
- Interactive map of Chiluvuru
- Location in Andhra Pradesh, India
- Coordinates: 16.3785°N 80.6146°E
- Country: India
- State: Andhra Pradesh
- District: Guntur
- Mandal: Duggirala

Government
  - Type: Panchayati raj
  - Body: Chiluvuru gram panchayat

Area
  - Total: 805 ha (1,990 acres)

Population (2011)
  - Total: 7,952
  - Density: 988/km^{2} (2,560/sq mi)

Languages
  - Official: Telugu
- Time zone: UTC+5:30 (IST)
- PIN: 522330
- Area code: +91–8644
- Vehicle registration: AP

Chiluvuru) is a village in Guntur district of the Indian state of Andhra Pradesh. It is located in Duggirala mandal of Tenali revenue division.

== Geography ==
Chiluvuru is situated to the northwest of the mandal headquarters, Duggirala, at 16.3785°N 80.6146°E. It is spread over an area of 805 ha (1,990 acres).

== Demographics ==
As of 2011 census, Chiluvuru had a population of 7,952. The total population constitute, 3,948 males and 4,004 females —a sex ratio of 1014 females per 1000 males. 774 children are in the age group of 0–6 years, of which 393 are boys and 381 are girls —a ratio of 970 per 1000. The average literacy rate stands at 70.42% with 5,055 literates, significantly higher than the state average of 67.41%.

== Government and politics ==
Chiluvuru gram panchayat is the local self-government of the village. It is divided into wards and each ward is represented by a ward member. The village forms a part of Andhra Pradesh Capital Region and is under the jurisdiction of APCRDA.

Chilvuru panchayat in Duggirala mandal is a part of Mangalagiri assembly constituency for Andhra Pradesh Legislative Assembly. It falls under Guntur (Lok Sabha constituency), one of the 25 Lok Sabha constituencies of Andhra Pradesh.

== Transport ==
Chiluvur railway station is located on the mutual line of Howrah-Chennai and New Delhi-Chennai lines, administered under Vijayawada railway division of South Central Railway zone. Locally you can reach Chiluvuru from Vijayawada and Guntur via Mangalgiri from where you get frequent three-wheelers either hire or sharing/

== Education ==
As per the school information report for the academic year 2018–19, the village has a total of 7 schools. These schools include 4 private, 3 MPP schools.

== See also ==
- List of villages in Guntur district
