= Mangalagiri sarees and fabrics =

- Geographical indication
- Type: Handicraft
- Area: Mangalagiri, Guntur district, Andhra Pradesh
- Country: India
- Material: Fabric: Dye

Mangalagiri sarees and fabrics are produced by performing handicraft weaving in Mangalagiri, a town in Guntur district of the Indian state of Andhra Pradesh. It was registered as one of the handicrafts in the geographical indication from Andhra Pradesh by Geographical Indications of Goods (Registration and Protection) Act, 1999.

== History ==
The occupation of weaving is as old as 400 years as per some inscriptions found at this region. There was a migratory period for the weavers during the rule of Qutub Shahi due to increase in taxes.

== Production ==
The Mangalagiri fabric is produced by weaving with the help of pitlooms from combed yarn by warp and woof interlacing. The fabric then undergoes the process of dyeing. The Nizam design is another characteristic of the fabric. The production of the Mangalagiri sari includes different stages which includes:

- Raw materials – pure cotton yarn, silver and gold zaris, synthetic and natural dyes and some chemicals.
- Cotton purification – This process involves boiling of hank cotton to remove certain impurities, soaked overnight, rinsed and made suitable for dyeing process.
- Dyeing – it involves bleaching technique for white saris and for colored ones, Vat dyes are used.
- Removal of excess dye – dyed or bleached yarn undergoes soaking in boiling water with some techniques to cut out excess dyeing.
- Drying – after the above process, the yarn is dried and also adds light sensitive colors in shades

Pre-loom process

- Winding of hank yarn into warp and weft – charka, shift bamboo and bobbin are used to form warp. While, the weft is made with help of a pirn.
- Street sizing – the warp extension, spraying of rice conjee ensures suitable weaving followed by drying.
- Weaving process – it involves Warp and Weft method of weaving and sometimes replaced by Jacquard weaving. Usage of only pitlooms for weaving, designing and cutting per the goods demand undertakes
- Cutting & folding – woven cloth undergoes cutting per the goods demand
- Inspection of sarees – inspection by the master weaver to rectify flaws
- Marketing – the period of 1985 bought revolution with new market for dress materials than the saris

== Sarees ==
Mangalagiri saris are unique variety, woven from cotton and has the most characteristic features such like zari on the border and no woven designs on the body. As the town is also the abode of Narasimha Temple, the saris are also used by the devotees for devotional purposes.

== See also ==
- List of Geographical Indications in India
