= Tummapudi =

- Village
- Interactive map of Tummapudi
- Location in Andhra Pradesh, India
- Coordinates: 16.3780°N 80.6231°E
- Country: India
- State: Andhra Pradesh
- District: Guntur
- Mandal: Duggirala

Government
  - Type: Panchayati raj
  - Body: Tummapudi gram panchayat

Area
  - Total: 569 ha (1,410 acres)

Population (2011)
  - Total: 6,738
  - Density: 1,180/km^{2} (3,070/sq mi)

Languages
  - Official: Telugu
- Time zone: UTC+5:30 (IST)
- PIN: 522259
- Area code: +91–8644
- Vehicle registration: AP

Tummapudi is a village in Guntur district of the Indian state of Andhra Pradesh. It is located in Duggirala mandal of Tenali revenue division.

== Geography ==
Tummapudi is situated to the north of the mandal headquarters, Duggirala, at 16.3780°N 80.6231°E. It is spread over an area of 569 ha (1,410 acres).

== Government and politics ==
Tummapudi gram panchayat is the local self-government of the village. It is divided into wards and each ward is represented by a ward member. The village forms a part of Andhra Pradesh Capital Region and is under the jurisdiction of APCRDA.

== Education ==
As per the school information report for the academic year 2018–19, the village has a total of 7 schools. These schools include 1 private and 6 Zilla Parishad/Mandal Parishad schools.

== See also ==
- List of villages in Guntur district
