= Krishnayapalem =

Neighbourhood in Amaravati, Andhra Pradesh, India

- Neighbourhood
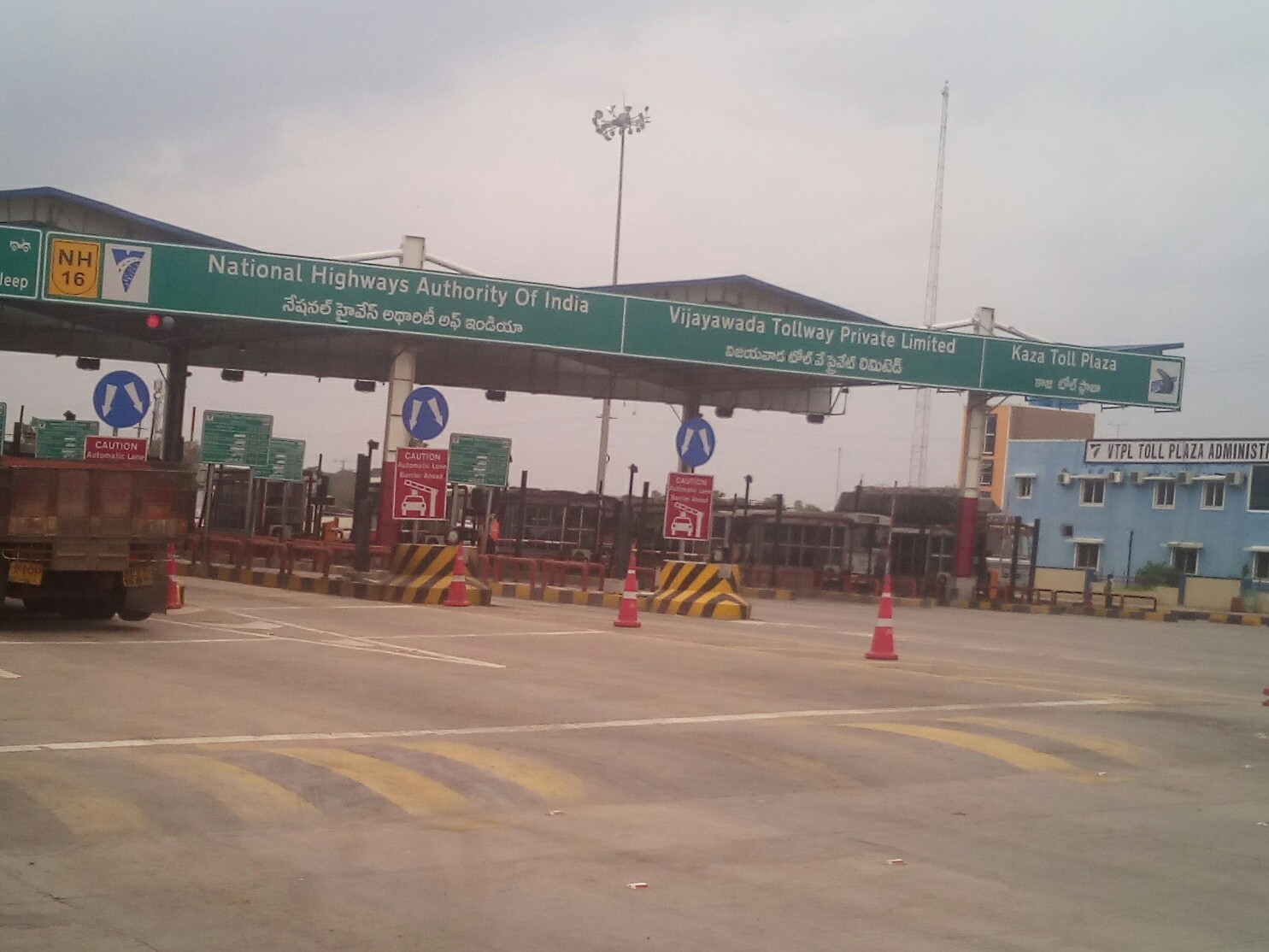
- Kaza toll plaza

- Location in Andhra Pradesh, India
- Coordinates: 16.29217°N 80.33243°E
- Country: India
- State: Andhra Pradesh
- District: Guntur
- Mandal: Mangalagiri

Government
  - Type: Panchayati raj
  - Body: Krishnayapalem gram panchayat

Area
  - Total: 634 ha (1,570 acres)

Population (2011)
  - Total: 1,560
  - Density: 246/km^{2} (637/sq mi)

Languages
  - Official: Telugu
- Time zone: UTC+5:30 (IST)
- PIN: 522503
- Area code: +91–8645
- Vehicle registration: AP

Krishnayapalem is a neighbourhood in Amaravati, Andhra Pradesh, India. It is a part of Urban Notified Area of Amaravati. It is a denotification as gram panchayat in Mangalagiri mandal of Guntur district.

== Geography ==
Krishnayapalem is situated to the southwest of the mandal headquarters, Mangalagiri, at 16.29217°N 80.33243°E. It is spread over an area of 634 ha (1,570 acres).

== Demographics ==
As of 2011 Census of India, the town had a population of 1,560, of which males are 724, females are 836 and the population under 6 years of age are 146. The average literacy rate stands at 69.52 percent.

== Government and politics ==
Krishnayapalem gram panchayat is the local self-government of the village. It is divided into wards and each ward is represented by a ward member. In 2013, the then sarpanch of the gram panchayat was awarded Nirmala Grama Puraskaram . The ruling sarpanch of this village is Ch Naga Srinivas. The village forms a part of Andhra Pradesh Capital Region and is under the jurisdiction of APCRDA.

== Education ==
As per the school information report for the academic year 2018–19, the village has a total of 2 Zilla Parishad/MPP schools.

== Transport ==
Krishnayapalem is located on Vijayawada – Amaravati and Amaravati – Thulluru – Mangalagiri route. APSRTC run buses offers transport services in the route.

== See also ==
- List of villages in Guntur district
