= Lakshmi Narasimha Temple, Mangalagiri =

Vaishnavite temple

Lakshmi Narasimha Temple
- 6th Nava Narasimha Temple
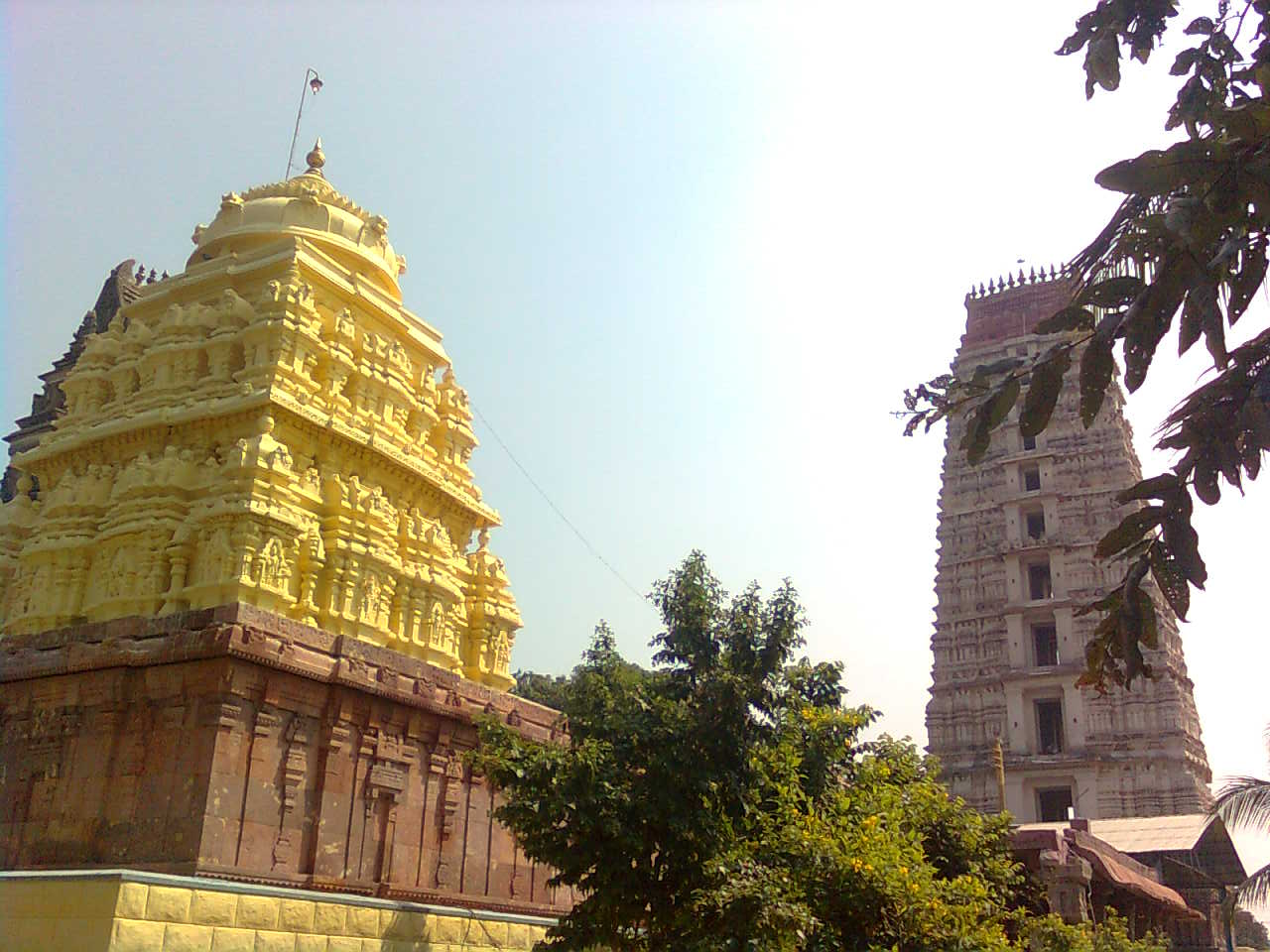
- Lakshmi Narasimha Temple

Religion
- Affiliation: Hinduism
- District: Guntur
- Deity: Lakshmi Narasimha

Location
- Location: Mangalagiri, Vijayawada
- State: Andhra Pradesh
- Country: India
- Interactive map of Lakshmi Narasimha Temple
- Coordinates: 16.4370352°N 80.5701012°E

Architecture
- Type: Dravidian architecture
- Temple: 3
- Inscriptions: Telugu and Sanskrit

Website
- guntur.nic.in/mangalagiri_temple.html

Lakshmi Narasimha Temple is a Vaishnavite temple considered one of the eight sacred places of Vishnu in India. It is also known for being one of the eight mahakshetras Narasimha in India. It is at the foot of the Auspicious Hill in Mangalagiri which is part of the Vijayawada in Guntur district of Andhra Pradesh, India. It is one of the temples in the series of three temples located on and at the bottom of the hill, the other two being Panakala Narasimha Temple on the hill and Gandalaya Narasimha Temple at the top of the hill. It has one of the highest gopurams in South India and is the only one of its type in that part of India. It is 153 feet (47 m) in height and 49 feet (15 m) wide and has eleven storeys.

== History ==
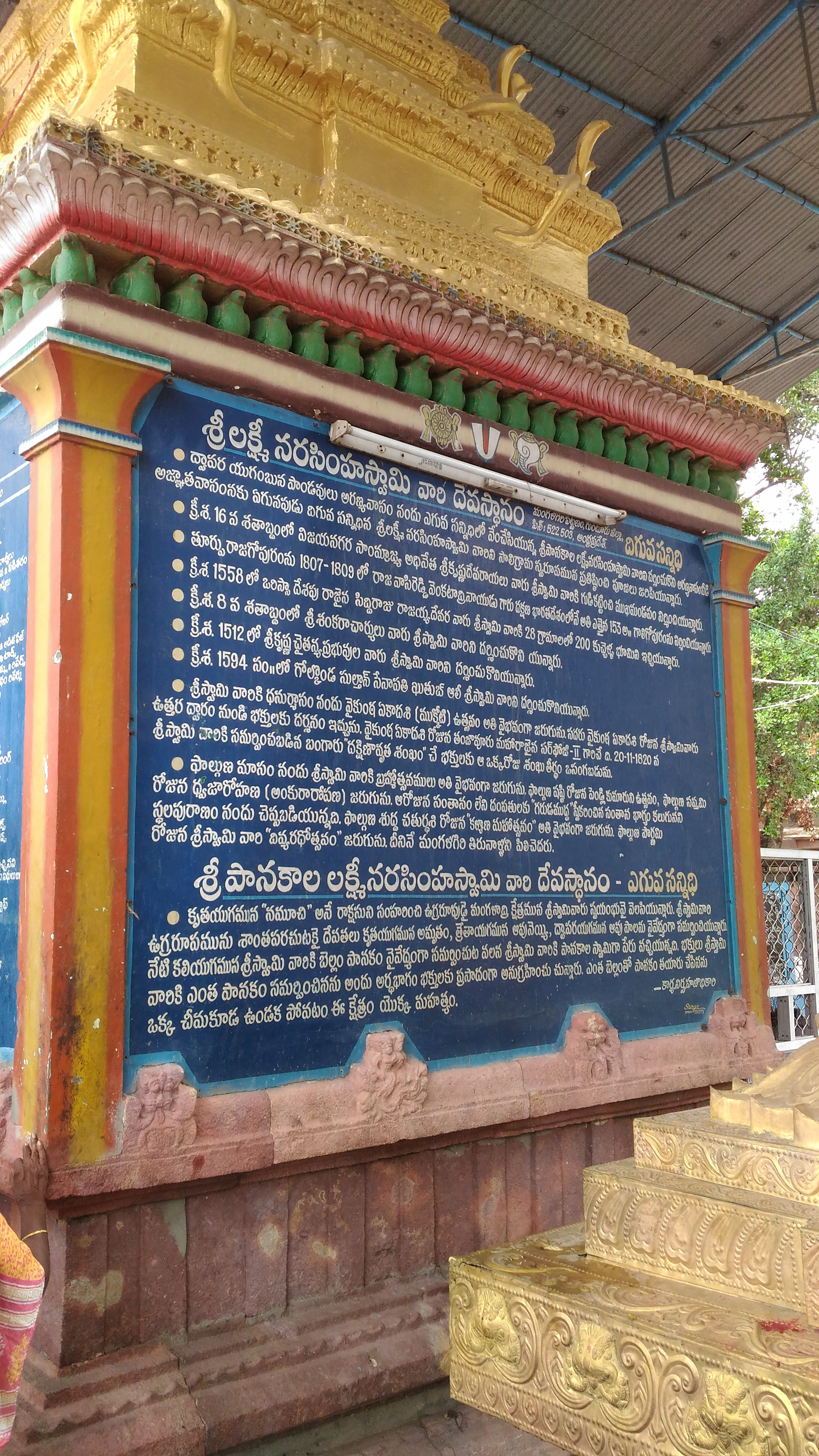
Sri Lakshmi Narasimha Swamy Temple – Diguva Sannidhi

The Lakshmi Narasimha Temple is popularly believed to have been discovered by Yudhishthira, the eldest Pandava brother. The temple's history is said to be recorded in the Brahma Vaivarta Purana, one of the old Hindu religious scriptures. This temple was patronized by the Vijayanagara rulers. There is an inscription from the time of Krishnadevaraya, who had visited the temple, at the temple site. The temple's tall eleven story gali gopuram was built by Rajah Vasireddy Venkatadri Nayudu, the Rajah of Amaravathi and a devotee of Narasimha.
