= Mangalagiri mandal =

- Mandal
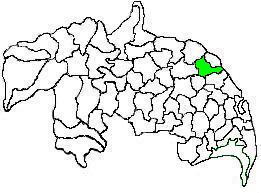
- Mandal map of Guntur district showing Mangalagiri mandal (in green)
- Interactive map of Mangalagiri mandal
- Location in Andhra Pradesh, India
- Coordinates: 16.2877°N 80.7519°E
- Country: India
- State: Andhra Pradesh
- District: Guntur
- Headquarters: Mangalagiri

Government
  - Body: Mandal Parishad
  - Tehsildar: CH.Krishnamurthy

Area
  - Total: 141.96 km^{2} (54.81 sq mi)

Population (2011)
  - Total: 160,303
  - Density: 1,129.2/km^{2} (2,924.6/sq mi)

Languages
  - Official: Telugu
- Time zone: UTC+5:30 (IST)

Mangalagiri mandal is one of the 18 mandals in Guntur district of the Indian state of Andhra Pradesh. It is under the administration of Tenali revenue division and the headquarters are located at Mangalagiri town part of Mangalagiri Tadepalli Municipal Corporation. The mandal is bounded by Thullur, Tadepalle, Tadikonda, Pedakakani and Duggirala mandals and a portion of the mandal lies on the banks of Krishna River.

== History ==
Until February 1970, Guntur district had only eight taluks. Mangalagiri taluk was formed on 1 November 1977 by re-organising the then existing eight taluks into eleven taluks. On 25 May 1985, mandals were recognised, replacing taluks and firkas.

== Demographics ==
As of 2011 census, the mandal had a population of 160,303. The total population constitute, 80,363 males and 79,940 females —a sex ratio of 995 females per 1000 males. 15,833 children are in the age group of 0–6 years, of which 7,990 are boys and 7,843 are girls. The average literacy rate stands at 72.32% with 104,479 literates.

== Governance ==
=== Administration ===
The four villages namely, Krishnayapalem, Nidamarru, Kuragallu (Nerukonda hamlets), Nowluru (Yerrabalem & Bethapudi hamlets) of the mandal are a part of Andhra Pradesh capital city and the mandal is a part of Andhra Pradesh Capital Region, under the jurisdiction of APCRDA. The mandal is controlled by a tahsildar and the present tahsildar is CH.Krishnamurthy.

As of 2011 census, the mandal has twelve revenue villages, fourteen gram panchayats, one town, two out growths and nine villages. Mangalagiri (M) is the only town and Nowlur (OG), Atmakur (OG) are the out growths to Mangalagiri (M).

The settlements in the mandal are listed below:

1. Atmakur
2. Chinakakani
3. Chinavadlapudi
4. Yerrabalem
5. Kaza
6. Krishnayapalem
7. Kuragallu
8. Mangalagiri Tadepalli Municipal Corporation (Corp)
9. Nidamarru
10. Nowlur (OG)
11. Nutakki
12. Pedavadlapudi
13. Ramachandrapuram

Note: M-Municipality, (Corp)-Municipal Corporation, OG-Out Growth

=== Politics ===
Mangalagiri mandal is one of the 3 mandals under Mangalagiri (Assembly constituency), which in turn represents Guntur (Lok Sabha constituency) of Andhra Pradesh.

== Education ==
The mandal plays a major role in education for the rural students of the nearby villages. The primary and secondary school education is imparted by government, aided and private schools, under the School Education Department of the state. As per the school information report for the academic year 2015–16, the mandal has more than 23,920 students enrolled in over 114 schools.

== See also ==
- List of mandals in Andhra Pradesh
- Villages in Mangalagiri mandal
