= Kantamraju Konduru =

- Village
- Interactive map of Kantamraju Konduru
- Location in Andhra Pradesh, India
- Coordinates: 16.348804°N 80.601467°E
- Country: India
- State: Andhra Pradesh
- District: Guntur
- Mandal: Duggirala

Government
  - Type: Panchayati raj
  - Body: Kantamraju Konduru gram panchayat

Area
  - Total: 1,004 ha (2,480 acres)

Population (2011)
  - Total: 3,218
  - Density: 320.5/km^{2} (830.1/sq mi)

Languages
  - Official: Telugu
- Time zone: UTC+5:30 (IST)
- PIN: 522330
- Area code: +91–8644
- Vehicle registration: AP

Kantamraju Kounduru is a village in Guntur district of the Indian state of Andhra Pradesh. It is located in Duggirala mandal of Tenali revenue division. It falls under the Andhra Pradesh Capital Region. The village is known for its historical association with the Indian independence movement, particularly through the establishment of Vinayashram, a Gandhian institution founded in 1933. Mahatma Gandhi visited the ashram during its early years, and it later became a center for rural development and training freedom fighter. The village also hosts educational institutions and is home to a Krishi Vigyan Kendra (KVK) named after N. G. Ranga.

== History ==
Vinayashram was established on 23 December 1933 in Kantamraju Kounduru by Tummala Basavaiah and Smt. Durgamba, the followers of Mahatma Gandhi. It was set up was in response to Gandhi's call for rural development and self-reliance. Mahatma Gandhi visited the ashram, and the site where he stayed is now known as Gandhi Kuteer. The ashram was later developed by Congress leader and freedom fighter Gollapudi Sita Ram Sastri into a training center for freedom activists.

== Geography ==
Penumuli is situated to the northwest of the mandal headquarters tenali town in guntur district, Duggirala, at 16.348804°N 80.601467°E. It is spread over an area of 1,004 ha (2,480 acres).

== Governance ==
Kantamraju Konduru gram panchayat is the local self-government of the village. It is divided into wards and each ward is represented by a ward member. The village forms a part of Andhra Pradesh Capital Region and is under the jurisdiction of APCRDA.

== Culture ==
Vinayashram has long served as a center for Gandhian ideals and rural reconstruction. It has supported activities such as village sanitation, adult education, khadi and village industries, and daily community meals (nitya annadanam). The ashram is also known for translating the Vedas into Telugu for wider public access and for operating an Ayurvedic hospital that provides free treatment and lodging to underprivileged patients. Eminent leaders including Vinoba Bhave, Rajendra Prasad, Jayaprakash Narayan, Tanguturi Prakasam Pantulu, and N.G. Ranga have visited the site. A Bodhi tree planted by Gandhi in 1933 and other commemorative plantings remain part of the ashram’s legacy. Since 1992, the Krishi Vigyan Kendra (KVK) named after Prof. N. G. Ranga also functions from the site.

== Education ==
As per the school information report for the academic year 2018–19, the village has a total of 5 schools. These schools include 2 private, 3 MPP schools.

== See also ==
- List of villages in Guntur district
