= Chinakakani =

- Village
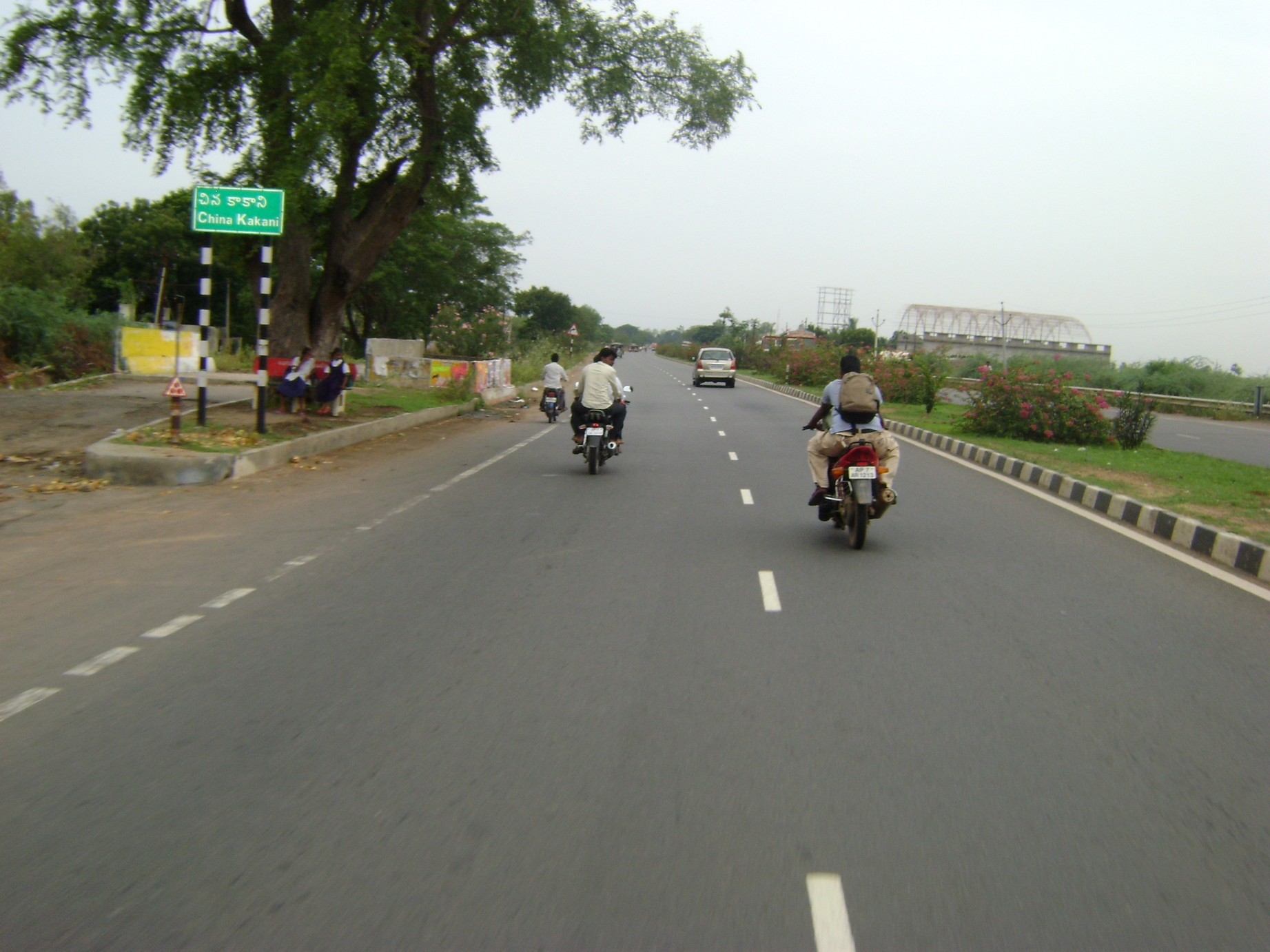
- Chinakakani sign board on NH–16, Guntur district
- Interactive map of Chinakakani
- Location in Andhra Pradesh, India
- Coordinates: 16.404570°N 80.557907°E
- Country: India
- State: Andhra Pradesh
- District: Guntur
- Mandal: Mangalagiri

Government
  - Type: Panchayati raj
  - Body: Chinakakani gram panchayat

Area
  - Total: 1,083 ha (2,680 acres)

Population (2011)
  - Total: 7,040
  - Density: 650/km^{2} (1,680/sq mi)

Languages
  - Official: Telugu
- Time zone: UTC+5:30 (IST)
- PIN: 522615
- Area code: +91–863
- Vehicle registration: AP

Chinakakani is a village in Guntur district of the Indian state of Andhra Pradesh. It is located in Mangalagiri mandal part of Mangalagiri Tadepalle Municipal Corporation part of Guntur revenue division.

== Geography ==
Chinakakani is situated to the south of the mandal headquarters, Mangalagiri, at 16.404570°N 80.557907°E. It is spread over an area of 1,083 ha (2,680 acres).

== Demographics ==
As of 2011 census, Chinakakani had a population of 7,040. The total population constitutes 3,561 males and 3,479 females —a sex ratio of 977 females per 1000 males. 748 children are in the age group of 0–6 years, of which 389 are boys and 359 are girls —a ratio of 923 per 1000. The average literacy rate stands at 69.68% with 4,384 literates.

== Governance ==
Chinakakani gram panchayat is the local self-government of the village. It is divided into wards and each ward is represented by a ward member. The village forms a part of Andhra Pradesh Capital Region and is under the jurisdiction of APCRDA.

== Education ==
As per the school information report for the academic year 2018–19, the village has a total of 5 schools. These include 3 Zilla Parishad/MPP and 2 private schools.

== Transport ==
The National Highway 16 passes through the village, which connects Chennai and Kolkata. APS RTC operates bus services from Vijayawada, Guntur and Mangalagiri to this village.

== See also ==
- List of villages in Guntur district
