= Pedavadlapudi railway station =

Railway station in Andhra Pradesh, India

Pedavadlapudi
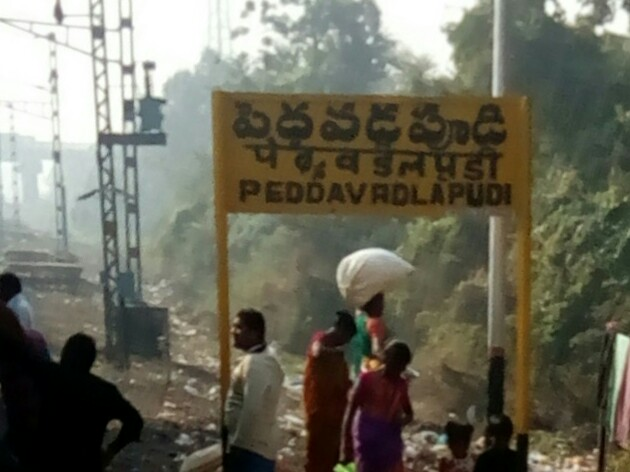
- Peddavadlapudi railway signboard

General information
- Location: Station Road, Pedavadlapudi, Guntur district, Andhra Pradesh; India
- Coordinates: 16.4144°N 80.6130°E
- System: Express train, Passenger train and Commuter rail station
- Owner: Indian Railways
- Operator: Indian Railways
- Line: Vijayawada–Gudur section
- Platforms: 3
- Tracks: 4

Construction
- Structure type: Standard (On ground)
- Parking: Yes
- Cycle facilities: Yes
- Accessible: Disabled access

Other information
- Status: Active
- Station code: PVD
- Zone(s): South Coast Railway
- Division(s): Vijayawada

History
- Opened: Between 1893 and 1896

Services
Preceding station	Indian Railways	Following station
Kolanukonda towards ?	Vijayawada–Gudur section	Chiluvur towards ?
Location
- Location within Andhra Pradesh Location within India

Pedavadlapudi railway station (station code: PVD) is an Indian Railways station in Pedavadlapudi of Andhra Pradesh. It lies on the Vijayawada–Gudur section of Howrah–Chennai main line and is administered under Vijayawada railway division of South Coast Railway zone.

== Classification ==
In terms of earnings and outward passengers handled, Pedavadlapudi is categorized as a Non-Suburban Grade-6 (NSG-6) railway station. Based on the re–categorization of Indian Railway stations for the period of 2017–18 and 2022–23, an NSG–6 category station earns nearly ₹1 crore and handles close to 1 million passengers.

== Infrastructure ==
The station building has three platforms. A new station building is under construction. The new building compromises of five platforms and five tracks. The station will have triple electrified line passing through: the Howrah–Chennai and New Delhi–Chennai main lines.
