= Mulugu Papayaradhya =

Telugu scholar (1756–1852)

Mulugu Papayaradhya, also known as Mulugu Papayya and Sangameswara Sastry, (1756–1852) was a Telugu and Sanskrit scholar, preceptor, translator, and writer, known for his translation of the Devi Bhagavatam from Sanskrit into Telugu and for being the preceptor and court poet of the Raja of Amaravati, Vasireddy Venkatadri Nayudu. Mulugu Papayaradhya was born to Viranaradhya, a prominent Veera Shaiva acharya, and Akkamba. He lived in Amaravati, now in the Guntur district of Andhra Pradesh. He is known to have written more than a hundred works in Telugu and Sanskrit. He was titled as Abhinava Kalidasa. He was a Veera Shaivite acharya (preceptor).

== Work ==
Mulugu Papayaradhya is regarded as the first poet to translate the Devi Bhagavata Purana into Telugu. This translation was done at the request of Vasireddy Venkatadri Nayudu's son, and Papayaradhya dedicated it to Kashi Vishwanatha, a form of Shiva. From the more than hundred works he wrote, Kalyanacampu, Ekadasivratacampu, Aryasati, Sivastotra, and Vedantasarasangraha are among the more prominent Sanskrit works. Papayaradhya also wrote the Ahalya Sankrandana Vilasamu.
