= Kaza, Guntur district =

Kaza
- Village
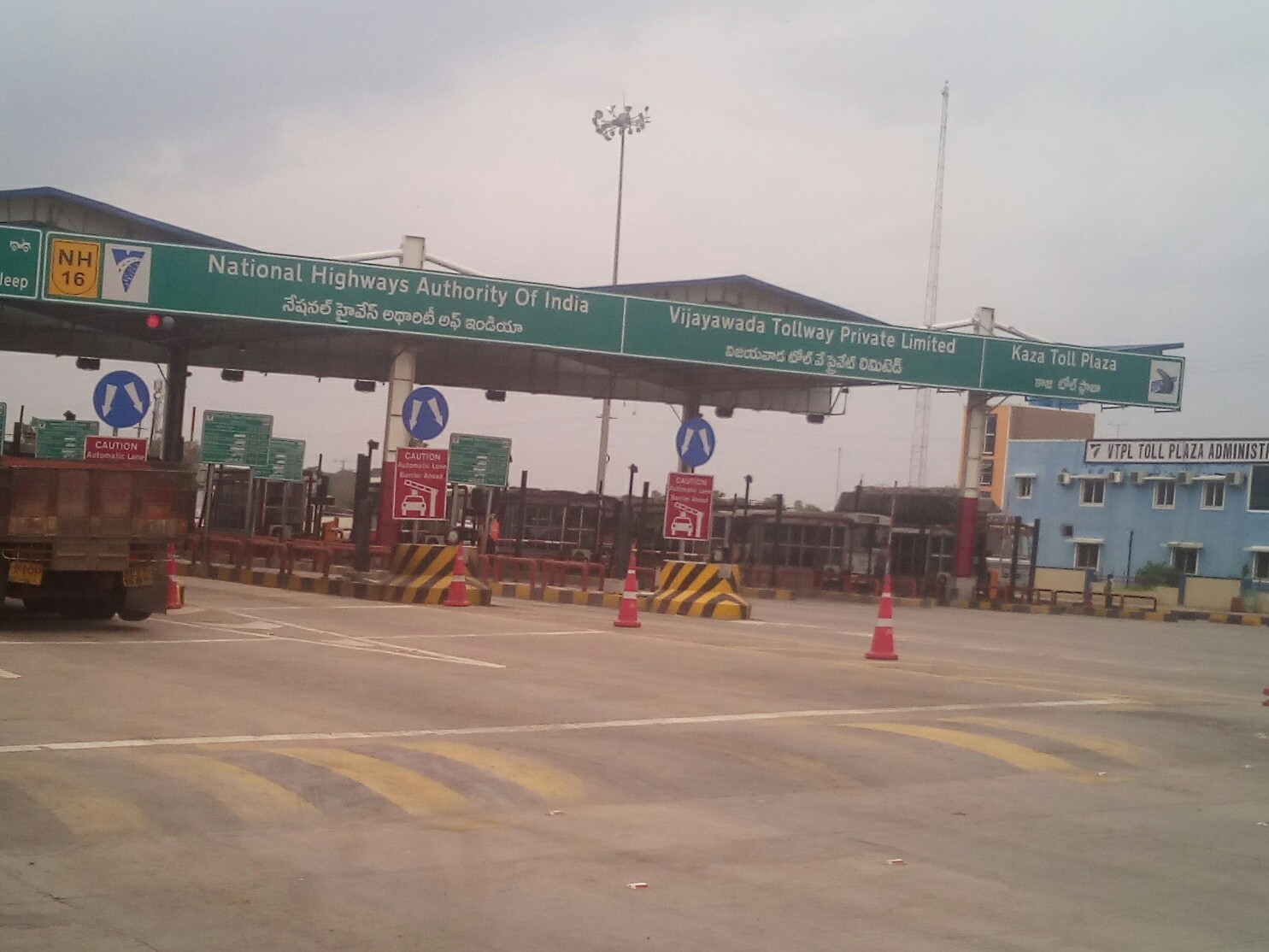
- Kaza toll plaza
- Interactive map of Kaza
- Location in Andhra Pradesh, India
- Coordinates: 16.3906°N 80.5425°E
- Country: India
- State: Andhra Pradesh
- District: Guntur
- Mandal: Mangalagiri

Government
  - Type: Panchayati raj
  - Body: Kaza gram panchayat

Area
  - Total: 1,818 ha (4,490 acres)

Population (2011)
  - Total: 10,148
  - Density: 558.2/km^{2} (1,446/sq mi)

Languages
  - Official: Telugu
- Time zone: UTC+5:30 (IST)
- PIN: 522503
- Area code: +91–863
- Vehicle registration: AP

Kaza is a village located in Guntur district, Andhra Pradesh, India. The commerce is driven by its proximity to NH-16 and Acharya Nagarajuna University. Kaza falls under Guntur revenue division. Saint Narayana Teertha was born here.

== Geography ==
Kaza is situated to the southwest of the mandal headquarters, Mangalagiri, at 16.3906°N 80.5425°E. It is spread over an area of 1,818 ha (4,490 acres).

== Demographics ==
As of 2011 Census of India, Kaza had a population of 10,148 with 2490 households. The total population constitute, 5,708 males and 4,440 females —a sex ratio of 779 females per 1000 males. 955 children are in the age group of 0–6 years, of which 485 are boys and 470 are girls —a ratio of 969 per 1000. The average literacy rate stands at 69.06% with 6,349 literates, significantly higher than the state average of 67.41%.

== Government and politics ==
Kaza gram panchayat is the local self-government of the village. It is divided into wards and each ward is represented by a ward member. The village forms a part of Andhra Pradesh Capital Region and is under the jurisdiction of APCRDA.

Kaza village is a part of Mangalagiri assembly constituency for Andhra Pradesh Legislative Assembly. The assembly segment is in a part of Guntur (Lok Sabha constituency).

== Education ==
As per the school information report for the academic year 2018–19, the village has a total of 4 schools. These include one MPP, 3 private schools.

== Transport ==
Kaza lies on National Highway 16. APSRTC provides bus services from nearest depot in Guntur to intrastate and interstate destinations. Apart from being accessible to many railway stations inside the city, the nearest railway station is Nagarjuna Nagar Halt. The Nambur Railway station in the city is closest major station to Kaza and is also being planned to become one of the junction stations in Guntur once the Amaravati railway line realises.

== See also ==
- List of villages in Guntur district
