= Emani, Guntur district =

Emani
- Village
- Interactive map of Emani
- Location in Andhra Pradesh, India
- Coordinates: 16.3287775°N 80.6563654°E
- Country: India
- State: Andhra Pradesh
- District: Guntur

Area
  - Total: 23.16 km^{2} (8.94 sq mi)
- Elevation: 15 m (49 ft)

Population (2011)
  - Total: 7,998
  - Density: 345.3/km^{2} (894.4/sq mi)

Languages
  - Official: Telugu
- Time zone: UTC+5:30 (IST)

Emani is a village in Guntur district of the Indian state of Andhra Pradesh. It is located in Duggirala mandal of Tenali revenue division.
