= Duggirala railway station =

Railway station in Duggirala, India

Duggirala
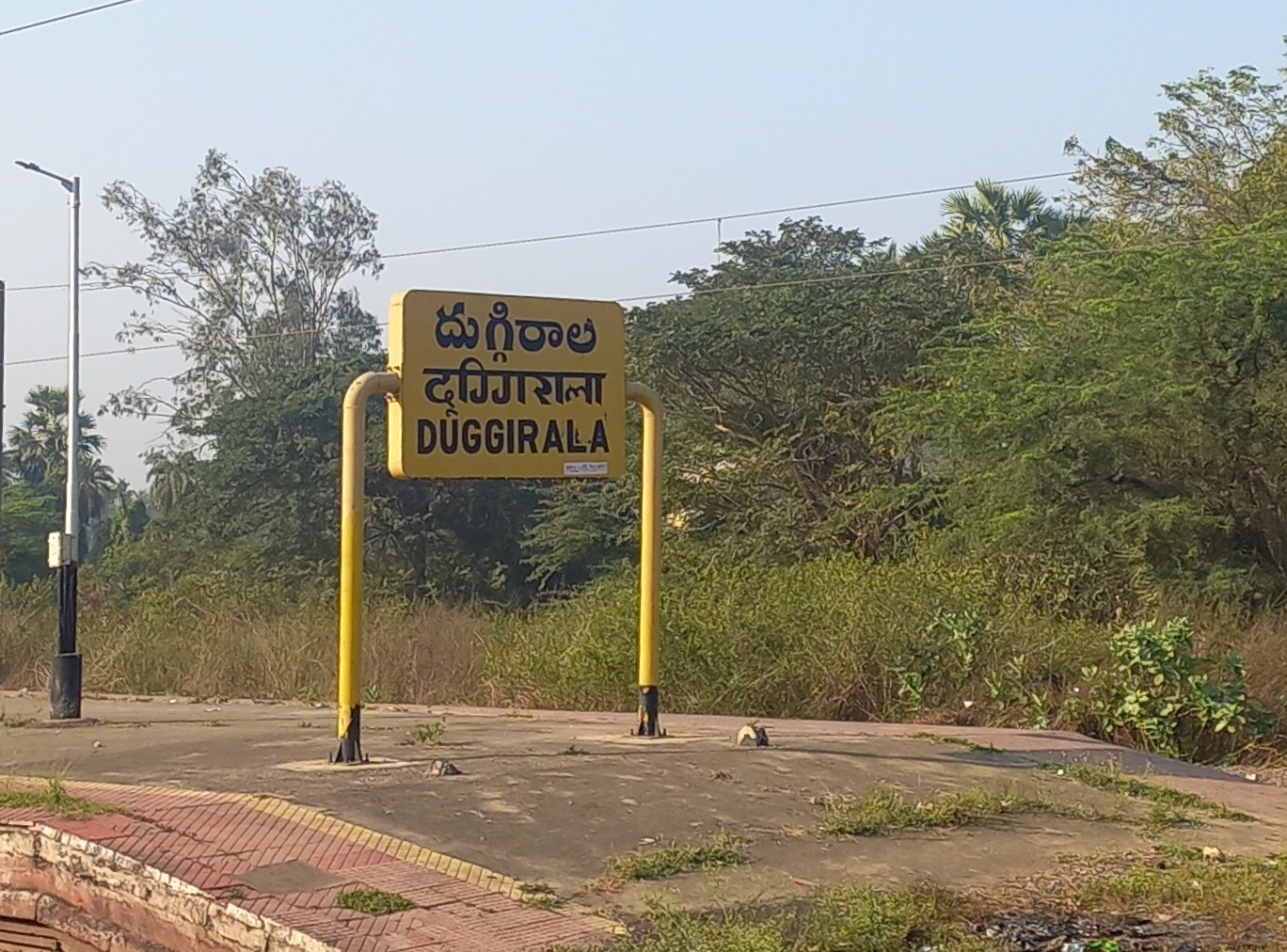

General information
- Location: Duggirala, Guntur district, Andhra Pradesh; India
- Coordinates: 16.3271°N 80.6280°E
- Operator: Indian Railways
- Line: Howrah–Chennai main line

Construction
- Structure type: Standard (on ground)
- Accessible: Disabled access

Other information
- Status: Active
- Station code: DIG
- Zone(s): South Coast Railway
- Division(s): Vijayawada

Services
Preceding station	Indian Railways	Following station
Chiluvur towards ?	Howrah–Chennai main line	Kolakaluru towards ?
Location
- Location within Andhra Pradesh Location within India
- Interactive map

Duggirala railway station (station code:DIG), is an Indian Railways station in Duggirala of Guntur district in Andhra Pradesh. It lies on the Howrah–Chennai main line and is administered under Vijayawada railway division of South Coast Railway zone.

== Classification ==
In terms of earnings and outward passengers handled, Duggirala is categorized as a Non-Suburban Grade-6 (NSG-6) railway station. Based on the re–categorization of Indian Railway stations for the period of 2017–18 and 2022–23, an NSG–6 category station earns nearly ₹1 crore and handles close to 1 million passengers.
