= Chiluvur railway station =

Railway station in Andhra Pradesh, India

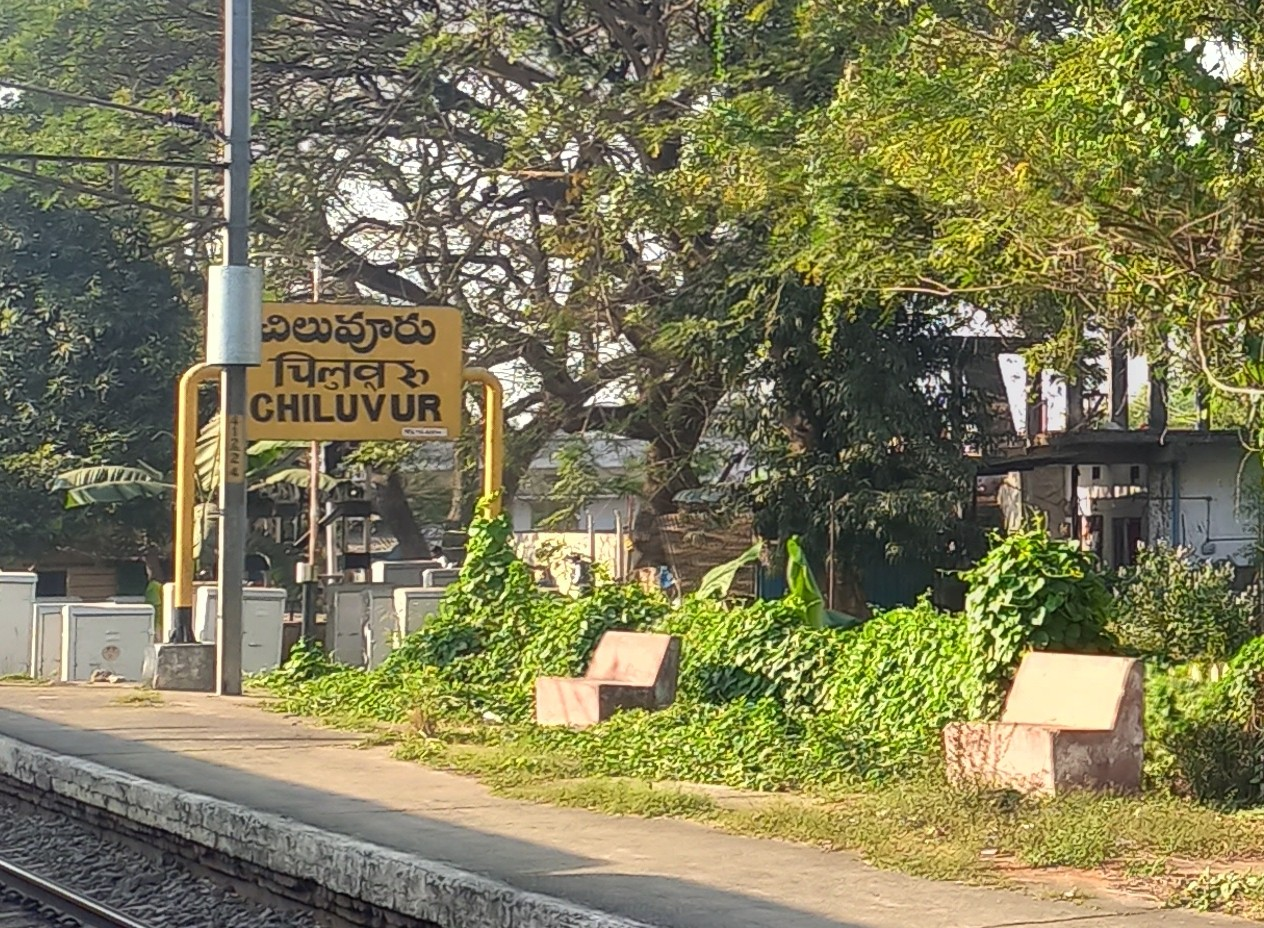

General information
- Location: Chiluvuru Railway Station, Chiluvur, Guntur district, Andhra Pradesh; India
- Coordinates: 16.3803°N 80.6172°E
- Operator: Indian Railways
- Line: Vijayawada–Gudur section
- Platforms: 2
- Tracks: 2

Construction
- Structure type: Standard (On ground)
- Accessible: Disabled access

Other information
- Status: Active
- Station code: CLVR
- Zone(s): South Central Railway
- Division(s): Vijayawada

Services
Preceding station	Indian Railways	Following station
Pedavadlapudi towards ?	Vijayawada–Gudur section	Duggirala towards ?
Location
- Location within Andhra Pradesh Location within India

Chiluvur railway station (station code:CLVR), is an Indian railway station in Chiluvur of Andhra Pradesh. It lies on the Vijayawada–Gudur section of Howrah–Chennai main line and is administered under Vijayawada railway division of South Central Railway zone.

== Classification ==
In terms of earnings and outward passengers handled, Chiluvur is categorized as a Halt Grade-2 (HG-2) railway station. Based on the re–categorization of Indian Railway stations for the period of 2017–18 and 2022–23, an HG–2 category station earns between ₹5–50 lakh and handles 1–3 lakh passengers.

== See also ==
- List of railway stations in India
