= Duggirala mandal =

Mandal in Guntur (Andhra Pradesh), India

- Mandal
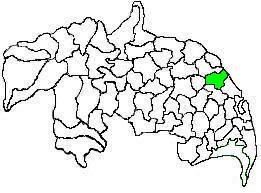
- Mandal map of Guntur district showing Duggirala mandal (in green)
- Interactive map of Duggirala mandal
- Location in Andhra Pradesh, India
- Coordinates: 16°19′40″N 80°37′27″E
- Country: India
- State: Andhra Pradesh
- District: Guntur
- Headquarters: Duggirala
- Mandal Parishad villages: 14

Government
  - Type: Panchayati raj (Block level)
  - Body: Mandal Parishad
  - Tehsildar: M.Sirisha

Population (2011)
  - Total: 62,655

Languages
- Time zone: UTC+5:30 (IST)

Duggirala mandal is one of the 18 mandals in Guntur district of the Indian state of Andhra Pradesh. It is under the administration of Tenali revenue division and the headquarters are located at Duggirala. The mandal is bounded by Mangalagiri, Pedakakani, Tenali and Kollipara mandals. Krishna River lies to the northeast of the Duggirala mandal.

== Demographics ==
As of 2011 census, the mandal had a population of 62,655. The total population constitute, 31,269 males and 31,386 females —a sex ratio of 1004 females per 1000 males. 5,947 children are in the age group of 0–6 years, of which 2,999 are boys and 2,948 are girls. The average literacy rate stands at 70.97% with 40,244 literates.

== Administration ==
As of 19 June 2014, the present tahsildar is M.Sirisha. It also forms a part of the Andhra Pradesh Capital Region under the jurisdiction of APCRDA. Duggirala mandal is one of the three mandals under Mangalagiri (Assembly constituency), which in turn represents Guntur (Lok Sabha constituency) of Andhra Pradesh.

== Towns and villages ==
As of 2011 census, the mandal has 15 villages and no towns. Duggirala is the most populated and Devarapalle Agraharam is the least populated villages in the mandal.

The settlements in the mandal are listed below:

1. Chiluvuru
2. Chinapalem
3. Chintalapudi
4. Devarapalle Agraharam
5. Duggirala(†)
6. Emani
7. Godavarru
8. Kantamraju Konduru
9. Morampudi
10. Pedakondur
11. Penumuli
12. Perakalapudi
13. Srungarapuram
14. Tummapudi
15. Veerlapalem

Note: (†)-Mandal headquarters

== Education ==
The mandal plays a major role in education for the rural students of the nearby villages. The primary and secondary school education is imparted by government, aided and private schools, under the School Education Department of the state. As per the school information report for the academic year 2015–16, the mandal has more than 7,480 students enrolled in over 72 schools.

== See also ==
- List of mandals in Andhra Pradesh
- Villages in Duggirala mandal
