= Chintapalli, Palnadu district =

Chintapalli చింతపల్లి Chintapalle
- Village
- Location in Andhra Pradesh, India
- Coordinates: 16.6898°N 80.1403°E
- Country: India
- State: Andhra Pradesh
- District: Palnadu

Government
  - Type: Gram Panchayat

Population
  - Total: 4,547

Languages
  - Official: Telugu
- Time zone: UTC+5:30 (IST)
- PIN: 522409

Chintapalli (చింతపల్లి) is a village in the Atchampet mandal of Palnadu district, Andhra Pradesh, India on the southern bank of the Krishna River. It is the site of the former headquarters of Vasireddy Venkatadri Nayudu's zamindari estate in the late 18th century. Nayudu abandoned Chintapalli in protest of alleged mistreatment by his overlords, the British East India Company, and constructed a new capital at Amaravathi.

== Demographics ==
As of the 2011 census, the town has a population of 4,547 of which 2,272 are males and 2,275 are females. Population of Children with age of 0-6 is 501 which is 11.02% of total population of Chintapalli. The literacy rate of Chintapalli is 52.60%, lower than the state average of 67.02%.
