= Nutakki =

- Village
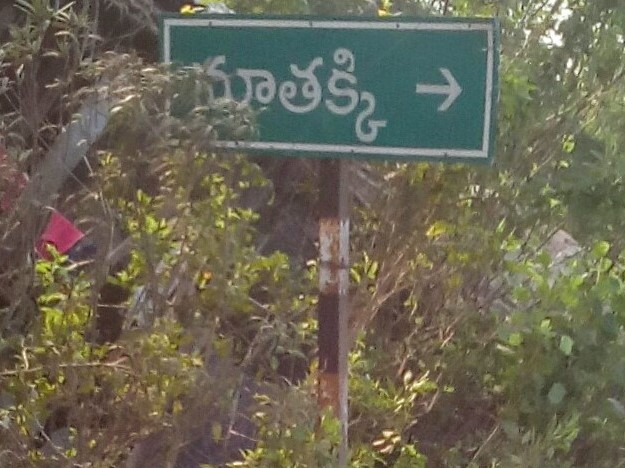
- Directional signboard of Nutakki village
- Interactive map of Nutakki
- Location in Andhra Pradesh, India
- Coordinates: 16.29217°N 80.33243°E
- Country: India
- State: Andhra Pradesh
- District: Guntur
- Mandal: Mangalagiri

Government
  - Type: Panchayati raj
  - Body: Nutakki gram panchayat

Area
  - Total: 1,122 ha (2,770 acres)

Population (2011)
  - Total: 9,236
  - Density: 823.2/km^{2} (2,132/sq mi)

Languages
  - Official: Telugu
- Time zone: UTC+5:30 (IST)
- PIN: 522303
- Area code: +91–8645
- Vehicle registration: AP

Nutakki is a village in Guntur district of the Indian state of Andhra Pradesh. It is located in Mangalagiri mandal part of Mangalagiri Tadepalle Municipal Corporation part of Guntur revenue division.

== Geography ==
Nutakki is situated to the east of the mandal headquarters, Mangalagiri, at 16.29217°N 80.33243°E. It is spread over an area of 1,122 ha (2,770 acres).

== Governance ==
Nutakki gram panchayat is the local self-government of the village. It is divided into wards and each ward is represented by a ward member. The village forms a part of Andhra Pradesh Capital Region and is under the jurisdiction of APCRDA.

== Education ==
As per the school information report for the academic year 2018–19, the village has a total of 7 schools. These include 4 MPP and 3 private schools.

== See also ==
- List of villages in Guntur district
