= Narasimha Temple, Bhubaneswar =

Narasimha Temple
- Location in Odisha

Religion
- Affiliation: Hinduism
- District: Khurda
- Deity: Narasimha

Location
- Location: Bhubaneswar
- State: Odisha
- Country: India
- Coordinates: 20°15′11″N 85°50′36″E

Architecture
- Type: Kalingan Style (Kalinga Architecture)
- Completed: 14-15th century CE
- Elevation: 20 m (66 ft)

Narasimha Temple is a 14th–15th-century Hindu temple in Bhubaneswar city of the Indian state of Odisha.

The time period of its construction is estimated from its architectural features. Its tradition and legends are same as the Gosagaresvara temple. It is situated in the precinct of Gosagaresvara on the southeastern side of Gosagaresvara Shiva and Paradaresvara Shiva temples. The presiding deity is a four armed Narasimha image seating on a pedestal. His upper left hand holding a conch, upper right hand holds a disk while in his major left and right hand are busy in killing the demon. The base of the pedestal is carved with series of females, in anjalii mudra. The cella measures 1.15 square metres and is facing towards west.

== Physical description ==
=== Surroundings ===
The temple surrounded by Sanisvara Siva temple in west, Paradaresvara Siva and Gosagaresvara Siva temple in the north western corner and Isanesvara in the north eastern corner.

=== Orientation ===
The temple is facing towards west.

=== Architectural features (plan and elevation) ===
The temple stands over a low pista. On plan, temple is pancharatha with a square vimana measuring 2.10 square metres and a frontal porch of 0.40 metres. On elevation, temple is in pidha order with usual bada, gandi and mastaka measuring 3.38 metres in height from bottom to top. The bada measuring 1.28 metres has threefold divisions in which pabhaga measures 0.38 metres, jangha 0.73 metres and baranda measures 0.27 metres in height. The gandi measures 1.15 metres and the mastaka 0.95 in height.

== Condition of the temple ==
The temple was repaired by the Orissa State Archaeology under X and XI Finance Commission Award and presently maintained by the locals living around the temple. At the moment the temple is in a good state.

Detached sculptures of a four armed Ganesha and a lingam made of sandstone are there inside the sanctum.
