= Vasireddy Venkatadri Nayudu =

Raja of Amaravathi from 1783 to 1816

Vasireddy Venkatadri Naidu
- Zamindar
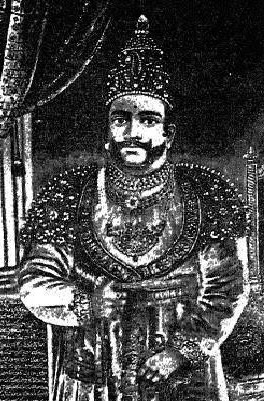
- Portrait of Venkatadri Nayudu

Raja of Amaravathi
- Reign: 1783–1816
- Predecessor: Vasireddy Jagga Bhupathi
- Successor: Vasireddy Jagannatha Babu
- Born: 27 April 1761; Andhra Pradesh
- Died: 17 August 1817 (aged 56)
- Parents: Jagga Bhupathi

Vasireddy Venkatadri Nayudu (27 April 1761 – 17 August 1817), of the Vasireddy clan, was the hereditary zamindar of Chintapalli, later Amaravathi, under the Nizam of Hyderabad and later the British East India Company. He had under his control 552 villages and towns located in Guntur and Krishna districts and their environs. Discontented with the treatment by the East India Company, he abandoned his hereditary palace at Chintapalli and founded a new palace and town called Amaravathi at the site of the ancient Satavahana capital next to Dharanikota. (Note: The Satavahana capital was called "Dhanyakataka". The modern day remnant of the capital was a village called Dharanikota, which is mentioned in history books as the site of the former capital. The new town of "Amaravathi" was built next to it, and turns out to have broken into the site of the original capital as well. In due course, it grew to encompass the older village of Dharanikota. The classical-sounding name "Amaravathi" is probably derived from the name of the pre-existing Amareswara temple, but there is no evidence of Satavahanas having used that name in their own times.) He was among the earliest native nobles to openly defy the British East India Company and resist their arbitrary revenue impositions.

== Family ==
The Vasireddy zamindari clan belonged to Kamma community and may have been founded by Vasireddy Verappanaidu, who obtained appointment as a Deshmukh of the Nandigama pargana in 1670 under the Golkonda Sultanate. Shortly afterwards, Golkonda became part of the Mughal Empire, but his estate was apparently continued. After his death, the estate got divided among his three sons, Ramanna, Jagganna and Venkatadrinaidu, with Jagganna receiving the estate of Chintapalli in the Guntur district (16.6898°N 80.1397°E).

Vasireddy Venkatadri Nayudu was born on 27 April 1761 to Jagganna (Jagga Bhupathi) and his wife Acchamamba. According to journalist Potturi Venkateswara Rao, Jagganna fought against the Nizam and died when Venkatadri Naidu was at very small age. After the death of Jagga Bhupathi his wife Acchamamba committed Sati.

Venkatadri Nayudu, then four year old, was brought up by his uncle Ramanna. After the death of Ramanna, it would appear that Nayudu inherited the estates of both his father and his uncle.

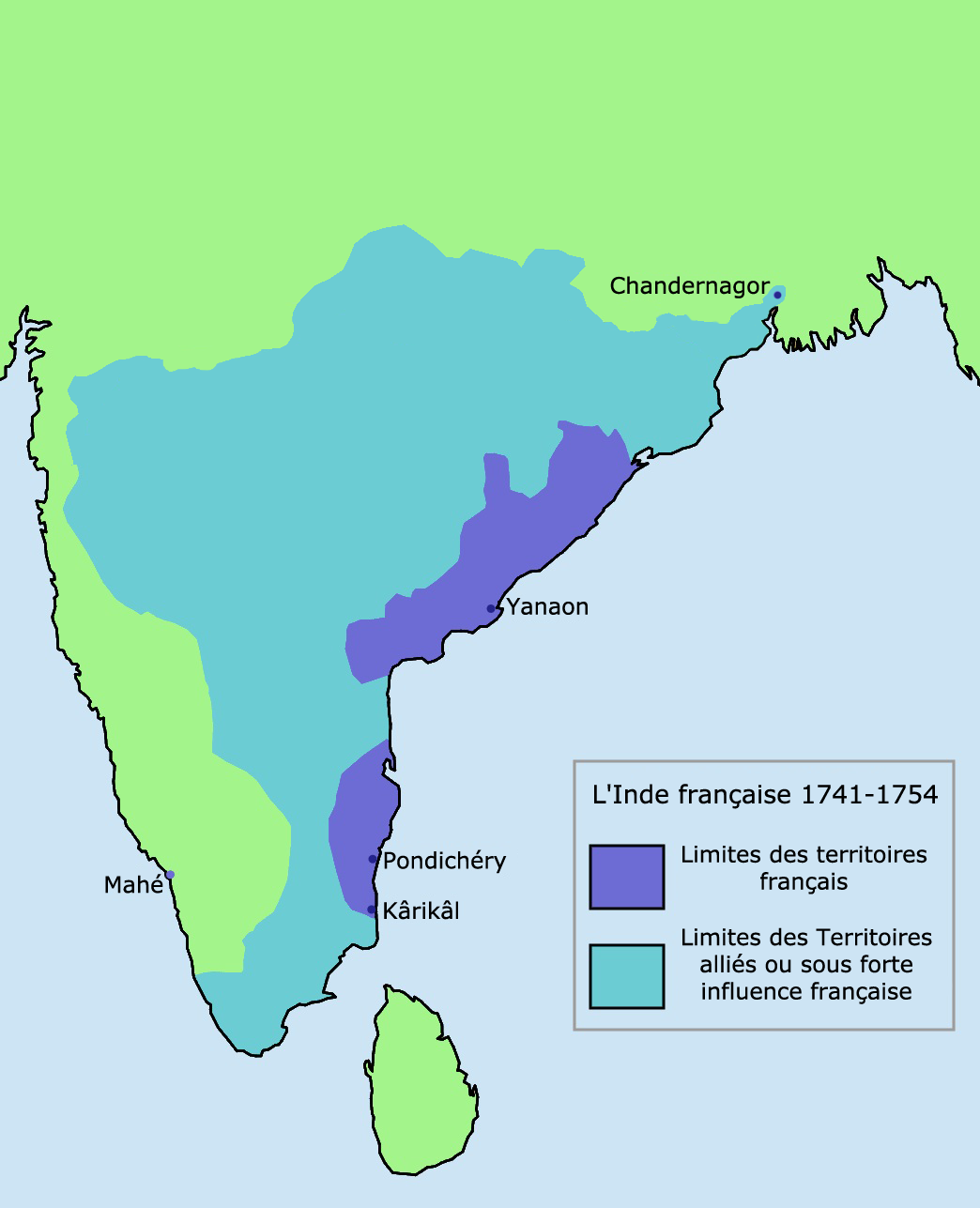
French influence in South India 1741–1754

British influence in India, 1763

Meanwhile, the power balance in South India was in a flux. The five coastal districts that came to be known as Northern Circars became the key ground for Anglo-French rivalry. The fourth Nizam, Salabat Jang, ceded control over them to the French East India Company in return for their help in his accession. The French control however ended with the British conquest of Masulipatnam in 1759. The British East India Company received the grant of the Circars from the Mughal emperor Shah Alam II in 1765, confirmed by the Nizam in 1768. The Guntur district, excluded in the initial grant, was also ceded in 1788. The British were now the overlords of the Vasireddy family.

== Reign ==
Vasireddy Venkatadri Naidu was crowned the ruler in the year 1783, when the Guntur district was under the control of Nizam with British assistance. He ruled until 1816. The original seat of power was Chintapalli in the present-day Guntur district. Later Naidu shifted his capital to a new town called Amaravathi, built next to Dharanikota on the bank of the Krishna River. During the construction of the town, his workers unearthed the Amaravati Stupa. He was a patron of the arts and literature, and a builder of numerous temples in the Krishna river delta. He renovated the ancient temples at Amaravathi, Chebrolu, Mangalagiri, and Ponnuru.

Venkatadri successfully eliminated Pindaris who were robbing the people in Guntur region. During his reign, Chenchus (forest tribe) were raiding villages around Amaravathi. Venkatadri invited about 600 of the Chenchu men to a luncheon and ordered them to be killed. The villages where this incident took place is today called Narukulapadu ('Naruku' in Telugu language means 'to axe' or 'to chop'). After this incident the Rajah became repentant and came to Amaravathi and devoted his entire life, time and revenues to building temples to Lord Siva. He renovated the Amareswaraswamy temple here, got nine learned archakas to be brought for the daily archana of the Lord, and provided them with all the needs of livelihood, including 12 acres (49,000 m^{2}) of land to each. The temple as it stands now owes much to him.

Venkatadri was assisted by a very able minister and poet Mulugu Papayaradhya. There were several poets and scholars in the court of Venkatadri.

== Gallery of fort in Amaravathi ==
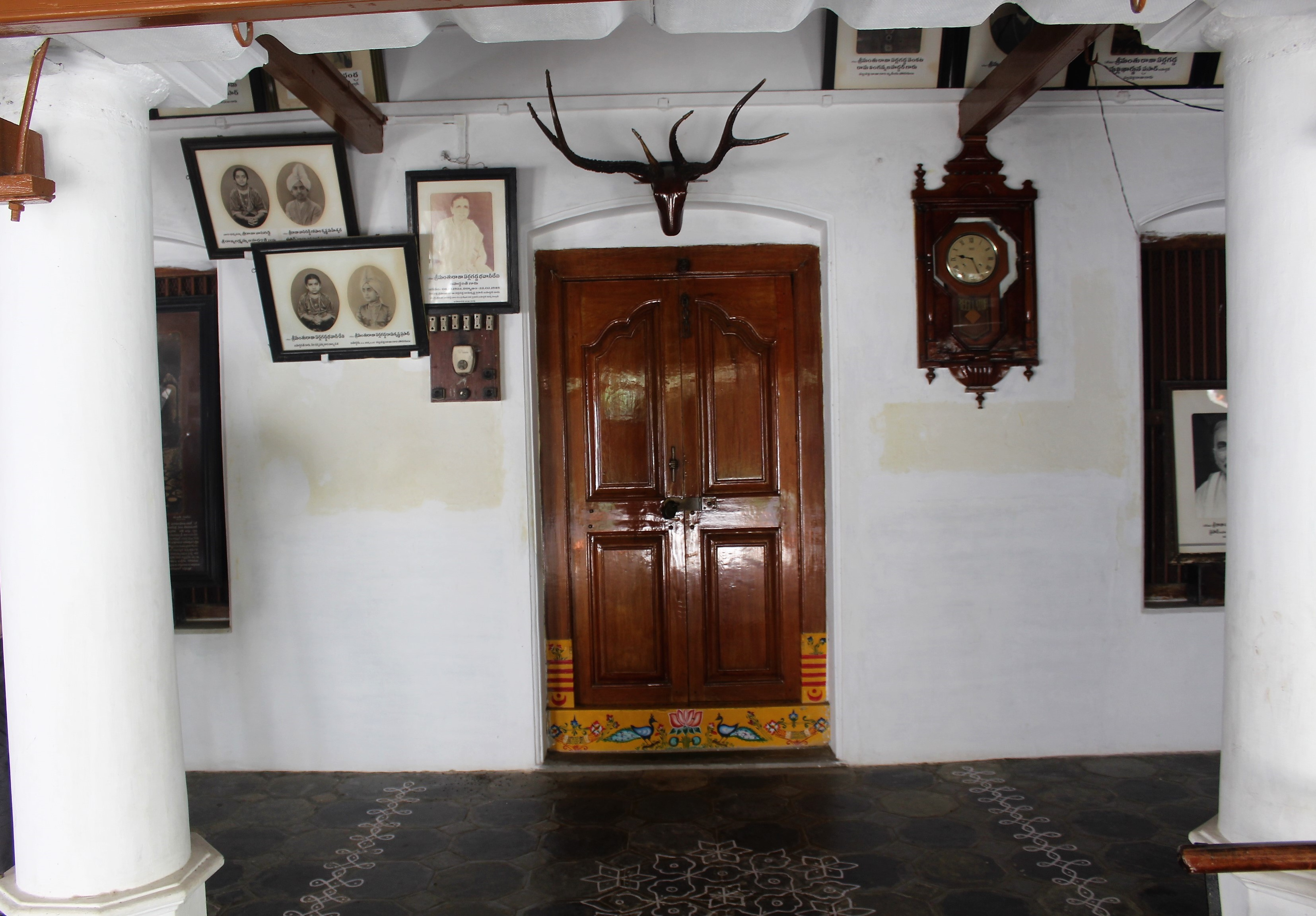
Venkatadri Naidu Fort Amaravathi

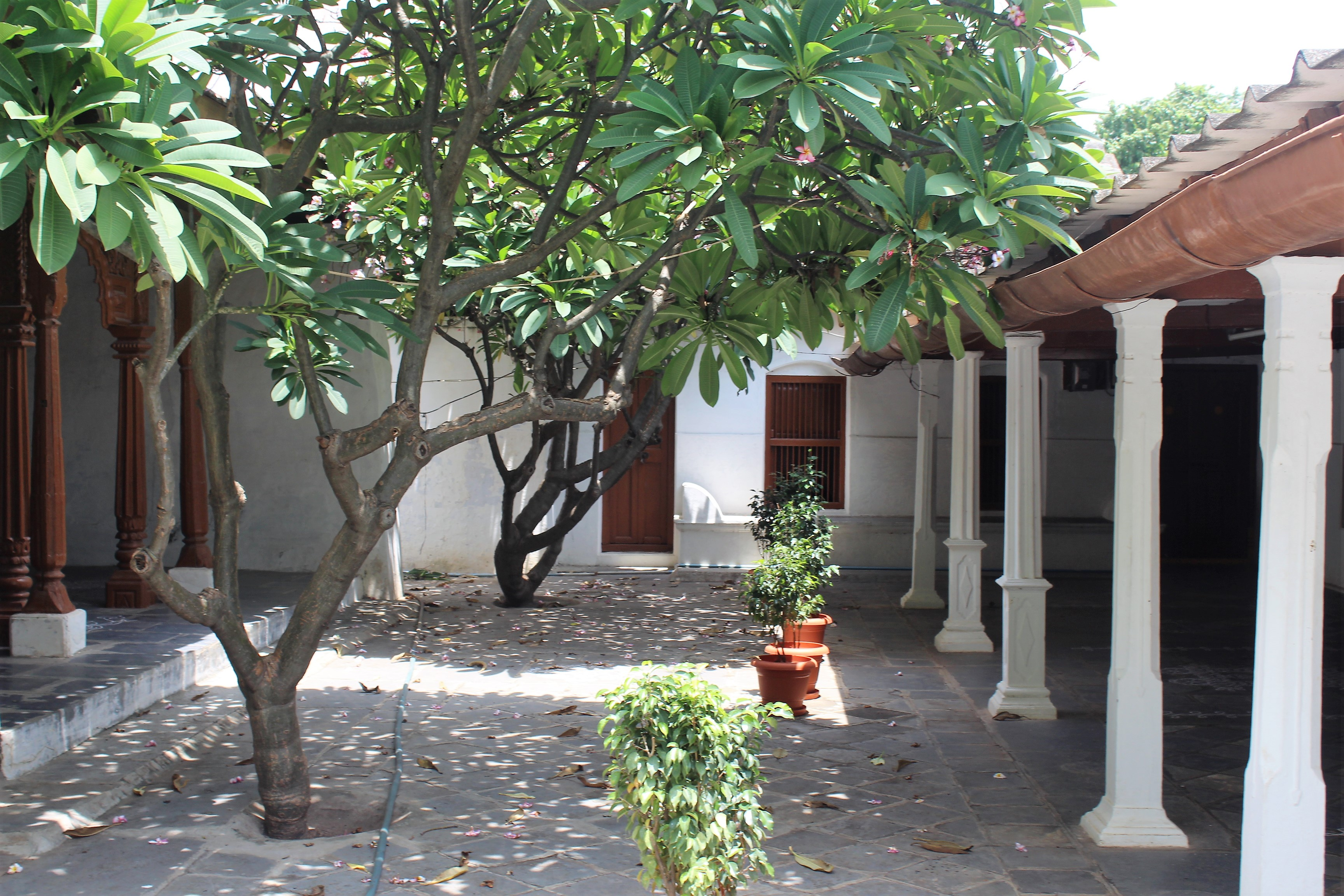
Venkatadri Naidu Fort Amaravathi, View from Entrance

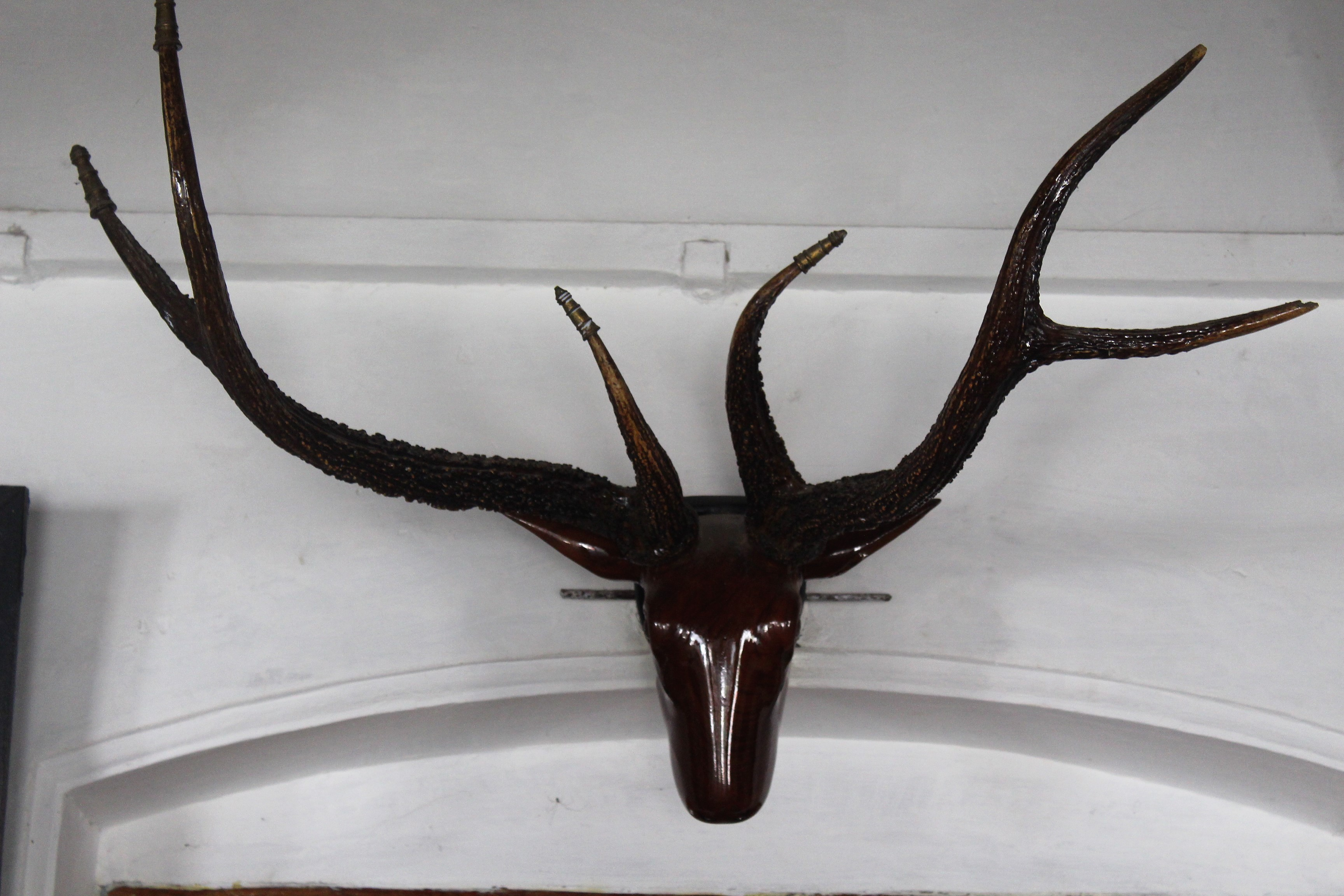
Stag Structure at Venkatadri Naidu Fort Amaravathi

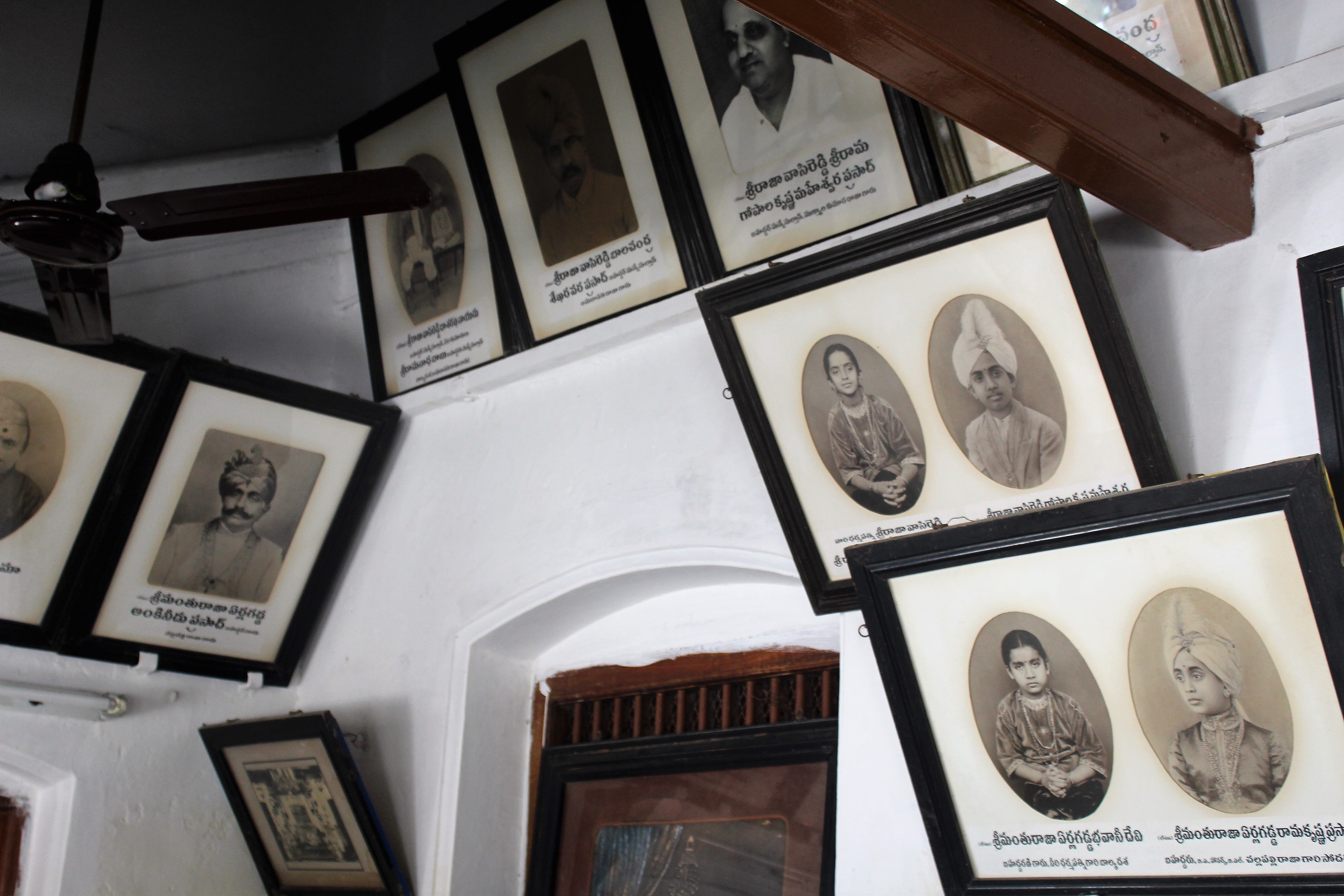
Photographs at Venkatadri Naidu Fort Amaravathi

== Bibliography ==
- Frykenberg, Robert Eric (2011), "Elite Groups in a South Indian District: 1788–1858", The Journal of Asian Studies, 24 (2): 261–281, doi:10.2307/2050565, JSTOR 2050565, S2CID 153984852
- Ramaswami, N. S. (1971). Indian Monuments. Abhinav Publications. ISBN 978-0-89684-091-1.
