= Mangalagiri - Tadepalli =

- City
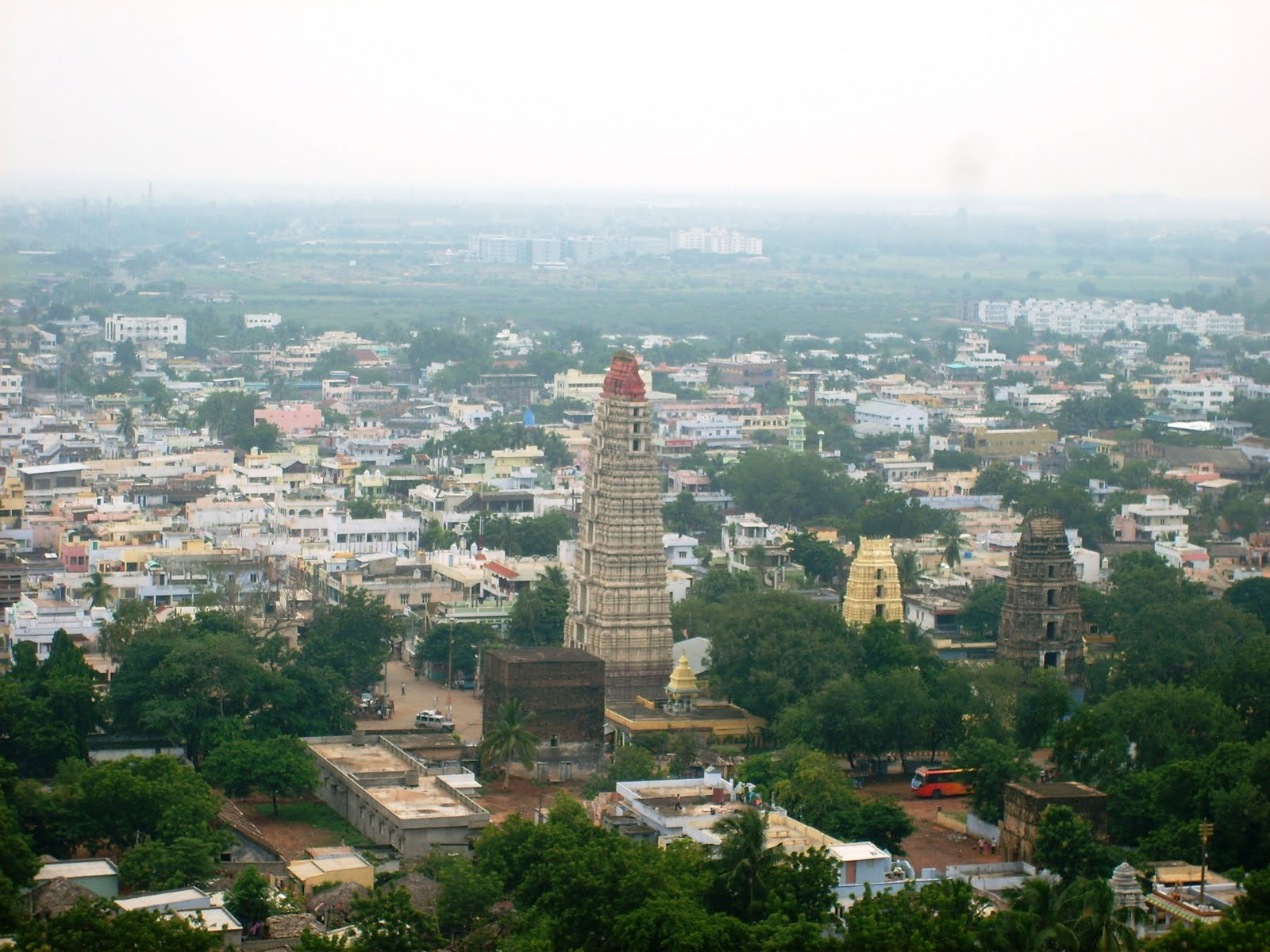
- View of Mangalagiri neighborhood

- Location within Andhra Pradesh
- Coordinates: 16.43°N 80.55°E
- Country: India
- State: Andhra Pradesh
- District: Guntur
- Established: 225 B.C.
- Named for: The Auspicious Hill

Government
  - Type: Municipal corporation (India)
  - Body: Mangalagiri Tadepalli Municipal Corporation(MTMC); APCRDA
  - MLA: Nara Lokesh (Telugu Desam Party)
- Elevation: 43 m (141 ft)

Population (2024)
  - Total: 320,197

Languages
  - Official language: Telugu
- Time zone: UTC+5:30 (IST)
- PIN: 522503
- Telephone code: 91–8645
- Vehicle registration: AP–07 (former) AP-39 (new)
- Lok Sabha constituency: Guntur
- Assembly constituency: Mangalagiri
- Website: mangalagiri.cdma.ap.gov.in

Mangalagiri - Tadepalli is one of the two cities in Guntur district, Andhra Pradesh, India. It was established on 23 March 2021 by combining Managalagiri and Tadepalli towns and adjacent villages. It is situated on National Highway 16 and north of district headquarter Guntur. It is administered by Mangalagiri–Tadepalli Municipal Corporation.

== Etymology ==
The name is a Portmanteau of Mangalagiri and Tadepalli.

Mangalagiri translates to The Auspicious Hill (Mangala = Auspicious, Giri = Hill) in the local language. It was derived from the name Totadri. During Vijayanagara Kingdom rule, it was also known as Mangala Nilayam.

The origin of the name Tadepalli is believed to be related to the Palm tree 'Thati' and 'palle' meaning village.

== History ==
The picturesque hill was visited by the great Sri Krishna Deva Raya. Near the foot of the stone flight of steps is a stone pillar, with Telugu inscriptions on all sides, recording grants of villages. It is dated to 1520 and mentions the capture of Kondavidu by Timmarusu, general of Sri Krishnadevaraya, in 1515 from the Gajapati rulers of Kalinga (ancient Odisha). Another stone near the temple of Garudalvar has inscriptions on four sides recording grants in the reign of Sadasiva Raya of Vijayanagara Empire in 1538. The lofty gopuram in the temple at the foot of the hill was erected by Raja Vasireddy Venkatadri Nayudu in 1807–1809, and in terms of sculpture and architecture this temple stands to be an ultimate testament for the ancient vishwakarma sthapathis in planning and sculpting these temples.

Mangalagiri was under the rule of Golkonda Nawabs for a long period. It was raided in 1780 by Hyder Jung but could not be conquered. In 1816, a gang of Pindaris again looted the place. It slowly recovered from these two attacks during the time of Raja Vasireddy Venkatadri Nayudu who ruled the place from Amaravati. There is a big koneru (tank) in the center of the place which went dry in 1882. As many as 9,840 guns and 44 bullets which might have been related to Pindaris have been found here after the Pindaris looted this place.

In the 1970s there was huge water scarcity in Mangalagiri. Goli Gopala Rao, the then Municipal Chairman of Mangalagiri, brought water to the town through water pipelines and he was called "Apara Baghiratha" due to his services to the public.

As of 2011 Census of India, the Mangalagiri town had a population of 73,613 with 19,137 households. The total population constitute, 36,532 males and 37,081 —a sex ratio of 1015 females per 1000 males. 7,706 children are in the age group of 0–6 years, of which 3,894 are boys and 3,812 are girls —a ratio of 979 per 1000. The average literacy rate stands at 76.16% with 50,197 literates, significantly higher than the state average of 67.41%.

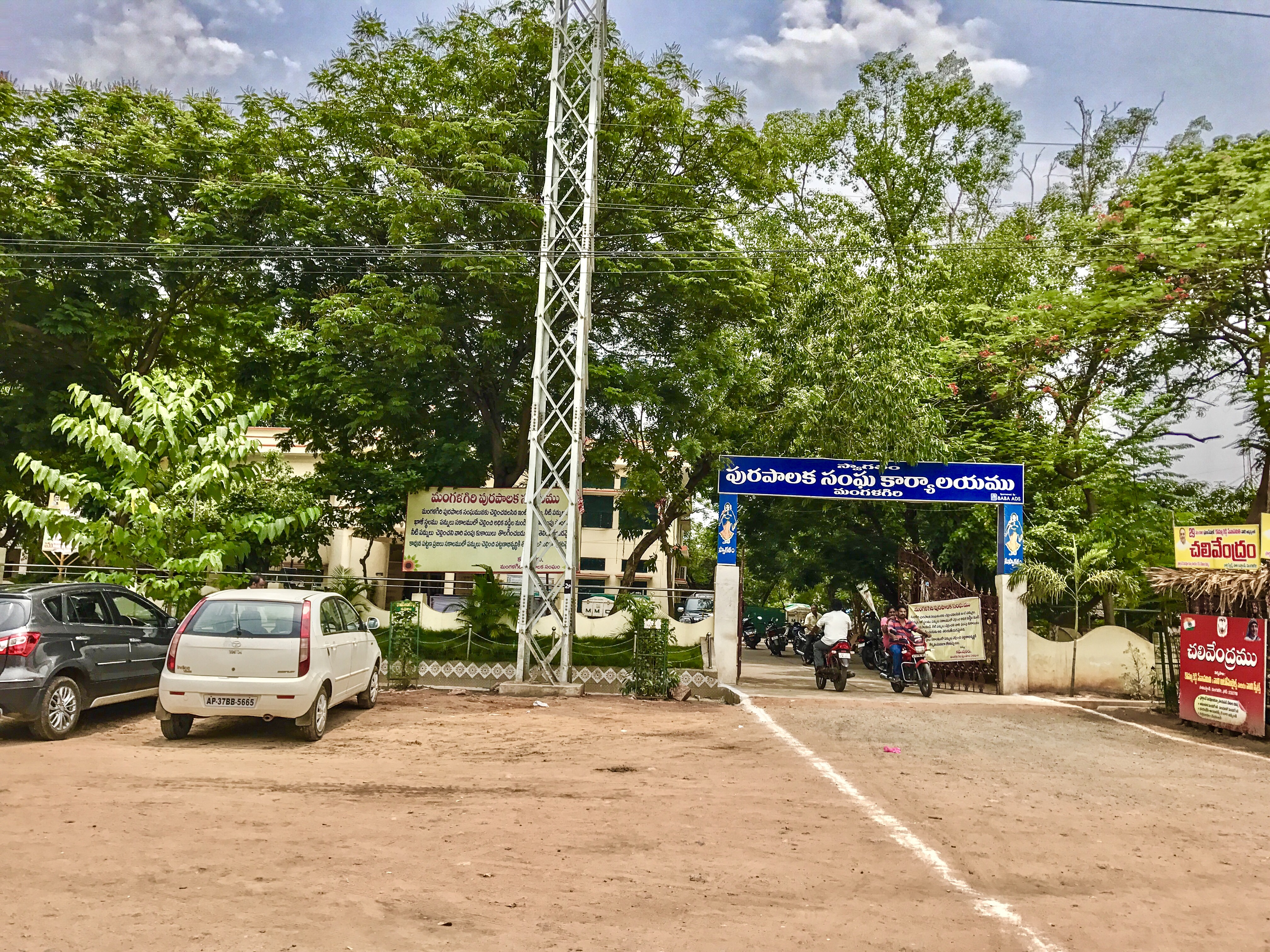
Mangalagiri Municipal Office

Each town was administered by a municipal office till 2021. Mangalagiri town was spread over 42.84 sq km. In 2015, the Mangalagiri municipality received Green Leaf Awards 2015 in the category of Best Municipality, which was organized by NGO Sukuki Exnora. Mangalagiri municipality and its out growths of Navuluru and Atmakur are a part of Vijayawada urban agglomeration.

Tadepalli Municipality was constituted in the year 2009. It was classified as a First Grade municipality and had 34 municipal wards. With the merger of all the 10 villages of the Tadepalli mandal in Tadepalli, the town had a population of 99,248 according to the Census 2011. It was spread over an area of 61.76 km^{2} (23.85 sq mi).

The Mangalagiri town has a total road length of 109.30 km (67.92 mi).

Ten villages namely Pedavadlapudi, Chinakakani, Kaza, Nutakki, Chinavadlapudi, Ramachandrapuram, Atamakuru, Nowluru, Yerrabalem, Nidamarru, Bethapudi are merged into Mangalagiri Tadepalli Municipal Corporation. The issue of the merger of the villages is now pending in the court. Government order was issued on 23 March 2021 constituting the larger urban area.

== Geography ==
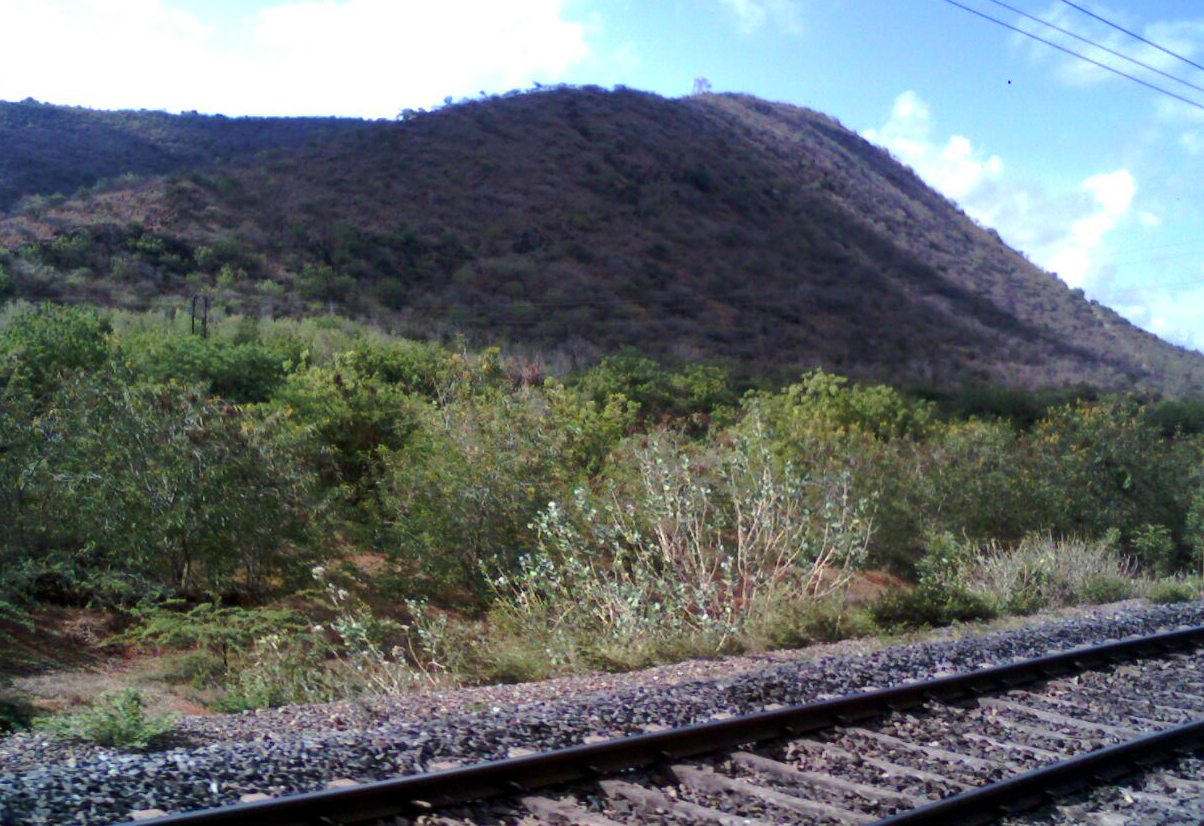
View of Mangalagiri Hills

The city is located at 16.43°N 80.55°E. It has an average elevation of 29.08 m (95.4 ft). It is located 22 kilometres (14 mi) north east of the district headquarters, Guntur. It lies on hilly terrain. It falls under Seismic Zone 3.

== Climate ==
The climate is tropical. The hottest months are from March–May and the coolest months from December–January. It receives south-west monsoon in the months of July–October and north–east monsoons in mid December. The average annual rainfall is 50–60 cm (20–24 in). The summer temperatures varies from 44–46 °C (111–115 °F) and the winter temperatures from 22–23 °C (72–73 °F).

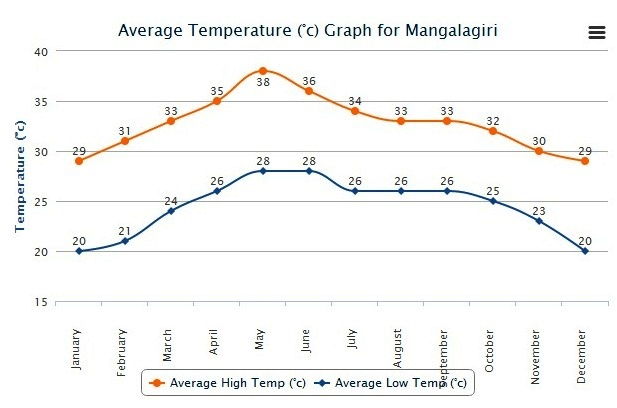

== Governance ==
=== Civic Administration ===
Mangalagiri - Tadepalli Municipal Corporation

Mangalagiri Tadepalli Municipal Corporation has a total of 50 election wards. The composition of the municipality is of two types, one is Elected Wing, headed by Municipal Council and the second is Executive Wing, headed by Municipal commissioner.

=== Politics ===
The city is a part of Mangalagiri Assembly constituency for Andhra Pradesh Legislative Assembly. Nara lokesh is the MLA of the constituency representing TDP. The assembly segment is in turn a part of Guntur Lok Sabha constituency, which was won by Pemmasani of TDP.

== Economy ==
The production of handcrafted dyed fabric is the major occupation of the city, which is as old as 500 years. Mangalagiri Sarees and Fabrics was registered as one of the geographical indication from Andhra Pradesh.

== Tourism ==
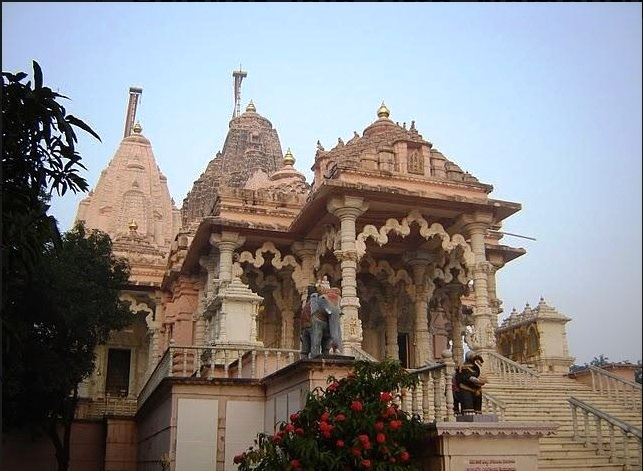
Hinkar Thirtha Jain Temple

Lakshmi Narasimha Temple is the abode of Lord Vishnu, who manifested himself as Thotadri, is present in Mangalagiri. There are three Narasimha Swamy temples. Undavalli caves, located in Undavalli, near Tadepalli are a specimen of Indian rock-cut architecture. The historic caves are located at the top of the hills overlooking the Krishna river, built during the 4th-5th century. Dedicated to Ananta Padmanabha Swamy and Narasimha Swamy, Undavalli Cave Temples are associated with the Vishnukundina kings. Hinkar Thirtha Jain Temple, located in Namburu, is the largest Jain temple in the region, visited by many Jains, from different parts of the state.

== Transport ==
The city is located on NH 16 that connects Kolkata and Chennai. The Tenali-Mangalagiri road is a part of the core road network of the district, that connects the town with the city of Tenali.

Mangalagiri bus station is owned and operated by APSRTC. The station is also equipped with a bus depot for operation and maintenance of buses. Mangalagiri railway station situated on the Vijayawada-Guntur main line, administered under the jurisdiction of Guntur railway division of South Central Railway zone.

Vijayawada International Airport at Gannavaram is the nearest airport.

There is a proposal of making Mangalagiri railway station a junction station by connecting the town with Tenali railway station in order to make the transportation from Guntur, Tenali, Amaravathi, Vijayawada cities easier.

APSRTC City Bus Routes

Route number	Start	End	Via
20	Madhura Nagar	Mangalagiri	Labbipet, Varadhi, Manipal Hospital, Mangalagiri
47H	Vijayawada Railway Station	Chinna Kakani	Railway Station, Pnbs, Varadhi, Manipal Hospital, Mangalagiri, Chinna Kakani
47N	Kaleswarao Market	NRI Hospital	Kaleswararao Market, Pnbs, Varadhi, Manipal Hospital, Mangalagiri, Nri Hospital
47V	Vijayawada Railway Station	Mangalagiri	Railway Station, Pnbs, Varadhi, Manipal Hospital, Mangalagiri
20/47	Railway station	Mangalgiri	Pnbs, Krishna Lanka, Varadhi, Tadepalli East, kunchanapalli x roads
47/20	Railway station	Mangalgiri	Pnbs, Krishna Lanka, Varadhi, Tadepalli Bus Station, Nulakapet, Dolas Nagar

== Education ==
C. K. High School and C. K. Junior College & V.T.J.M &I.V.T.R degree college are first school and college respectively. The primary and secondary school education is imparted by government, aided and private schools, under the School Education Department of the state. The medium of instruction followed by different schools are English, Telugu and Urdu.

The town has many schools and colleges. University campuses include VIT-AP University and SRM AP University. AIIMS for the state of Andhra Pradesh was sanctioned and is decided to set up in the town.

== Sports ==
Mangalagiri International Cricket Stadium is under construction in Mangalagiri at a distance of 2 km from the city and comes in the vicinity of Nowlur.

== See also ==
- Largest Indian cities by GDP
