= Navuluru =

Neighbourhood in Amaravati, Andhra Pradesh, India

Navuluru నవులూరు Nowlur
- Neighbourhood
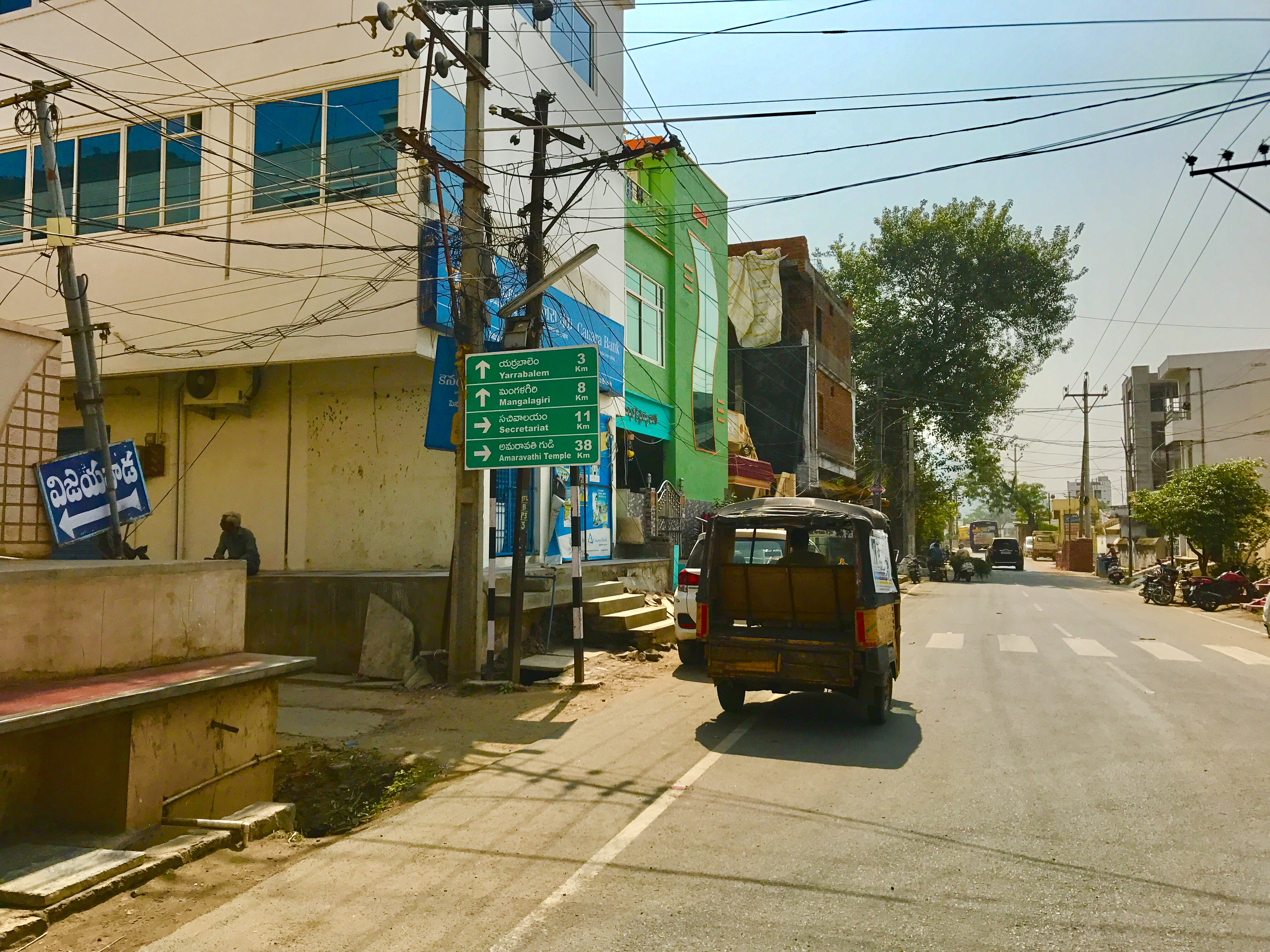
- Board showing Directions to Yerrabalem

- Location in Andhra Pradesh, India
- Coordinates: 16°26′37″N 80°33′28″E
- Country: India
- State: Andhra Pradesh
- District: Guntur
- Mandal: Mangalagiri

Area
  - Total: 250 km^{2} (97 sq mi)

Population (2011)
  - Total: 24,861
  - Density: 99/km^{2} (260/sq mi)

Languages
  - Official: Telugu
- Time zone: UTC+5:30 (IST)
- PIN: 522502

Navuluru (నవులూరు) is a neighbourhood in Amaravati, Andhra Pradesh, India. It is a part of Urban Notified Area of Amaravati. It was an out growth of Mangalagiri Municipality in Guntur district, prior to its merger in the urban area of the state capital.

== Geography ==
Navuluru is located at 16.4443°N 80.5383°E.

== Demographics ==
As of 2011 census, Navuluru had a population of 24,861. The total population constitute, 12,431 males and 12,430 females —a sex ratio of 999 females per 1000 males. 2,598 children are in the age group of 0–6 years, of which 1,321 are boys and 1,277 are girls. The average literacy rate stands at 68.19% with 15,180 literates, significantly higher than the state average of 67.41%.

== Transport ==
Mangalagiri is the nearest railway station to the out growth.
