= Pedavadlapudi =

- Village
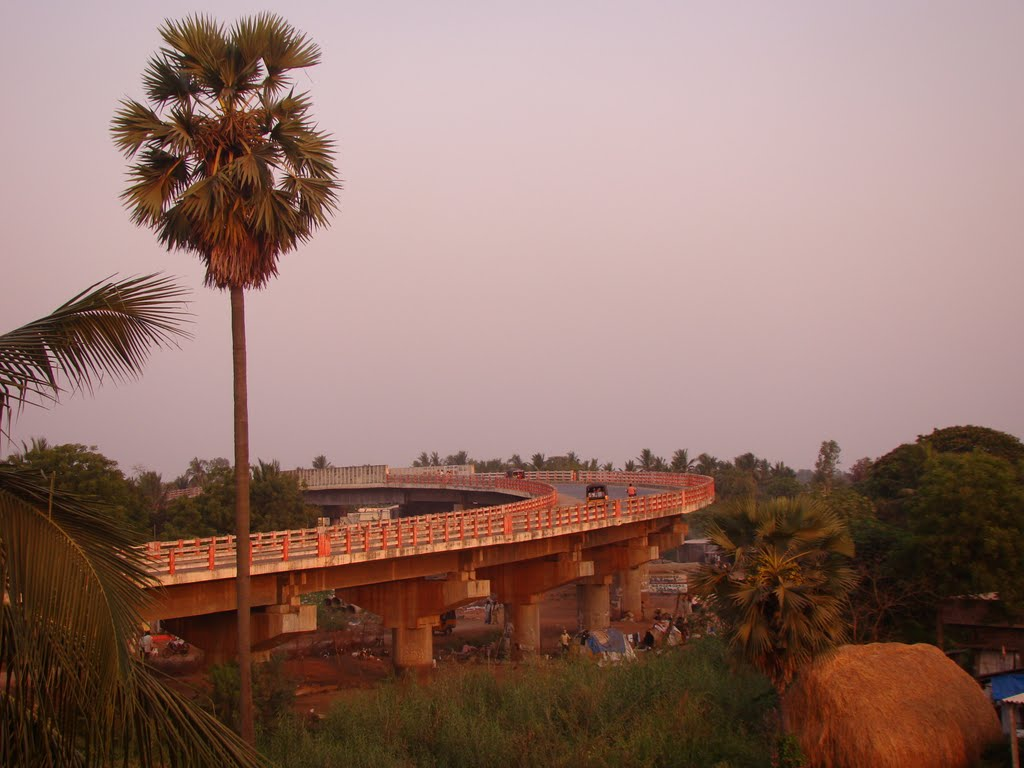
- Flyover of Pedavadlapudi
- Interactive map of Pedavadlapudi
- Location in Andhra Pradesh, India
- Coordinates: 16°24′35.21″N 80°36′40.92″E
- Country: India
- State: Andhra Pradesh
- District: Guntur
- Mandal: Mangalagiri

Government
  - Type: Municipal Corporation
  - Body: Mangalagiri Tadepalle Municipal Corporation

Area
  - Total: 949 ha (2,350 acres)

Population (2011)
  - Total: 13,076
  - Density: 1,380/km^{2} (3,570/sq mi)

Languages
  - Official: Telugu
- Time zone: UTC+5:30 (IST)
- PIN: 522302
- Area code: +91–8645
- Vehicle registration: AP07, AP39

Pedavadlapudi is a village in Guntur district of the Indian state of Andhra Pradesh. It is in Mangalagiri mandal. It is part of Mangalagiri Tadepalle Municipal Corporation It is part of Guntur revenue division.

== Geography ==
Pedavadlapudi is situated to the southeast of the mandal headquarters, Mangalagiri, at 16°24′35.21″N 80°36′40.92″E. It is spread over an area of 949 ha (2,350 acres).

== Demographics ==
As of 2011 Census of India, the town had a population of 13,076, with 3655 households. The total population constitute, 6,552 males and females 6,524 —a sex ratio of 996 females per 1000 males. and 1,090 children, in the age group of 0–6 years, of which 535 are boys and 555 are girls. The average literacy rate stands at 73.63% with 8,585 literates, approximately equal to the state average of 67.41%.

=== Language and religion ===
About 70% are Hindus and 30% are Muslims and Christians. The official language in this village is Telugu. Other minor language is Urdu. English is used as medium language in education here.

Religion in Pedavadlapudi
Hinduism	78%
Islam	13%
Christianity	8%
Others	1%

== Governance ==
Pedavadlapudi gram panchayat is the local self-government of the village. It is divided into wards and each ward is represented by a ward member. Pedavadlapudi is a part of Mangalagiri assembly constituency of Andhra Pradesh. The village forms a part of Andhra Pradesh Capital Region and is under the jurisdiction of APCRDA. The present MLA of the constituency is Nara Lokesh of Telugu Desam Party.

After June 2021. Pedavadlapudi was merged into Mangalagiri to form Mangalagiri Tadepalle Municipal Corporation under which the village is divided into three Wards. Elections have to be held here in December 2021 as reports

== Economy ==
Agriculture is the main occupation of the village. Hindustan Coca-Cola Beverages Private Limited, a bottling entity of Coca-Cola India is situated in the village. For trading and exporting of agricultural products, there exists an Agricultural Market Yard.

== Transport ==
Tenali–Mangalagiri road passes through Pedavadlapudi and the APSRTC buses which operates from Tenali bus station to Manglagiri bus station and Vijayawada, passes through the village. Pedavadlapudi railway station is administered under Vijayawada railway division of South Coast Railway zone and is situated on the mutual line of Howrah-Chennai and New Delhi–Chennai main lines. A new third line was proposed and sanctioned which passes through this village and a new station building also was sanctioned here. A new station building and new platforms are being built in this station to upgrade it Vijayawada International Airport is about 30 km from this village. A new outer ring road was sanctioned which passes through this village border.

== Education ==
As per the school information report for the academic year 2018–19, the village has a total of 14 schools. These include 8 Zilla Parishad/MPP and 6 private schools.

Almost the village's literacy rate crosses 65%. A junior college is situated in the village

== See also ==
- List of villages in Guntur district
