= Pemmasani =

Pemmasani may refer to:

- Pemmasani Ramalinga Nayudu I, member of the Pemmasani Nayak clan in the 15th century Vijayanagara Empire in southern India
- Pemmasani Timmanayudu I, progenitor of the Pemmasani Nayaks, as per the kaifiyat of Tadipatri
- Pemmasani Timmanayudu II, member of the Pemmasani Nayaks
- Pemmasani Ramalinga Nayudu, army commander of a Vijayanagara military unit
- Pemmasani Erra Timmanayudu, member of the Pemmasani Nayaks in the 16th century Vijayanagara Empire in South India

== See also ==
- Pemmasani Nayaks, ruling clan in the south Indian state of Andhra Pradesh
