= Duggirala =

- Village
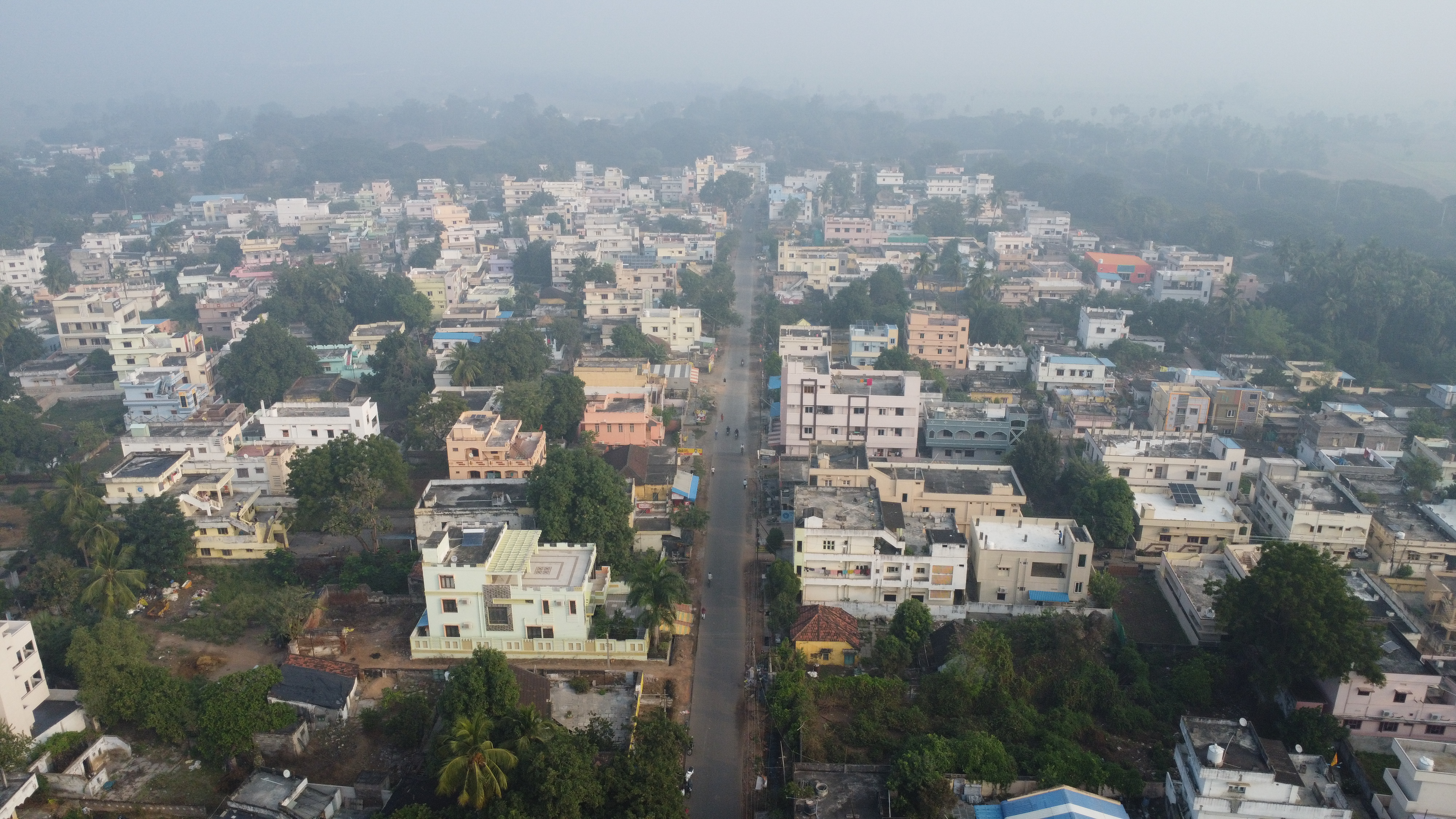
- Aerial view of Duggirala village
- Interactive map of Duggirala
- Location in Andhra Pradesh, India
- Coordinates: 16.3271°N 80.6280°E
- Country: India
- State: Andhra Pradesh
- District: Guntur
- Mandal: Duggirala

Government
  - Type: Panchayati raj
  - Body: Duggirala gram panchayat

Area
  - Total: 805 ha (1,990 acres)

Population (2011)
  - Total: 11,098
  - Density: 1,380/km^{2} (3,570/sq mi)

Languages
  - Official: Telugu
- Time zone: UTC+5:30 (IST)
- PIN: 522330
- Area code: +91–8644
- Vehicle registration: AP

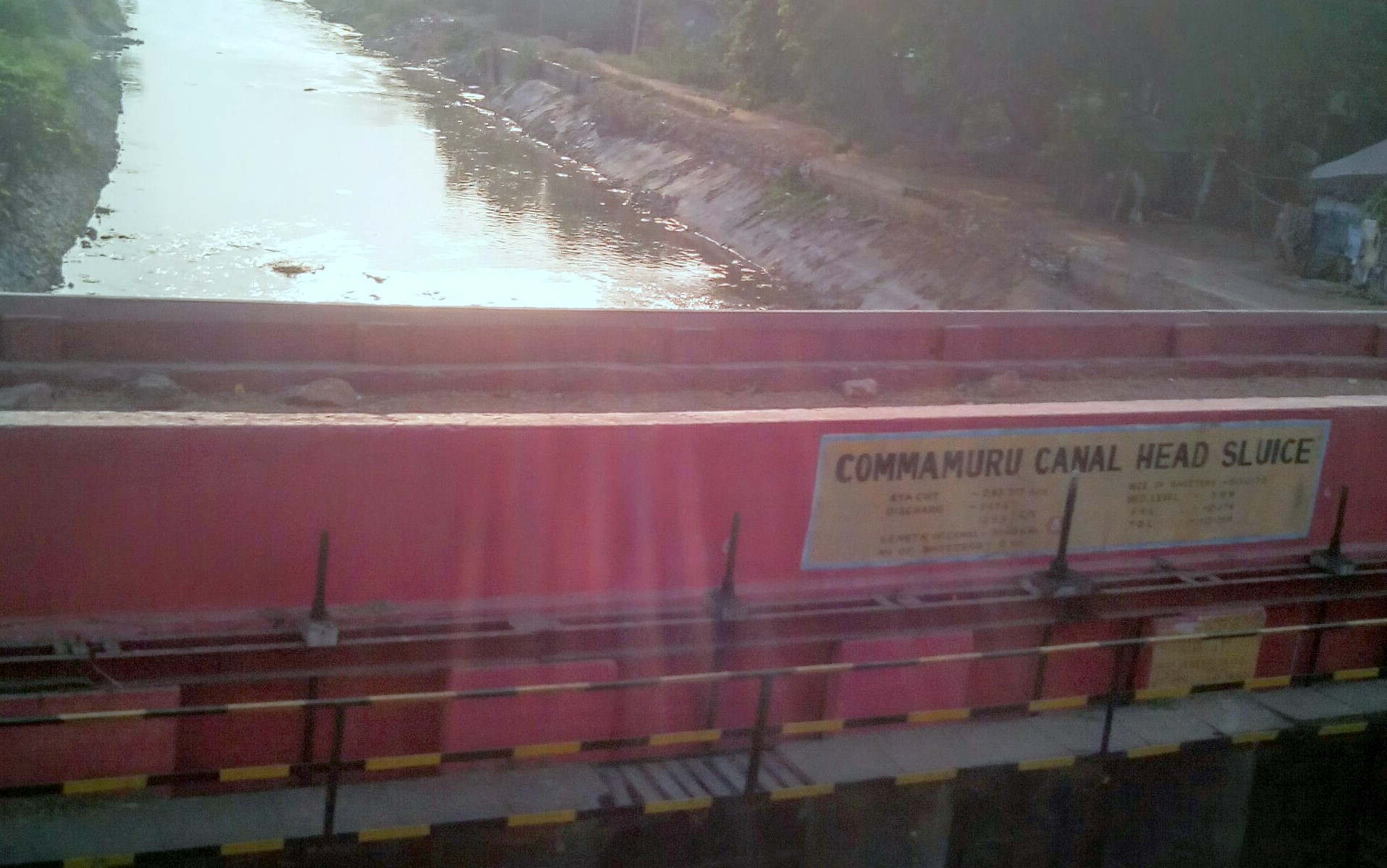
Kommamuru canal head sluice

Duggirala is a village in Guntur district of the Indian state of Andhra Pradesh. It is the mandal headquarters of Duggirala mandal in Tenali revenue division. It is one of the major turmeric trading centres in the country.

== History ==
The Chola dynasty has its presence in the area during 12th century AD, based on the inscriptions on the temple of Kesavaswami in the village.

== Geography ==
Duggirala is located at 16.3271°N 80.6280°E. It is spread over an area of 805 ha (1,990 acres). A canal from Sitanagaram (Tadepalle) passes through the village, which draws water from the Krishna River and forms a part of Western Delta system. It also houses the headlocks of Kommamuru and Nizampatnam canals.

== Demographics ==
As of 2011 census of India, the village had a population of 11,098 with 3,128 households. The total population constitute 5,505 males, 5,593 females and 1,053 children (age group of 0–6 years). With 7,709 literates, the average literacy rate is 76.75%. There are 4,860 employees and 6,238 non-employees. The working population constitute 3,932 main and 928 marginal workers.

== Government and politics ==
Duggirala gram panchayat is the local self-government of the village. It is divided into wards and each ward is represented by a ward member. The village is also the headquarters for Executive Engineer of Krishna Western Delta system. The village forms a part of Andhra Pradesh Capital Region and is under the jurisdiction of APCRDA.

Duggirala is a part of Mangalagiri assembly constituency of Andhra Pradesh. The present MLA of the constituency is Nara Lokesh of Telugu Desam Party.

== Economy ==
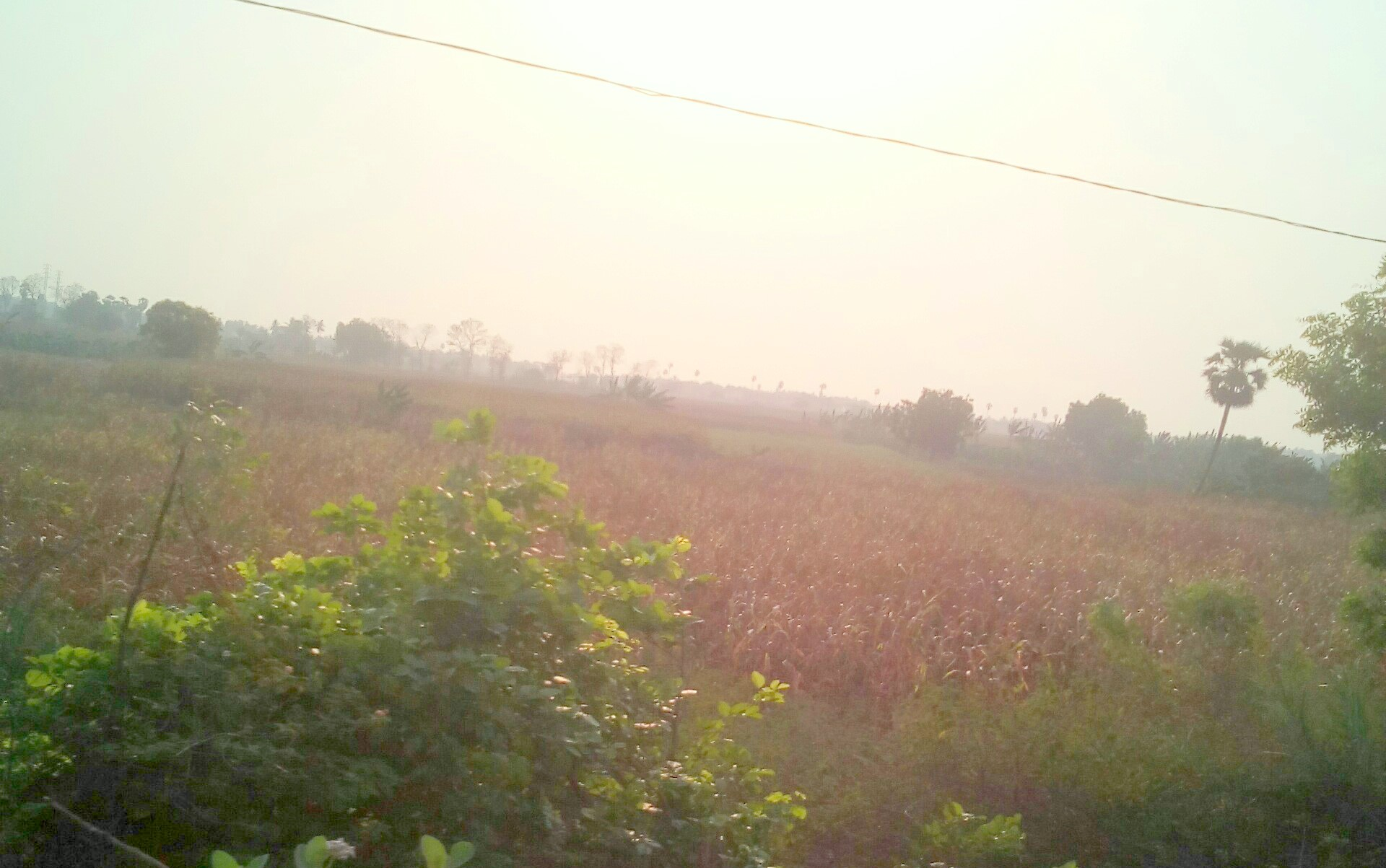
Agricultural fields at Duggirala

Agriculture

Duggirala Agriculture Marketyard in the village is used for trading and exporting of agricultural commodities. The major crops cultivated include paddy, turmeric etc. Duggirala Turmeric Yard is the largest yard in the state, handling more than 30,000 bags of turmeric. It produces 10% of the total turmeric produced in the country and is exported to countries like Russia, United States, UK and Japan.

Industries

CCL Products (India) Limited has an instant coffee manufacturing plant at Duggirala. CCL Products (India) Limited, a listed public company limited by shares was founded in the year 1994 with the vision of creating only the finest and the richest coffee in the world.

== Transport ==
Local transport include, city bus services operated by APSRTC from Tenali bus station to Mangalagiri and Vijayawada. Tenali–Mangalagiri road passes through Duggirala. Rural roads connects the village with Chintalapudi, Emani, K.R.Konduru, Manchikalapudi, Morampudi, Namburu, Penumuli and Pedapalem.

== Education ==
As per the school information report for the academic year 2018–19, the village has a total of 15 schools. These schools include 6 private and 9 Zilla/Mandal Parishad schools. Zilla Parishad High School in the village is the oldest school. It was established in the year 1912 and was then known as Sir George V Government Memorial Boarding School.

== See also ==
- List of villages in Guntur district
