= Tummala Seetharama Murthy =

Indian poet

Tummala Seetharama Murthy Choudary
- తుమ్మల సీతారామమూర్తి
- Born: 25 December 1901; Kavuru, Cherukupalle Guntur District, Andhra Pradesh India.
- Died: 21 March 1990 (aged 88); Appikatla, Guntur district, India.
- Occupations: Teacher, poet
- Writing career
- Genres: Romanticism, Humanistic, Nationalistic

Tummala Seetharama Murthy or Tummla Seetharama Murthy Choudary (1901–1990) was an Indian poet writing in Telugu.

Murthy was born in Kavuru village in the Guntur district of Andhra Pradesh. Works such as "Rashtragaanamu" reflect patriotism and the Indian independence struggle. He was honoured with the Sahitya Akademi Award in 1969 and with the title "Kalaaprapoorna" by Andhra University in 1969.

== Introduction ==
Sri Tummala Sitaramamurthy was a major contributor to 20th century Telugu literature. He was one of the most prominent poets in the history of the modern Telugu literature. Born in an age of national fight for freedom, he completely came under the influence of Mahatma Gandhi. The other personalities that inspired him were Acharya N.G. Ranga, the father of the world peasant movement, Kaviraju Sri Tripuraneni Ramaswamy Chowdhary who was the father of the revolutionary poetry in Telugu literature, and Mahakavi Sri Chellapilla Venkata Sastry who brought Telugu poem from royal palaces to common people in the society. Also the philosophies of social reformers of Vemana, Potuluri Veerabhramam, Kandukuri Veeresalingam, Kabir, Nanak, Raja Ramamohana Roy, Dayananda Saraswathi and others had immense effect on the poet. Inspired by these personalities, he produced a literature to promote human values in the society. He wanted to make man cultured and the society progressive through his literature. Telugu is the second-largest living language in India. He was an unacknowledged laureate of the Andhras.

== Early life ==
Sitaramamurthy was born in a family of land cultivators. He was born on 25 December 1901, at Kavoor, a hamlet in Repalle Taluq of Krishna district (later divided into Guntur and Krishna), in the presidency of Madras (later divided into Andhra Pradesh and Tamil Nadu). His parents Narayya and Chenchamma were middle class farmers. His place of birth was visited by personalities like Mahatma Gandhi, Vinoba Bave and Babu Rajendra Prasad. Sitaramamurthy struggled for his education. During the daytime he assisted his father in agriculture and in the night he learned Telugu and Sanskrit under teachers and scholars living in the neighboring villages.

== Education ==
He went to Chittigudur near Bandar (now Machilipatnam), which was a center for learning in the district to study Ubhayabasha Praveena. Sri G Varadacharyulu was the founder and also the principal of this institution. He was not only an teacher but also a patriot. Here he learned Telugu grammar from Sri Duvvuri Venkata Ramana Sastry who was a scholar. Finally, he passed the public examinations in first division and then secured a job as a Telugu pandit in 1930. He worked in the schools of Duggirala, Bapatla, Nidubrolu and Appikatla. He retired from the service in 1957 at Appikatla. His early literacy works brought him recognition as a poet.

== Literary ideals ==
The modern age has brought a change in the outlook, philosophy and ideals of literature. Literature has come nearer to human life, its problems and its solutions. The puranic (mythological) themes have given way to human life in literature. For him revolution does not need bloodshed; it only means 'change'. He believes that the change in the society should come through the Gandhian way or the Sarvodaya Path. The change that comes through the revolution will be temporary and the change that comes through the Sarvodaya Path will remain permanent.

He had a message and philosophy to the society.

Love of the nation, Love of the state, Love of mankind have constituted his poetic philosophy. The scope of his poetry was universal. In his opinion, he made the goal of his poetry as a great inspiring force for the political, social, religious, economic and moral movements of his age. For him, literature was a means to serve humanity and inspire people to live in a noble path. The achievement of independence to the country, individual freedom, social equality, religious harmony, economic progress, moral and cultural advancement in the society were his literary ideals. "The grief of the people is the anguish of Sitaramamurthy", so the themes of his works were problems faced by people time to time and their solutions. Thus his literature ostensibly to reflects all classes of people.

== Early life and education ==
Sri Tummala Seetharama Murthy garu was born in Kavuru village in Cherukupalli Mandal of Guntur district, Andhra Pradesh. He was born on 1 December 1901 to Tummala Narayya and Chenchamamba. He completed his Ubhya Bhasha Praveena From Andhra University. He spent most of his career working as a teacher. He taught Sanskrit for some time in Sanskrit School, Amrutaluru. He died on 21 March 1990 in Appikatla village of Guntur District.

== Poetic style and works ==
He was initially interested in Bhava Kavitha Udyayam (Romanti Poetry), later he got inspired in to Humanism, and then finally into nationalism and struggle for Indian independence. Later he worked towards special Andhra state and Sarvodaya Movement as well. All these phases gets reflected in works. Tummala SitaRama Murthy advocated Gandhian philosophy. He strived to write poetry in simple language free from complex Sanskrit. His literary works include

- "Rastra Ganamu" - Praising the history and glory of Rayalaseema
- "Mahatma Katha" - The independence movement and nationalism were popularised with Mahatma Gandhi as protagonist in his novel.
- "Sarvodaya Ganamau" - About Sarvodaya movement
- "Pariga Panta"
- "Paira Panta"
- "Atmarpanamu"

He is credited for writing around 30 works.

== Accolades and recognition ==
- Sahitya Akademi Award in Telugu, in 1969 for his Poetry - Mahatma Katha
- Kalaprapoorna (Sahitya) title by Andhra University
- Abhinava Tikkana, Telugu lenka titles conferred by other organizations
