= Cherukupalle mandal =

Cherukupalli mandal
- Mandal
- Cherukupalle H/O Arumbaka
- Interactive map of Cherukupalli mandal
- Location in Andhra Pradesh, India Cherukupalli mandal (India)
- Coordinates: 16.04825°N 80.67561°E
- Country: India
- State: Andhra Pradesh
- District: Bapatla
- Mandal: Cherukupalli
- Established: 25 May 1985

Area
  - Total: 98.97 km^{2} (38.21 sq mi)
- Elevation: 9 m (30 ft)

Population (2011)
  - Total: 60,385
  - Density: 610.1/km^{2} (1,580/sq mi)

Languages
  - Official: Telugu
- Time zone: UTC+5:30 (IST)
- PIN: 522 309
- Telephone code: 08648

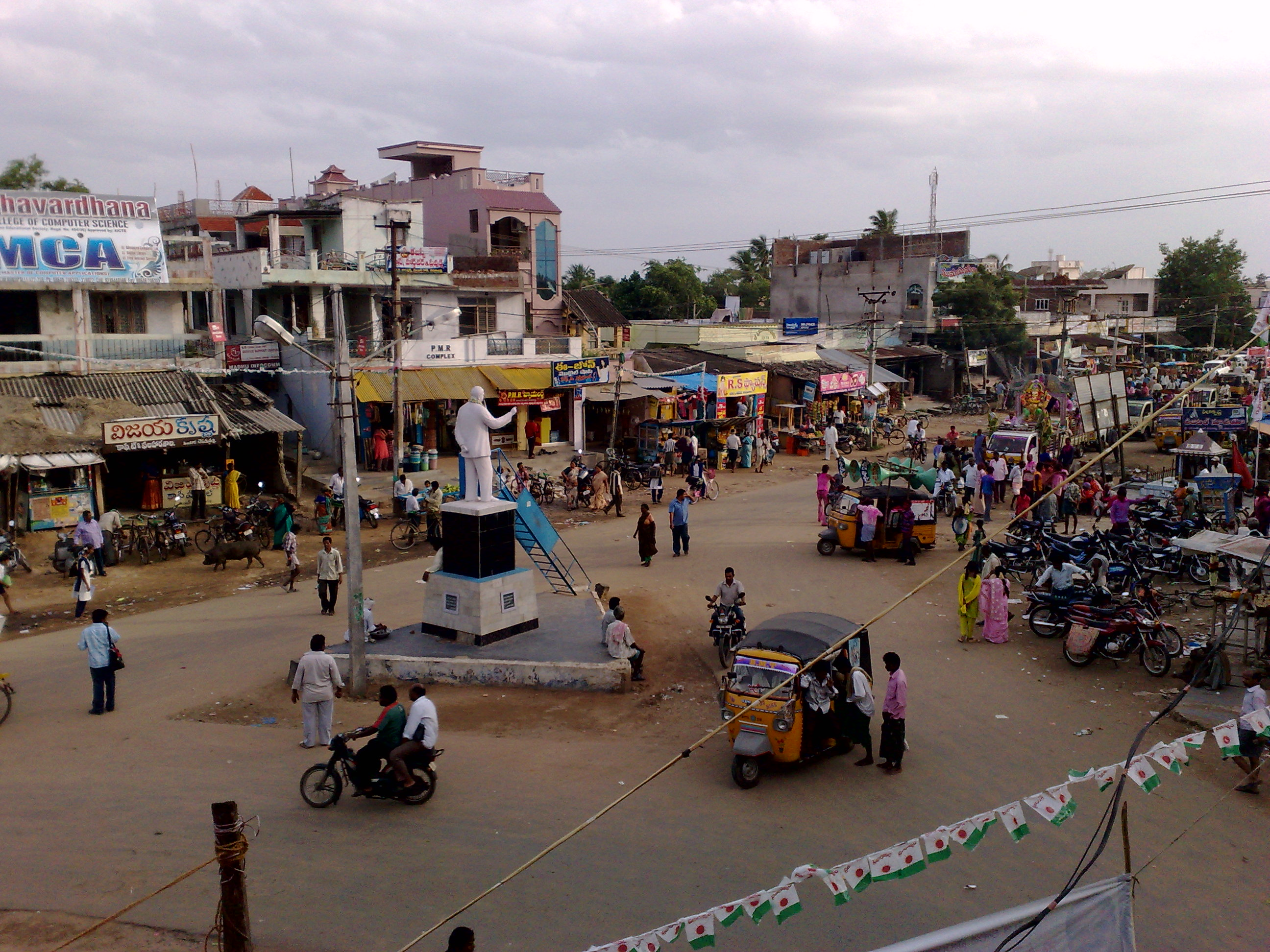
Cherukupalli Centre

Cherukupalli mandal is one of the fifty seven mandals in Bapatla district of the Indian state of Andhra Pradesh. It is under the administration of Repalle revenue division of the district. The village of Cherukupalli is the administrative seat of the mandal.

== History ==
This area may be under Kingdom of Prataliputra (5th century BC), identified with Bhattiprolu (10 km away), the earliest known kingdom in Guntur District. Inscriptional evidence shows that king Kubera was ruling over Bhattiprolu around 230 BC followed by the Sala Kings. This area used to be under Nizampatnam Circar during Golconda Sultanate and Nizam times. Nizampatnam circar was transferred to French and then on to British for the help rendered during the Carnatic wars.

The Arumbaka copper plates of Badapa (AD 970–999) mentions that the village of Arumbaka having its boundaries as Kavuru, Cherukumballi (Cherukupalli), Gomaduvu (Govada) and Sripundi (Sripudi )was given by Chalukyan Kings to certain Gandanarayana, famous archer

The village of Arepalli was granted as Inam in the year 1688 (Salivahana era 1610) by Rajas of Komaravole, residents of Nizampatnam to certain Brahmins for religious purposes. "A manual of Krishna District: Madras Presidency" compiled in the year 1881–82 also mentions the villages Ponnapalli and Arepalli as inam villages and the present area under Repalli Taluka. The Cherukupalli Sub-District (Sub-Registrar) was formed in 1911 by removing some villages from Repalle, Bapatla and Guntur Taluks. The present sub-registrar office was constructed between 1926 and 1929 This area also finds mention in civil dispute case regarding Chennakesawara Swamy temple near cherukupalli in 1926 All India reporter

During freedom struggle, Nehru Granthalayam (library) was established in Gudavalli village as part of library movement to educate the people. Mahatma Gandhi visited the mandal on 23 December 1933 as part of harijan upliftment tour. He laid foundation for Vinayashram building in Kavuru village, opened temple for harijans and gave a short speech. A tree planted by Gandhiji in 1933 is still alive in this ashramam. Gandhiji again visited Vinayashram on 23 January 1937 during his tour of cyclone affected areas of coastal Andhra. Another ashramam (Maitreya Ashramam) to his memory was established in Gudavalli village and functions till date.

Katragadda Varadarajullu built school in his own land in inturu(ఇంటూరు), Amruthalur mandal even Mahatma Gandhi visited this school in inturu which was later taken control by government and named it as Katragadda zilla parishad high school, drinking water wells were built by him for welfare of people, He donated his own land for people to use for graveyard purposes in 4 villages as there are no graveyards in Inturu, Rambhotlapallem, Tummalapalem surrounding areas. Katragadda Varadarajullu has also given his own 35 acres of agricultural land for 99 years lease to vinayashram through his relative Jagarlamudi Kuppuswamy Chowdary in 1933.

Sri Gollapudi Sita Rama Shastri (Swami Sitaram), a gandhian was instrumental in establishing Vinaya Ashram (now Krishi Vignana Kendra) in Kavuru Village. During Quit India movement, he led a group of people who set fire to Sub Registrar office at Cherukupalli. He also undertook fast unto death for creation of separate Andhra state from his ashram at Kavuru, but gave up his 35-day fast under the advice from Vinobha Bhave. On 29 May 1975 a group of naxalites attacked Cherukupalli police station and decamped with police weapons – a first in the state's history. This gave jolt to the police, who until then considered naxalites were confined only to the forests.

== Geography ==
The mandal is bounded by Nagaram mandal towards south, Amruthalur mandal towards north, Pittalavanipalem mandal towards south, Bhattiprolu mandal towards east.

Climate

The mandal receives rainfall from South-West monsoon in the months of June-Sept. The average annual rainfall is 875 mm.

Rainfall in Cherukupalle mandal
Average rainfall (mm)	Actual Rainfall (mm)		
Average rainfall (mm)	2010	2011	2012
875.0	1389.6	457.6	973.4

The average monthly rainfall in mandal is as follows

Average monthly rainfall in Cherukupalle mandal
Month	January	February	March	April	May	June	July	August	September	October	November	December
Average rainfall (mm)	13.1	8.4	3.7	6.4	62.7	85.7	127.9	138.3	157.0	143.0	102.2	26.6

== Demographics ==
As of 2011 census, the mandal had a population of 60,385. The total population constitute, 29,852 males and 30,533 females —a sex ratio of 1024 females per 1000 males. 5,371 children are in the age group of 0–6 years, of which 2,748 are boys and 2,623 are girls. The average literacy rate stands at 66.88% with 36,795 literates.

== Government and politics ==
=== Administration ===
The mandal consist 10 revenue villages, 16 panchayats and 49 hamlets.

The area used to be part of Tenali Taluka and later came under newly formed Repalle Taluka from 1909. Again in 1981–82 this mandal came under Pallapatla taluka after bifurcation of Repalle Taluka. Cherukupalli mandal came into existence from 25-5-1985 as per government decision to form new administrative units called mandals. The settlements in the mandal are listed below:

1. Arepalli
2. Arumbaka†
3. Balusupalem
4. Gudavalli
5. Kavuru
6. Kanagala
7. Nadimpalli
8. Ponnapalli
9. Rajavolu
10. Rambhotlapalem

†−Mandal headquarters

=== Politics ===
Cherukupalli mandal falls under Bapatla Parliamentary constituency, represented by Krishna Prasad Tenneti of the Telugu Desam Party. It in turn also a pivotal part of Repalle assembly constituency, represented by Anagani Satya Prasad from the Telugu Desam Party . The mandal administration is under the Cherukupalli Mandal Parishad, a local self-government, established under AP Panchayati Raj act, 1994. The present Mandal Parishad president is MATHI DIWAKAR RATHANA PRASAD of YSRCP In the local government elections held in 2019, M.PAVANI won from Cherukupalli ZPTC (ZIlla Parishad Territorial Constituency).

The list of Mandal Parishad members elected in 2014 elections are as below.

S.No.	Constituency	Reservation	MPTC Member	Political Party
1	Arepalli	UR(W)	Mathi Vijaya Lakshmi	YSRCP
2	Arumbaka	SC	Vemu Mohanbabu	Telugu Desam Party
3	Balusulapalem	UR	Yarramsetty Venkata Srinivasa Rao	Telugu Desam Party
4	Cherukupalli-1	SC(W)	Naidu Padma	Telugu Desam Party
5	Cherukupalli-2	UR(W)	Mokhamatam Parvathi	Telugu Desam Party
6	Gudavalli	UR	Gaddipati Venkateswara Rao	Telugu Desam Party
7	Gullapalli-1	ST(W)	Savanam Padma	Telugu Desam Party
8	Gullapalli-2	BC	Yaragalla Amareswari	Telugu Desam Party
9	Kanagala-1	UR	Abdul Ahad	YSRCP
10	Kanagala-2	UR(W)	Dhoopam Samrajyam	Telugu Desam Party
11	Kavuru	BC(W)	Yalavarthi Tirumala Rani	Telugu Desam Party
12	Nadimpalli	UR(W)	Uppala Swetha	Telugu Desam Party
13	Ponnapalli	BC(W)	Puli Vijaya Lakshmi	YSRCP
14	Rajavolu	UR(W)	Dontuboina Samrajyam	YSRCP
15	Rambhotlapalem	BC	Janni Sambasiva Rao	YSRCP
16	Thurpupalem	UR	Pushadapu Venkata Srinivasa Rao	YSRCP
17	Tummalapalem	UR	Akkala Venkata Krishna Reddy	YSRCP

The below table lists all the presidents elected for mandal parishad.

Election Years	Mandal Parishad President	Political Party
2001	Pushadapu Siva Ganga Parvathy	CONGRESS INC
2006	Chennu Koteswara Rao	INC
2014	M.Parvathi	Telugu Desam Party

== Economy ==
Mother Teressa Swachanda Seva Samstha at Cherukupalle and Sharon International Ministries at Kurrapalem, Gullapalli village are the only two NGOs in the mandal are cleared to receive foreign donations under Foreign Contribution Regulation Act (FCRA).

Three Primary Agricultural Credit Co-operative Societies (PACS) are active in the mandal at Kavuru, Gudavalli, Nadimpalli. Milk Producers MACS (Nadimpalli, Cherukupalli, Vuchavaripalem, Pooshadapuvaripalem, Podilivaripalem, Ponnapalli, Balusulapalem, Gullapalli, Arepalli, Rajavolu, Kanagala, Gudavalli, Kaminenivaripalem, Yeminenivaripalem); Mutually Aided Coop.Thrift Village Societies (MACTVS) in all the villages the mandal; Cherukupalli Santhi Sree Mandal Women MATC Federation Ltd; Pagadavaripalem Mahila TMACPS; Pittukotireddypalem Mahila TMACPS are some of the other.

== Education ==
66 Anganwadi Centres (AWC) operate in the mandal providing nutrition and pre-school education. The mandal has some of the oldest and famous govt schools like Sri Jagannadha Aided upper primary school, Kanagala established in 1929, Muniwamy Nadiu ZP school, Gudavalli established in 1944, Cherukupalli ZPH school, Kavuru ZPH school. A Govt BC Boys welfare hostel is located at Gullapalli. Apart from this 1 SC boys hostel and 1 SC girls hostel also operate in the mandal. Kavuru govt junior college, Nagarjuna Junior College at Cherukupalle and Cherukupalle Junior College are the notable junior colleges in the mandal.
