= Intur =

Intur ఇంటూరు
- Village
- Interactive map of Intur
- Location in Andhra Pradesh, India Intur (India)
- Coordinates: 16°03′44.391″N 80°37′36.385″E
- Country: India
- State: Andhra Pradesh
- District: Bapatla
- Mandal: Intur
- Founder: Government of Andhra Pradesh
- Named for: Agriculture

Government
  - Type: Parliamentary System
  - Body: Government of Andhra Pradesh

Languages
  - Official: Telugu
- Time zone: UTC+5:30 (IST)
- Postal code: 522341
- Telephone code: +91–8644
- Vehicle registration: AP-07, 39, 40

Intur is a village or gram panchayat in Amruthalur mandal of Bapatla district in the Andhra Pradesh state of India. It is located 10 km from the mandal headquarters Amruthalur and 8 km from the nearest town Ponnur. As per the 2011 Census of India, the village has a population of 5715 and a population of 1676 households spread over an area of 2184 hectares. The village has a male population of 2796 and a female population of 2919. The Scheduled Castes population is 2603 and the Scheduled Tribes population is 348. The village has a census location code of 590397.[1]. The STD code is 8644.

== Village history ==
Intur and Amruthalur were first ruled by the Katragadda Zamindars, especially under Rao Saheb Katragadda Pedda Achaiah Garu (1848-1890). Later his eldest son Katragadda Sriramulu Garu (1873-1906) ruled. After him his only son Katragadda Varadarajulu Garu (1896-1960) ruled until the abolition of the Zamindar system. Katragadda Varadarajulu Garu built a school on his own land in Intur and Amruthalur mandal. Mahatma Gandhi visited this school, which was later renamed as Katragadda Zilla Parishad High School under government control. He himself built water wells for the welfare of the people. He donated his land for cremation grounds in the surrounding areas of Intur, Rambhotlapallem and Tummalapallem, as there were no crematoriums in those areas. On the advice of his relative Jagarlamudi Kuppuswami Chowdary, in 1933, Katragadda Varadarajulu leased 35 acres of land to Vinayashram for 99 years.

The government has issued orders separately identifying the mandals and villages coming under the jurisdiction of the Andhra Pradesh Capital Region Development Authority (CRDA). Most of the villages identified so far are under the VGTM. Some more villages have now been included in addition to those that were previously under the VGTM. The Principal Secretary of the Municipal Administration Department has issued orders identifying the mandals and villages in Guntur and Krishna districts that will come under the CRDA.

== Village geography ==
Nearby villages The villages near this village are Bodapadu , Yelavaru , Moparru , Rambhotlavaripalem and Turumella .

== Educational facilities ==
There are six government primary schools, two private primary schools, one government upper primary school and one government secondary school in the village. The nearest nursery school is in Amruthalur . The nearest junior college, government arts/science degree college and engineering college are in Ponnur. The nearest medical college is in Guntur, management college and polytechnics are also in Ponnur. The nearest vocational training school, informal education centre are in Ponnur and a special school for the disabled is also in Guntur .

== Information and transportation facilities ==
There is a sub post office facility in Intur. Post office facility, Post and Telegraph Office are 5 to 10 km. away from the village. Landline telephone, public phone office, mobile phone etc. facilities are available. Internet cafe / common service center, private courier are 5 to 10 km. away from the village. Government transport buses ply from nearby areas to the village. Auto facility is also available from nearby villages. There are tractors in the village for use in agriculture. Private bus facility is 5 to 10 km. away from the village. Railway station is more than 10 km. away from the village. Main district highway, district highway pass through the village. National highway is 5 to 10 km. away from the village. State highway is more than 10 km. away from the village. There are tarred roads, gravel roads and dirt roads in the village.

== Health, nutrition, and recreational facilities ==
The village has an Anganwadi center, other nutrition centers, and an ASHA worker. The village has a library and a public reading room. Newspaper distribution is done in the village. There is an assembly polling station and a birth and death registration office. An integrated child development scheme and a playground are 5 to 10 km. away from the village. A cinema hall is 5 to 10 km. away from the village.

== Statistics ==
According to the 2001 census, the village population is 5998. Out of this, 2951 are males and 3047 are females. There are 1718 residential houses in the village. The area of the village is 2184 hectares.
