= Appapuram =

Appapuram may refer to:

- Appapuram, Kakumanu mandal, a village in Andhra Pradesh, India
- Appapuram, Nadendla mandal, a village in Andhra Pradesh, India
