= Repalle =

Town in Bapatla (Andhra Pradesh), India

- Town
- Repalle railway station sign board

- Location in Andhra Pradesh, India
- Coordinates: 16°01′02″N 80°49′46″E
- Country: India
- State: Andhra Pradesh
- District: Bapatla
- Mandal: Repalle

Government
  - Body: Repalle Municipality; APCRDA
  - MLA: Anagani Satya Prasad (Telugu Desam Party)
  - Municipal commissioner: Buddha Rama Satya Seshadri

Area
  - Total: 10.97 km^{2} (4.24 sq mi)
  - Rank: 23rd
- Elevation: 10 m (33 ft)

Population (2011)
  - Total: 50,866
  - Density: 4,637/km^{2} (12,010/sq mi)

Languages
  - Official: Telugu
- Time zone: UTC+5:30 (IST)
- PIN: 522265
- Telephone code: +91–8648
- Vehicle registration: AP–39
- Lok Sabha constituency: Bapatla (SC)
- Assembly constituency: Repalle
- Website: repalle.cdma.ap.gov.in/en

Repalle is a town in Bapatla district of the Indian state of Andhra Pradesh. The town is one of the 12 municipalities in Bapatla district and the headquarters of Repalle mandal under the administration of Repalle revenue division. It is situated near the Krishna River in the Coastal Andhra region of the state.

== History ==
The name Repalle is actually formed from two words: Revu (river or bank of the river) and Palle (village). Originally known as Revupalle, the name has evolved to Repalle over time.

== Geography ==
Repalle is located at 16.01°N 80.51°E. It has an average elevation of 7 m (23 ft) and situated 10.62 km (6.60 mi). The nearest towns are Tenali in the Bapatla district, Ponnur, Bapatla in the Bapatla District and Machilipatnam in the Krishna district.

== Climate ==
Repalle is situated 25 kilometres (16 mi) from the sea coast. It is typically hot and humid during summer, with temperatures ranging between 28° and 42 °C on average. Winters are milder with temperatures between 15° and 30 °C on average. Heavy rains are common between July and November during the monsoon season.

== Demographics ==
As of 2011 census, the town had a population of 50,866. The total population constitute, 24,385 males and 26,481 females —a sex ratio of 1086 females per 1000 males. 4,308 children are in the age group of 0–6 years, of which 2,184 are boys and 2,124 are girls. The average literacy rate stands at 81.32% with 37,862 literates, significantly higher than the state average of 67.41%.

== Government and politics ==
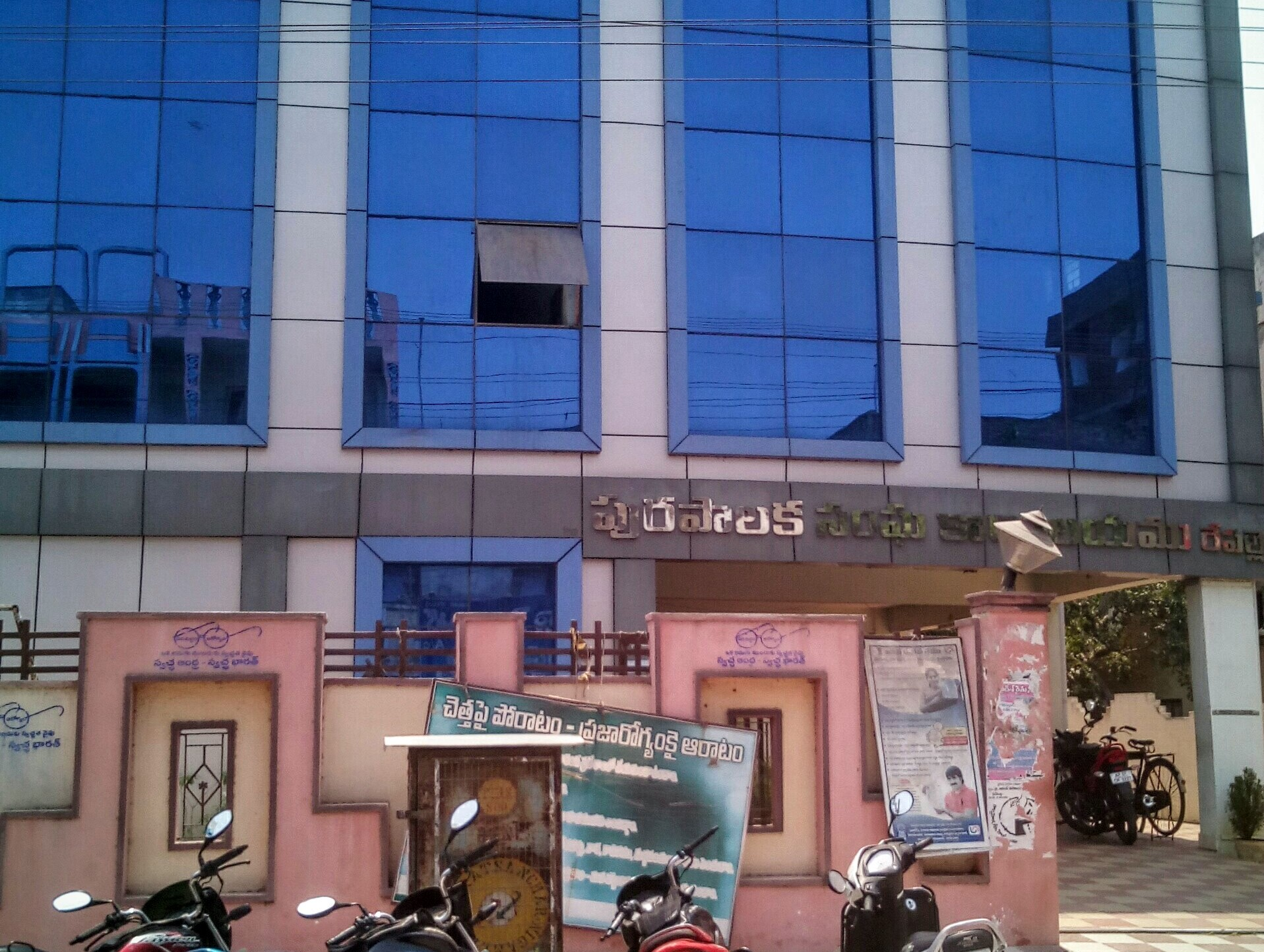
Repalle Municipality building

=== Civic administration ===
Repalle Municipality is a second grade municipality, which was established in the year 1965. It is spread over an area of 10.97 km^{2} (4.24 sq mi). It has 28 wards with an extent of 10.97 km^{2} (4.24 mi^{2}). The present Municipal Commissioner of the town is Vijaya Saradhi. The present Municipal Chairperson of the town is smt.Katta Manga of Yscrp. The municipal department maintains amenities such as public taps, public bore-wells, drains, roads, street lights, public parks etc. Others include dispensaries, elementary and secondary schools etc.

=== Politics ===
Repalle is a part of the Repalle Assembly constituency for Andhra Pradesh Legislative Assembly. Anagani Satya Prasad is the present MLA of the constituency from the Telugu Desam Party. The assembly segment in turn is a part of Bapatla (SC) Lok Sabha constituency, which was won by Nandigam Suresh of the Yuvajana Sramika Raithu Congress Party (YSRCP).

== Notable people ==
- K. Viswanath, a film director
- S. Janaki, playback singer
- Samudrala Sr., screenwriter
- C. V. S. K. Sarma, economist and a retired IAS officer
- V. Nagayya, actor

== Transport ==
Repalle bus station

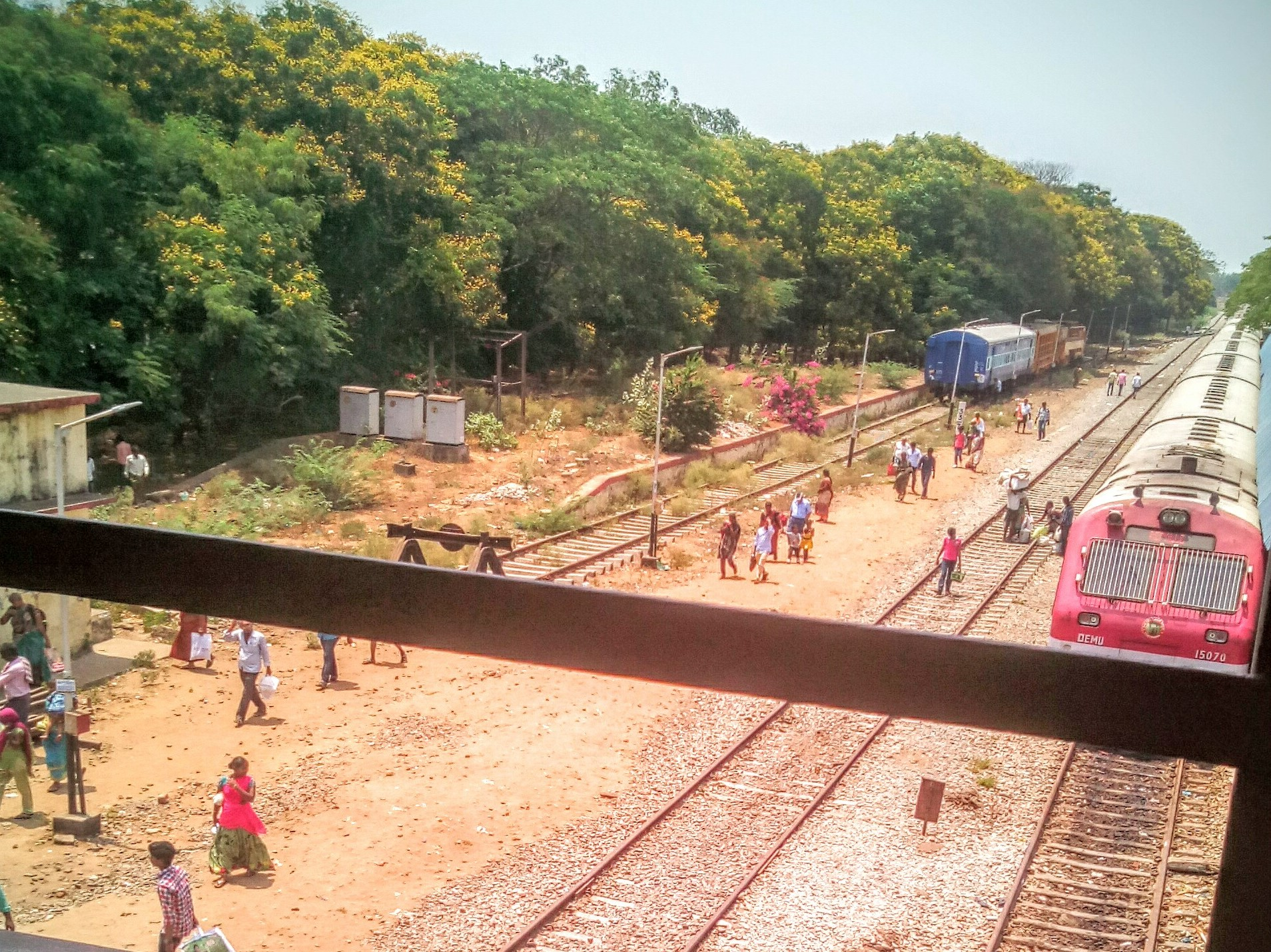
Repalle railway station overview

The town has a total road length of 115.10 km (71.52 mi). The Repalle bus station is owned and operated by APSRTC. The bus station is also equipped with a bus depot for storage and maintenance of buses. The National Highway 216 passes by the village Penumudi near to Repalle, which connects Digamarru and Ongole. Repalle is a B–category terminus station on the Tenali–Repalle branch line of Guntur railway division.

== Education ==
The primary and secondary school education is imparted by government, aided and private schools, under the School Education Department of the state. The medium of instruction followed by different schools is English and Telugu.

== See also ==
- Villages in Repalle mandal
