= Isukapalli =

- village
- Interactive map of Isukapalli
- Country: India
- State: Andhra Pradesh
- District: Bapatla

Languages
  - Official: Telugu
- Time zone: UTC+5:30 (IST)
- Vehicle registration: AP

Isukapalli is a village in Repalle mandal, Bapatla district of Andhra Pradesh, India.
