= Jonnavaripalem =

Village in Andhra Pradesh, India

Coordinates: 15°53′10.4″N 80°52′32.82″E

Jonnavaripalem is a small village in Repalle mandal, located on the banks of the River Krishna in the Bapatla district, Andhra Pradesh State, India.

== Geography ==
The climate is tropical, with hot summers and moderate winters. The average warmest month is May. On average, the coolest month is January. The maximum average precipitation occurs in August. The peak temperature reaches 39 °C (99 °F) in May–June, while the winter temperature is 19-28 C.
