= Mantripalem =

Village in Andhra Pradesh, India

- Interactive map of Mantripalem
- Location within India
- Coordinates: 15°57′43″N 80°44′56″E

Mantripalem is a village located 56 kilometers east from district headquarters and 335 kilometers from the state capital, Hyderabad in Nagaram Mandal, Bapatla district, Andhra Pradesh, India.

== Demographics ==
Mantripalem has a population of 4,065 (census 2020). It has a population density of 556 people per square kilometer. The gross population consists of 2,060 males and 2,005 females. The local language in Mantripalem is Telugu. Mantripalem is surrounded by Nizampatnam Mandal towards South, Cherukupalle Mandal towards west, Bhattiprolu Mandal towards North, Repalle Mandal towards East. Mantripalem's PIN code is 522262 and the postal headquarter office is Kuchinapudi. The area of Mantripalem is 7.3 square kilometers.
