= Rajukalva =

Rajukalva రాజుకాలవ
- Village
- Interactive map of Rajukalva
- Coordinates: 15°51′28″N 80°52′28″E
- Country: India
- State: Andhra Pradesh
- District: Bapatla
- Mandal: Repalle

Government
  - Type: Sarpanch

Rajukalva is a village situated at Repalle in Andhra Pradesh, India.
