= Peteru =

- Village
- Interactive map of Peteru
- Location in Andhra Pradesh, India
- Coordinates: 16°2′20″N 80°50′25″E
- Country: India
- State: Andhra Pradesh
- District: Bapatla
- Mandal: Repalle

Government
  - Type: Panchayati raj
  - Body: Peteru gram panchayat

Area
  - Village: 859 ha (2,120 acres)

Population (2011)
  - Village: 8,547
  - Density: 995/km^{2} (2,580/sq mi)
  - Rural: nearly 8,000 people

Languages
  - Official: Telugu
- Time zone: UTC+5:30 (IST)
- PIN: 522265
- Area code: +91–
- Vehicle registration: AP

Peteru is a village in Bapatla district of the Indian state of Andhra Pradesh. It is located in Repalle mandal of Repalle revenue division.

== Governance ==
Peteru gram panchayat is the local self-government of the village. It is divided into wards and each ward is represented by a ward member. The elected members of the gram panchayat is headed by a sarpanch.
