= Kanagala =

- Village
- Interactive map of Kanagala
- Location in Andhra Pradesh, India
- Coordinates: 16°04′48″N 80°44′19″E
- Country: India
- State: Andhra Pradesh
- District: Bapatla
- Mandal: Cherukupalle

Government
  - Type: Panchayati raj
  - Body: Kanagala gram panchayat

Area
  - Total: 1,249 ha (3,090 acres)

Population (2011)
  - Total: 7,192
  - Density: 575.8/km^{2} (1,491/sq mi)

Languages
  - Official: Telugu
- Time zone: UTC+5:30 (IST)
- PIN: 522259
- Area code: +91–8648
- Vehicle registration: AP

Kanagala is a village in Bapatla district of the Indian state of Andhra Pradesh. It is the located in Cherukupalle mandal of Repalle revenue division.

== Geography ==
Kanagala is situated to the northwest of the mandal headquarters, Arumbaka, at 16°04′48″N 80°44′19″E. It is spread over an area of 1,249 ha (3,090 acres). Piped Water Supply to the village from Vellaturu channel (functional).

== Demographics ==
As of 2011 census of India, the total number of households in the village are 7,192. It had a total population of 7,192, which includes 3,585 males, 3,607 females and 624 children in the age group of 0–6 years. The average literacy rate stands at 68.77% with 4,517 literates. There are a total of 2,970 workers, 538 marginal workers and 4,222 non–workers. The workers include 219 cultivators, 1,279 agricultural labourers, 172 working in household industries and 762 employed in other works.

== Government and politics ==
Kanagala gram panchayat is the local self-government of the village. It is divided into wards and each ward is represented by a ward member.

== Education ==
As per the school information report for the academic year 2018–19, the village has a total of 11 schools. These schools include 8 Mandal Parishad and 3 private schools.
