= Anasuya Devī =

Indian spiritual guru

Anasuya Devi
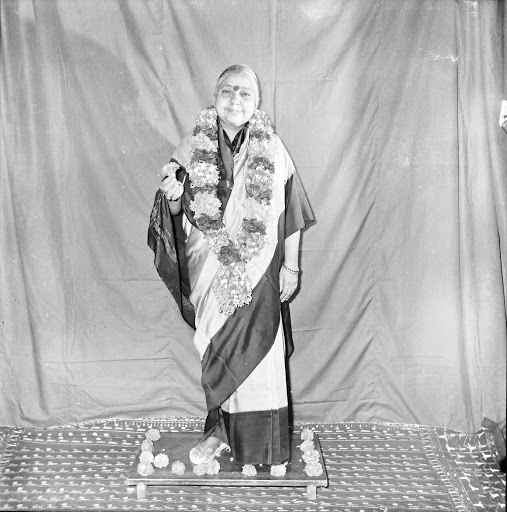

Personal life
- Born: Anasuya; 28 March 1923 Mannava, Mannava Panchayat, Guntur District, (now Andhra Pradesh), India
- Died: 12 June 1985 (aged 62) Jillellamudi, Andhra Pradesh, India

Religious life
- Religion: Hinduism

Quotation

"Mother exists forever and includes everything within herself. She who is everything and everywhere is Mother. It is not correct to say Mother of the Universe. The Universe itself is the Mother"

Matrusri Anasuya Devi (born 28 March 1923 – 1985), better known simply as Amma ["Mother"], was an Indian spiritual guru from Andhra Pradesh.

== Early life ==
Anasuya Devi, known as Jillellamudi Amma was an Indian mystic saint from Jillellamudi (now partially known as Arkapuri), Guntur district, in the state of Andhra Pradesh. Amma was born on March 28, 1923 in a small village in Andhra Pradesh. Her father was Seethapathi Rao, the village officer of Mannava, and her mother was Rangamma. Five of Seethapathi and Rangamma's children had died as infants before Anasuya's birth.

On 5 May 1936, Amma's wedding took place at Bapatla with Brahmandam Nageswara Rao, who later became the village officer of Jillellamudi.

== Charitable career ==
At Jillellamudi, as a young housewife, Amma looked after the needs of her family, including her two sons and daughter. In addition to performing her household duties, Amma devised and organized a grain bank to help the poor and needy.

She founded the common dining hall Annapurnalayam on 15 August 1958. This place serves simple vegetarian food day and night to all who came. In 1960, the "Andarillu (House of All)" was founded to provide lodging to the residents and visitors.

Amma established a Sanskrit school in 1966 (now the Matrusri Oriental College and High School) and within a relatively short time, one could hear the inmates speaking Sanskrit fluently.

Amma saw only good in people and had no concept of "sin", treating all alike irrespective of faith and religion.

== Death ==
Amma died on 12 June 1985.
