= Repalle revenue division =

Revenue division in Bapatla district, Andhra Pradesh, India

- Revenue division in Bapatla district
- Country: India
- State: Andhra Pradesh
- District: Bapatla
- Formed: 4 April 2022
- Founder: Government of Andhra Pradesh
- Time zone: UTC+05:30 (IST)

Repalle revenue division is an administrative division in the Bapatla district of the Indian state of Andhra Pradesh. It is one of the three revenue divisions in the district and comprises nine mandals. It was formed on 4 April 2022 along with the newly formed Bapatla district.

== Administration ==
The revenue division comprises nine mandals which include Amruthalur mandal ,Bhattiprolu mandal,Cherukupalle mandal,Kollur mandal,Nagaram mandal,Nizampatnam mandal,Repalle mandal,Tsunduru mandal,Vemuru mandal.
