= Rajavolu, Cherukupalle mandal =

Rajavolu
- Village
- Interactive map of Rajavolu
- Location in Andhra Pradesh, India
- Coordinates: 16.0521°N 80.7233°E
- Country: India
- State: Andhra Pradesh
- District: Bapatla
- Mandal: Cherukupalle

Government
  - Type: Panchayati raj
  - Body: Rajavolu gram panchayat

Area
  - Total: 672 ha (1,660 acres)

Population (2011)
  - Total: 3,755
  - Density: 559/km^{2} (1,450/sq mi)

Languages
  - Official: Telugu
- Time zone: UTC+5:30 (IST)
- PIN: 522259
- Area code: +91–8644
- Vehicle registration: AP

Rajavolu is a village in Bapatla district of the Indian state of Andhra Pradesh. It is located in Cherukupalle mandal of Repalle Revenue Division. PWS water scheme provides water to the residents.

== Geography ==
Rajavolu is situated to the east of the mandal headquarters, Arumbaka, at 16.0575465°N 80.6890654°E. It is spread over an area of 672 ha (1,660 acres).

== Demographics ==
The village is home to 3,755 people with 1,161 households. The population consists of 6% schedule castes and 1% schedule tribes. It has healthy sex ratio of 1016 females per 1000 male in the village. The population of this village increased by 0.8% between 2001-11.

== Government and politics ==
Rajavolu gram panchayat is the local self-government of the village. It is divided into wards and each ward is represented by a ward member.

== Education ==
As per the school information report for the academic year 2018–19, the village has a total of 4 schools. These schools include 2 Zilla/Mandal Parishad and 2 private schools.
