= Pittalavanipalem mandal =

- Mandal
- Interactive Map Outlining mandal
- Location in Andhra Pradesh, India
- Coordinates: 15.984°N 80.631°E
- Country: India
- State: Andhra Pradesh
- District: Bapatla
- Headquarters: Pittalavanipalem

Area
  - Total: 71.43 km^{2} (27.58 sq mi)

Population (2011)
  - Total: 53,269
  - Density: 745.8/km^{2} (1,931/sq mi)

Languages
  - Official: Telugu
- Time zone: UTC+5:30 (IST)

Pittalavanipalem is a mandal in the Bapatla district in the Coastal Andhra region of Andhra Pradesh, India. Its headquarters are in Pittalavanipalem.

== Demographics ==
Religions in Pittalavanipalem mandal (2011)
Religion	Percent
Hinduism	79.35%
Islam	16.75%
Christianity	2.55%
Other or not stated	1.35%
Distribution of religions

As of 2011 census, the mandal had a population of 38,609 in 10,992 households. The total population constitutes 19,175 males and 19,434 females — a sex ratio of 1014 females per 1000 males. 3,536 children are in the age group of 0–6 years, of which 1,857 are boys and 1,679 are girls — a sex ratio of 904 per 1000. The average literacy rate stands at 67.60% with 23,711 literates. Scheduled Castes and Scheduled Tribes make up 6,450 (16.71%) and 1,900 (4.92%) of the population respectively.

Languages of Pittalavanipalem mandal (2011)
1. Telugu (83.5%)
2. Urdu (16.3%)
3. Others (0.20%)

At the time of the 2011 census, 83.50% of the population spoke Telugu and 16.30% Urdu as their first language.
