= Jillellamudi =

- Village
- Interactive map of Jillellamudi
- Location in Andhra Pradesh, India
- Coordinates: 15°59′N 80°27′E
- Country: India
- State: Andhra Pradesh
- District: Bapatla
- Mandal: Bapatla

Government
  - Type: Panchayati raj
  - Body: Jillellamudi gram panchayat

Area
  - Total: 246 ha (610 acres)

Population (2011)
  - Total: 1,070
  - Density: 435/km^{2} (1,130/sq mi)

Languages
  - Official: Telugu
- Time zone: UTC+5:30 (IST)
- PIN: 522310
- Area code: +91–8643
- Vehicle registration: AP

Jillellamudi is a village in Bapatla district of the Indian state of Andhra Pradesh. It is located in Bapatla mandal in Tenali revenue division. Jillellamudi became popular because of spiritual leader Anasuya Devī also known as Jillellamudi Amma" / Viswajanani (meaning "mother of all").

== Geography ==
Jillellamudi is situated to the north of the mandal headquarters, Bapatla, at 15°59′N 80°27′E. It is spread over an area of 246 ha (610 acres).

== Governance ==
Jillellamudi Gram Panchayat is the local self-government of the village. It is divided into wards and each ward is represented by a ward member.

== Education ==
As per the school information report for the academic year 2018–19, the village has a total of 2 schools. These include one MPP and one private school.

== See also ==
- List of villages in Bapatla district
