= Nizampatnam =

Nizampatnam Petapoly, Peddapalli
- Village
- Location in Andhra Pradesh, India
- Coordinates: 15°54′N 80°40′E
- Country: India
- State: Andhra Pradesh
- District: Bapatla
- Mandal: Nizampatnam

Government
  - Type: Panchayati raj
  - Body: Nizampatnam gram panchayat

Area
  - Total: 2,276 ha (5,620 acres)

Population (2011)
  - Total: 20,982
  - Density: 921.9/km^{2} (2,388/sq mi)

Languages
  - Official: Telugu
- Time zone: UTC+5:30 (IST)
- PIN: 522314
- Area code: +91–8647
- Vehicle registration: AP

Nizampatnam is a village in Bapatla district of the Indian state of Andhra Pradesh. It is the mandal headquarters of Nizampatnam mandal in Repalle revenue division. The Dutch occupied the city for trading from 1606−1668.

== Etymology ==
Named after the Nizam of Hyderabad and natively known as Peddapalli, it was also referred as Petapoly by the Dutch settlers and by the British as Pettipolee or Pettipoly.

== History ==
It was ruled by Velanati Chodas in the 12-13th century CE. Later, it was under the kingdom of Golkonda. The British East India Company established a factory here in 1621, which closed in 1687 when all factories subordinate to Fort St. George were withdrawn. The Dutch occupied the city for trading from 1606−1668.

== Demographics ==
As of 2011 Census of India, Nizampatnam had a population of 20,982. The total population constitute, 10,623 males and 10,359 females —a sex ratio of 975 females per 1000 males. 2,105 children are in the age group of 0–6 years, of which 1,073 are boys and 1,032 are girls —a ratio of 962 per 1000. The average literacy rate stands at 68.78% with 12,984 literates, slightly higher than the state average of 67.41%.

== Governance ==
Nizampatnam gram panchayat is the local self-government of the village. It is divided into wards and each ward is represented by a ward member.

Nizampatnam falls in the Bapatla lok sabha constituency and Repalle assembly constituency. Anagani Satya Prasad of Telugu Desam Party is the present MLA of Repalle assembly constituency and Tenneti Krishna Prasad of TDP is the present MP of Bapatla lok sabha constituency.

== Education ==
As per the school information report for the academic year 2018–19, the village has a total of 31 schools. These include one government school, two other types, 22 Zilla Parishad/Mandal Parishad and six private schools.

== Economy ==
The main occupation of the people is agriculture, which includes cultivation of paddy. Fishing is also a predominant occupation due to its location on the seacoast and the presence of fishing harbor. The tourism also plays an important part in the economy of the village.

== Tourism ==
The tourist attractions include mangrove forests, light house and the Nizampatnam backwaters.

== See also ==
- Villages in Nizampatnam mandal
