= C. V. S. K. Sarma =

- Born: 15 July 1953 (age 73); Guntur, Andhra Pradesh
- Education: Delhi University; Delhi School of Economics; University of Ljubljana; University of Southern California
- Occupations: Economist; Indian Bureaucrat(retired)
- Last Post Held

Agriculture Production Commissioner & Spl. Chief Secretary to Government of Andhra Pradesh, Agriculture & Coop. Department

Dr. C. V. S. K. Sarma (born 1953) is an economist and a retired IAS officer (1980 batch) with exceptional public service record. He served as an IAS officer from 1980 to 2013, and retired as the Agriculture Production Commissioner & Spl. Chief Secretary to Government, Agriculture & Coop. Department, Government of Andhra Pradesh. He was also the Vice Chancellor, A.P. Horticulture University before he retired.

== Early life ==
Born in Repalle, a town in Guntur district of the Indian state of Andhra Pradesh, he completed his early education from schools in the town. He thereafter joined Delhi University where he completed his B.A.(Hon.)Economics in 1974. In 1976, he completed his master's in Economics from Delhi school of Economics, Delhi University, New Delhi, India. Later, in 1991, he left and went for study, doing his M.B.A. in Management from University of Ljubljana in Slovenia, Europe. By 2000, he had completed his Ph.D. in economics from the University of Southern California.

Sarma is married to Chavali Laxmi and the couple have a son named Arvind Krishna and a daughter Aruna Chavali.

== Career ==
C. V. S. K. Sarma joined the Indian Administrative Service (IAS) in 1980. He started his career as Sub-Collector in Asifabad in Adilabad District of erstwhile Andhra Pradesh and current Telangana. He then subsequently served a series of roles in Adilabad including Joint Collector and Project Officer (Utnoor). He was then posted to as Additional Commissioner to the erstwhile Municipal Corporation of Hyderabad. Post this he was Joint Collector in Kurnool District and Project Officer in Eturnagaram. Subsequently, he was appointed Collector & District Magistrate in the Adilabad District.

Through these years, his responsibilities included functions of planning, coordination & monitoring for the overall development of the District & State. During the time he concentrated on poverty alleviation, livelihoods promotion, and environmental conservation. Dr. Sarma, at personal risk, helped save a lot of flood victims during the floods in Warangal. Later on in 1988, he became the Director of Singareni Collieries Company Limited (Andhra Pradesh), which is a public sector coal company. His duties here involved planning & coordination for overall growth of the company, preparation of environmental assessment for projects, supervision of industrial relations, human resource management functions including recruitment and promotions. In 1990, Sarma was appointed to the position of Deputy Secretary, Ministry of Home Affairs, Government of India, New Delhi.

In 2000, Sarma became the Secretary and Principal Secretary to Government of Andhra Pradesh in the Irrigation department, and launched a massive Irrigation Development Programme called Jalayagnam within a very short time of six months. He finalised tenders for over Rs.30,000 crores and grounded all the Projects. Through personal inspection and motivation, he was able to achieve tremendous progress. Additional to this, he looked after administrative aspects of the entire Department consisting of all major, medium and minor irrigation projects and implementation of Command Area Development Programmes, obtaining clearances for these in-line with the guidelines set by Government of India.

Aside from his bureaucratic career, he maintained a strong interest in the academic world, especially in the subject of Economics. He collaborated with professors in several research projects and worked towards completion of Ph.D. dissertation on “Economic Reforms – Growth, Poverty and Income Distribution for sustainable Development – A CGE Analysis.”

Post retirement, Sarma continues his academic pursuits. In 2017, he presented papers on the agricultural and tourism industries in India at the Global Partnership Summit.

== Other Key Positions held ==
- Principal Secretary to Government, Agriculture & Coop. Department, Government of Andhra Pradesh (April, 2006 – April, 2007).
- Commissioner & Special Officer, Greater Hyderabad Municipal Corporation & E.O. Principal Secretary to Government, Municipal Administration & Urban Development Department & Chairman, Hyderabad Metro Rail (April, 2007 – September, 2008). Sarma was the first IAS officer to hold this post as part of the new formed Municipality.
- Principal Secretary to Government, Municipal Administration Department, Government of Andhra Pradesh & Chairman, Hyderabad Metro Rail (September, 2008 – October, 2009).
- Principal Secretary to Chief Minister & Chairman, Hyderabad Metro Rail (October, 2009 – November, 2010).

== Publications ==
- MBA thesis on – “Strategic Planning for a Coal Enterprise in Slovenia”.
- Efficiency, Equity and Environment – a CGE Analysis of India (forthcoming “Journal of Modeling of States”).
- Policy options for Sustainable Development – An Analysis.
- Several articles on Environmental policy & related issues in House Journals.

== Professional activities ==
- Member of American Economic Association.
- Member of Indian Administrative Service.
- Member of International Indian Economic Association.
