= Bapatla East =

Bapatla East (rural)
- Village
- Interactive map of Bapatla East (rural)
- Location in Andhra Pradesh, India
- Coordinates: 15.8958°N 80.5049°E
- Country: India
- State: Andhra Pradesh
- District: Bapatla
- Mandal: Bapatla

Government
  - Type: Panchayati raj
  - Body: Bapatla East Gram Panchayat

Area
  - Rural: 3,356 ha (8,290 acres)

Population (2011)
  - Rural: 8,908

Languages
  - Official: Telugu
- Time zone: UTC+5:30 (IST)
- PIN: 522310
- Area code: +91–8643
- Vehicle registration: AP

Bapatla East (rural) is a village in Bapatla district of the Indian state of Andhra Pradesh. It is located in Bapatla mandal of Tenali revenue division.

== Geography ==
Bapatla East is situated to the east of the mandal headquarters, Bapatla, at 15.8958°N 80.5049°E. It is spread over an area of 3,356 ha (8,290 acres).

== Governance ==
Bapatla East gram panchayat is the local self-government of the village. It is divided into wards and each ward is represented by a ward member.

== Education ==
As per the school information report for the academic year 2018–19, the village has a total of 24 schools. These include 8 Zilla/Mandal Parishad, 14 private and 2 other type of schools.

== See also ==
- Bapatla West
