= Kankatapalem =

- Village
- Location in Andhra Pradesh, India
- Coordinates: 15.923366°N 80.417469°E
- Country: India
- State: Andhra Pradesh
- District: Bapatla district
- Mandal: Bapatla

Government
  - Type: Panchayati raj
  - Body: Kankatapalem gram panchayat

Area
  - Total: 1,864 ha (4,610 acres)

Population (2011)
  - Total: 4,313
  - Density: 231.4/km^{2} (599.3/sq mi)

Languages
  - Official: Telugu
- Time zone: UTC+5:30 (IST)
- Area code: +91–8643
- Vehicle registration: AP

Kankatapalem is a village in Bapatla district of the Indian state of Andhra Pradesh. It is located in Bapatla mandal of Tenali revenue division.

== Geography ==
Kankatapalem is situated to the west of the mandal headquarters, Bapatla, at 15.923366°N 80.417469°E. It is spread over an area of 1,864 ha (4,610 acres).

== Governance ==
Kankatapalem gram panchayat is the local self-government of the village. It is divided into wards and each ward is represented by a ward member.

== Education ==
As per the school information report for the academic year 2018–19, the village has a total of 4 Zilla/Mandal Parishad.
