= Anagani Satya Prasad =

Indian politician

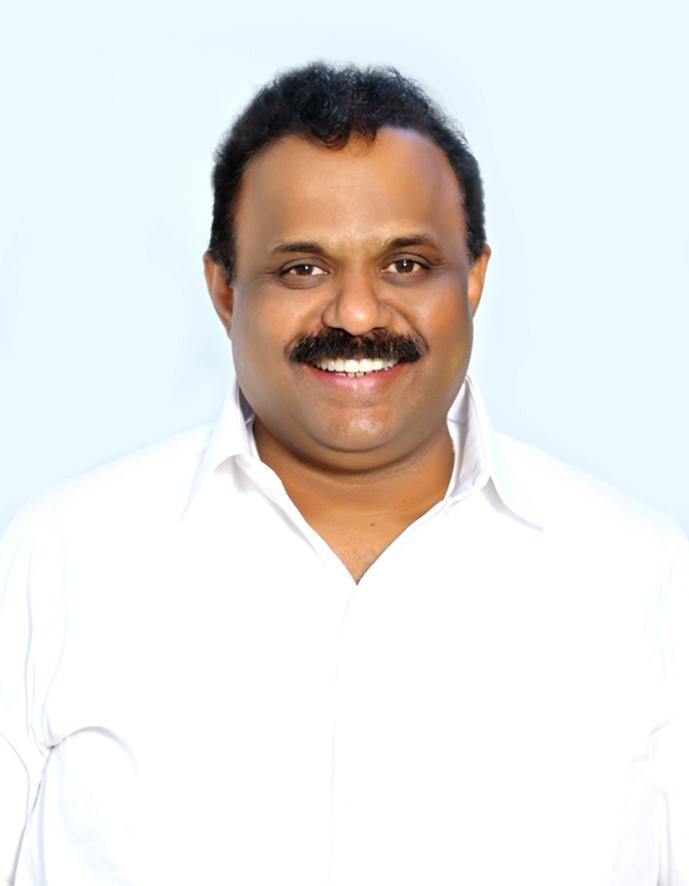

Minister of Revenue, Registration & Stamps Government of Andhra Pradesh
- Incumbent
- Assumed office 12 June 2024
- Governor: S. Abdul Nazeer
- Chief Minister: N. Chandrababu Naidu
- Preceded by: Dharmana Prasada Rao

Member of Legislative Assembly Andhra Pradesh
- Incumbent
- Assumed office 2014
- Preceded by: Mopidevi Venkata Ramana
- Constituency: Repalle

Personal details
- Born: 10 January 1972 (age 54) Gullapally, Cherukupalle Mandal, Guntur district, Andhra Pradesh, India
- Party: Telugu Desam Party
- Education: Anwar ul-uloom college, Hyderabad
- Occupation: Business Real estate

Anagani Satya Prasad is cabinet Minister ( Revenue, Registration & Stamps ) & MLA of Andhra Pradesh from Repalle Constituency in Guntur district, Andhra Pradesh. He was elected to assembly elections in 2014 & 2019 defeating Mopidevi Venkata Ramana of YSRCP and in 2024 defeating Evuri Ganesh of YSRCP.

== Personal life and education ==
Anagani Satya Prasad (born January 10, 1972) was son of Anagani Ranga Rao. He was the relative of Anagani Bhagavantha Rao who was elected as MLA from Kuchinapudi constituency and served as minister in 1970–80s. Though his family was native of Cherukuapalli mandal, Satya Prasad childhood and education happened in Hyderabad city itself. His educational qualifications are as follows.

He was unmarried as of June 2024 as per affidavit submitted for elections.

== Professional and political career ==
He was into real estate business on large scale in and around Hyderabad. He was a successful businessman and was paying IT returns of 9 lakhs and 12 lakhs per annum in 2012–13 and 2013–14. He does not have any criminal cases pending against him as of 2014.

After the reconstitution of constituencies in 2009 and subsequent defeat of TDP in Repalle, probable retirement of Mummaneni Venkata Subbaih (Then TDP candidate) brought Anagani Satya Prasad into the political arena. The decision of TDP to allot 100 seats to BCs then was an enabling factor for him. In 2009 he contested the elections but lost. But he emerged victorious in the 2014 and 2019 elections.

Election Year	Winner	Party	Votes Polled	Nearest Rival	Party	Votes Polled
2009	Mopidevi Venkata Ramana	INC	64,679	Anagani Satya Prasad	TDP	58,734
2014	Anagani Satya Prasad	TDP	85,076	Mopidevi Venkata Ramana	YSRCP	71,721
2019	Anagani Satya Prasad	TDP	89,975	Mopidevi Venkata Ramana	YSRCP	78,420
2024	Anagani Satya Prasad	TDP	1,11,129	Evuru Ganesh	YSRCP	71,182

He was member of Joint committee on Library in A. P. legislative assembly.
