= Jammulapalem =

- Village
- Interactive map of Jammulapalem
- Location in Andhra Pradesh, India
- Coordinates: 15°57′31″N 80°25′49″E
- Country: India
- State: Andhra Pradesh
- District: Bapatla
- Mandal: Bapatla

Government
  - Type: Panchayati raj
  - Body: Jammulapalem gram panchayat

Area
  - Total: 1,117 ha (2,760 acres)

Population (2011)
  - Total: 1,399
  - Density: 125.2/km^{2} (324.4/sq mi)

Languages
  - Official: Telugu
- Time zone: UTC+5:30 (IST)
- PIN: 522310
- Area code: +91–8643
- Vehicle registration: AP

Jammulapalem is a village in Bapatla district of the Indian state of Andhra Pradesh. It is located in Bapatla mandal of Tenali revenue division. The main occupation of the village is agriculture, for which the irrigation water is drawn from the Kommamuru and Poondla channels of Krishna Western Delta system.

== Geography ==
Jammulapalem is situated to the northwest of the mandal headquarters, Bapatla, at 15.936502°N 80.440997°E. It is spread over an area of 1,117 ha (2,760 acres).

== Governance ==
Jammulapalem gram panchayat is the local self-government of the village. It is divided into wards and each ward is represented by a ward member.

== Education ==
As per the school information report for the academic year 2018–19, the village has only one MPP school.
