= Nizampatnam mandal =

Nizampatnam mandal Petapoly, Peddapalli Mandal
- Mandal
- Interactive Map Outlining mandal
- Location in Andhra Pradesh, India
- Coordinates: 15°54′N 80°40′E
- Country: India
- State: Andhra Pradesh
- District: Bapatla
- Headquarters: Nizampatnam

Government
  - Body: Mandal Parishad
  - Tehsildar: S.V.RAMANA KUMARI F.A.C

Population (2011)
  - Total: 59,973

Languages
  - Official: Telugu
- Time zone: UTC+5:30 (IST)

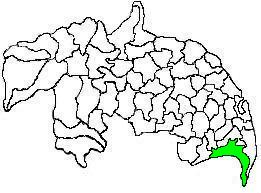
Mandal map of Guntur district showing Nizampatnam mandal (in green)

Nizampatnam mandal is one of the 25 mandals in Bapatla district of the state of Andhra Pradesh, India. It is under the administration of Repalle Revenue Division and the headquarters are located at Nizampatnam. The mandal is bounded by Repalle, Nagaram, Pittalavanipalem and Karlapalem mandals. The mandals lies on the shore of Bay of Bengal and a portion of the mandal lies on the banks of Krishna River.

== Etymology ==
Named after the Nizam of Hyderabad and natively known as Peddapalli mandal, it was also referred as Petapoly by the Dutch settlers and by the British as Pettipolee or Pettipoly.

== Demographics ==
As of 2011 census, the mandal had a population of 59,973. The total population constitute, 30,533 males and 29,440 females —a sex ratio of 964 females per 1000 males. 5,738 children are in the age group of 0–6 years, of which 3,018 are boys and 2,720 are girls. The average literacy rate stands at 62.64% with 33,970 literates.

== Administration ==
The mandal is under the control of a tahsildar. Nizampatnam mandal is one of the 4 mandals under Repalle (Assembly constituency), which in turn represents Bapatla (SC) (Lok Sabha constituency) of Andhra Pradesh.

== Towns and villages ==
As of 2011 census, the mandal has 8 villages and no towns. Nizampatnam is the most populated and Muthupalle Agraharam is the least populated villages in the mandal.

The settlements in the mandal are listed below:

1. Adavuladeevi
2. Amudalapalli
3. Dindi
4. Kothapalem
5. Kuchinapudi
6. Muthupalle Agraharam
7. Nizampatnam
8. Pallapatla
9. Pregnam

== Education ==
The mandal plays a major role in education for the rural students of the nearby villages. The primary and secondary school education is imparted by government, aided and private schools like Al Quamar High School, Vikas Public School, under the School Education Department of the state. As per the school information report for the academic year 2015–16, the mandal has more than 7,065 students enrolled in over 113 schools.

== See also ==
- List of mandals in Andhra Pradesh
- Villages in Nizampatnam mandal
