= Singupalem =

- Village
- Interactive map of Singupalem
- Location in Andhra Pradesh, India
- Coordinates: 15°57′25″N 80°52′13″E
- Country: India
- State: Andhra Pradesh
- District: Bapatla
- Mandal: Repalle

Government
  - Type: Panchayati raj
  - Body: Singupalem gram panchayat

Area
  - Total: 1,529 ha (3,780 acres)

Population (2011)
  - Total: 3,656
  - Density: 239.1/km^{2} (619.3/sq mi)

Languages
  - Official: Telugu
- Time zone: UTC+5:30 (IST)
- PIN: 522xxx
- Area code: +91–
- Vehicle registration: AP

Singupalem is a village in Bapatla district of the Indian state of Andhra Pradesh. It is located in Repalle mandal of Tenali revenue division.

== Governance ==
Singupalem gram panchayat is the local self-government of the village. It is divided into wards and each ward is represented by a ward member. The elected members of the gram panchayat is headed by a sarpanch.
