= Appapuram, Nadendla mandal =

Appapuram
- Village
- Interactive map of Appapuram
- Country: India
- State: Andhra Pradesh
- District: Palnadu district

Population
  - Total: 4,280

Languages
  - Official: Telugu
- Time zone: UTC+5:30 (IST)
- PIN: 522611
- Telephone code: 086472-
- Vehicle registration: AP-07
- Nearest city: Chilakaluripet Narasaraopet
- Sex ratio: 10:8 ♂/♀
- Literacy: 80%
- Lok Sabha constituency: Narasaraopet
- Vidhan Sabha constituency: Chilakaluripet
- Website: www.appapuram.org

Appapuram is a village in the Nadendla mandal of Palnadu district, Andhra Pradesh, India. Surrounding settlements include Nadendla, Kavuru, and Ganapavaram.
