= Bapatla West =

Bapatla West (rural)
- Village
- Interactive map of Bapatla West (rural)
- Location in Andhra Pradesh, India
- Coordinates: 15.8774°N 80.4187°E
- Country: India
- State: Andhra Pradesh
- District: Bapatla
- Mandal: Bapatla

Government
  - Type: Panchayati raj

Area
  - Rural: 1,590 ha (3,900 acres)

Population (2011)
  - Rural: 8,719

Languages
  - Official: Telugu
- Time zone: UTC+5:30 (IST)
- PIN: 522310
- Area code: +91–8643
- Vehicle registration: AP

Bapatla West (rural) is a village in Bapatla district of the Indian state of Andhra Pradesh. It is located in Bapatla mandal of Tenali revenue division.

== Geography ==
Bapatla West is situated to the east of the mandal headquarters, Bapatla, at 15.8774°N 80.4187°E. It is spread over an area of 1,590 ha (3,900 acres).

== Education ==
As per the school information report for the academic year 2018–19, the village has a total of 20 schools. These include 2 government, 6 Zilla/Mandal Parishad and 12 private schools.

== See also ==
- Bapatla East
