= Bapatla mandal =

Administrative division of Andhra Pradesh, India

- Mandal
- Interactive map of Bapatla mandal
- Location in Andhra Pradesh, India
- Coordinates: 15°53′20″N 80°28′12″E
- Country: India
- State: Andhra Pradesh
- District: Bapatla
- Headquarters: Bapatla

Government
  - Body: Mandal Parishad
  - Tehsildar: T. Valliah

Area
  - Total: 233.91 km^{2} (90.31 sq mi)

Population (2011)
  - Total: 143,825
  - Density: 614.87/km^{2} (1,592.5/sq mi)

Languages
- Time zone: UTC+5:30 (IST)

Bapatla mandal is one of the 25 mandals in Bapatla district of the state of Andhra Pradesh, India. It is under the administration of Bapatla revenue division and the headquarters are located at Bapatla. The mandal is bounded by Kakumanu, Ponnur, Karlapalem mandals of Guntur district. It also shares borders with Prakasam district and a portion of it lies on the coast of Bay of Bengal.

== Demographics ==
Religions in Bapatla mandal (2011)
Religion	Percent
Hinduism	89.93%
Islam	6.96%
Christianity	2.70%
Other or not stated	0.41%
Distribution of religions

As of 2011 census, the mandal had a population of 143,825 in 38,605 households. The total population constitute, 70,847 males and 72,978 females — a sex ratio of 1030 females per 1000 males. 13,371 children are in the age group of 0–6 years, of which 6,856 are boys and 6,515 are girls — a sex ratio of 950 per 1000. The average literacy rate stands at 71.79% with 93,653 literates. 49.21% of the population lives in urban areas. Scheduled Castes and Scheduled Tribes make up 28,807 (20.03%) and 8,492 (5.90%) respectively.

Languages of Bapatla mandal (2011)
1. Telugu (93.7%)
2. Urdu (5.59%)
3. Others (0.76%)

At the time of the 2011 census, 93.65% of the population spoke Telugu and 5.59% Urdu as their first language.

== Settlements ==
As of 2011 census, the mandal has 21 settlements. It includes 20 villages and 1 town of Bapatla.

The settlements in the mandal are listed below:

1. Adivi
2. Appikatla
3. Bapatla (M)
4. Bapatla East (Rural)
5. Bapatla West (Rural)
6. Bharthipudi
7. Cheruvu
8. ఈతేరు(Etheru)
9. Gopapuram
10. Gudipudi
11. Jammulapalem
12. Jillellamudi
13. Kankatapalem
14. Maruproluvaripalem (Rural)
15. Mulapalem
16. Murukondapadu
17. Narasayapalem
18. Neredupalle
19. Palaparthipadu
20. Poondla
21. Velicherla

Note: M-Municipality

== Government and politics ==
The mandal is under the control of a tahsildar and the present tahsildar is T. Valliah. Bapatla mandal is one of the 3 mandals under Bapatla Assembly constituency, which is part of Bapatla Lok Sabha constituency. Current MLA for Bapatla is Kona Raghupathi (YSRCP) and MP is Nandigam Suresh (YSRCP).

== See also ==
- List of mandals in Andhra Pradesh
- List of villages in Guntur district
