= Gudavalli, Cherukupalle mandal =

Gudavalli
- Village
- Sri Gadde Lalitha Devi Smaraka Library
- Interactive map of Gudavalli
- Location in Andhra Pradesh, India
- Coordinates: 16.07246°N 80.722733°E
- Country: India
- State: Andhra Pradesh
- District: Bapatla
- Mandal: Cherukupalle

Government
  - Type: Panchayati raj
  - Body: Gudavalli gram panchayat

Area
  - Total: 1,299 ha (3,210 acres)

Population (2011)
  - Total: 4,022
  - Density: 309.6/km^{2} (801.9/sq mi)

Languages
  - Official: Telugu
- Time zone: UTC+5:30 (IST)
- PIN: 522259
- Area code: +91–8644
- Vehicle registration: AP

Gudavalli is a village in Bapatla district of the Indian state of Andhra Pradesh. It is the located in Cherukupalle mandal of Tenali revenue division.

== Geography ==
Gudavalli is situated to the north of the mandal headquarters, Arumbaka, at 16.07246°N 80.722733°E. It is spread over an area of 1,299 ha (3,210 acres).

== History ==
As per the Gudavalli Village kaifiyat (Village Kaifiyats of Guntur Vol-5) this village used to be called as Kumudavalli. There used to be some famous temples in the village.

As per the kaifiyat in 1128 AD, Kulotthunga Chola king made certain land grants to the temples in the village and new constructions. He also made an inscription (sasanam) regarding these grants.

In 1144 AD, this village was granted as Mirasi to certain Brahmins by Goparaju Ramanna the then prime minister to Ganapati king of Gajapathi clan

During freedom struggle, Nehru Granthalayam (library) was established in Gudavalli village as part of library movement to educate the people. Mahatma Gandhi visited the mandal on 23 December 1933 as part of harijan upliftment tour. He laid foundation for Vinayashram building in Kavuru village, opened temple for harijans and gave a short speech. A tree planted by Gandhiji in 1933 is still alive in this ashramam. Gandhiji again visited Vinayashram on 23 January 1937 during his tour of cyclone effected areas of coastal Andhra. Another ashramam (Maitreya Ashramam) to his memory was established in Gudavalli village and functions until date.

During freedom movement, a library named Nehru Granthalayam was established in the village for political education of the people. Maitreya Ashramam in Ashram bazaar was established in 1936 to commemorate Gandhiji visit to the mandal.

== Demographics ==
The village is home to 4,022 people with 1186 households. The population consists of 27% schedule castes and 7% schedule tribes. It has a sex ratio of 1074 females per 1000 males in the village. The population of this village increased by 6.3% between 2001 and 2011

== Governance ==
Gudavalli gram panchayat is the local self-government of the village. It is divided into wards and each ward is represented by a ward member.

== Education ==
As per the school information report for the academic year 2018–19, the village has a total of 7 schools. These schools include 3 Mandal Parishad and 4 private schools. A primary school established in the village was upgraded to high school in 1944–45, using the funds collected for war efforts. It was named as Muniswamy Naidu Memorial (MNM) high school, in memory of Sri Bollina Muniswamy Naidu, ex-Chief Minister of Madras Presidency.

Sri Tripuraneni Rama Swamy Chowdary ITI (industrial Training Institute) was established in this village for imparting technical skills to people of surrounding area

Academy of Rural Development and Research Centre (Defunct at present) was established in 1970-80 between Gudavalli and Nadimpalli villages by Shri Kotapati Murahari Rao to study the rural development activities. This academy used to train anganwadi workers until late 1990s.
