= Poondla =

- Village
- Interactive map of Poondla
- Location in Andhra Pradesh, India
- Coordinates: 15°59′N 80°29′E
- Country: India
- State: Andhra Pradesh
- District: Bapatla
- Mandal: Bapatla

Government
  - Type: Panchayati raj
  - Body: Poondla gram panchayat

Area
  - Total: 1,112 ha (2,750 acres)

Population (2011)
  - Total: 2,846
  - Density: 255.9/km^{2} (662.9/sq mi)

Languages
  - Official: Telugu
- Time zone: UTC+5:30 (IST)
- PIN: 522310
- Area code: +91–8643
- Vehicle registration: AP

Poondla is a village in Bapatla district of the Indian state of Andhra Pradesh. It is located in Bapatla mandal of Tenali revenue division.

== Geography ==
Kankatapalem is situated to the north of the mandal headquarters, Bapatla, at 15°59′N 80°29′E. It is spread over an area of 1,112 ha (2,750 acres). The irrigation water for the village and its surrounding areas is drawn from Prakasam Barrage reservoir, through the Kommamuru and Poondla channels of Krishna Western Delta system.

== Governance ==
Poondla gram panchayat is the local self-government of the village. It is divided into wards and each ward is represented by a ward member.

== Education ==
As per the school information report for the academic year 2018–19, the village has 3 Zilla/Mandal Parishad.
