= Ponnapalle =

- Village
- Interactive map of Ponnapalle
- Location in Andhra Pradesh, India
- Coordinates: 16.0575465°N 80.6890654°E
- Country: India
- State: Andhra Pradesh
- District: Bapatla
- Mandal: Cherukupalle

Government
  - Type: Panchayati raj
  - Body: Ponnapalle gram panchayat

Area
  - Total: 671 ha (1,660 acres)

Population (2011)
  - Total: 3,267
  - Density: 487/km^{2} (1,260/sq mi)

Languages
  - Official: Telugu
- Time zone: UTC+5:30 (IST)
- PIN: 522259
- Area code: +91–8644
- Vehicle registration: AP

Ponnapalle is a village in Bapatla district of the Indian state of Andhra Pradesh. It is the located in Cherukupalle mandal of Tenali revenue division.

== Geography ==
Ponnapalle is situated to the northeast of the mandal headquarters, Arumbaka, at 16.0575465°N 80.6890654°E. It is spread over an area of 671 ha (1,660 acres).

== History ==
This village was gifted by Komati Peda Vemareddy, the ruler of Kondaveedu, to a Brahmin called Ponnapalli Peri Bhaskarudu at the time of a lunar eclipse as the latter is said to have cured the ruler's son from elephantasis with his spiritual powers. Srinadha, the great Telugu poet, wrote about it in Sanskrit slokas on stone slabs and they are now preserved in the Government Oriental Manuscripts Library at Madras

A Manual of the Kistna District, in the Presidency of Madras, compiled in the year 1881-82, mentions the villages Ponnapalle and Arepalli as inam villages and the present area under Repalli Taluka. Given the presence of agraharms in these two villages, they might have been inams given to Brahmins at that time.

== Demographics ==
The village is home to 3,267 people with 980 households. The population consists of 0% schedule castes and 11% schedule tribes. It has healthy sex ratio of 1018 females per 1000 male in the village. The population of this village increased by 9.6% between 2001-11.

== Government and politics ==
Ponnapalle gram panchayat is the local self-government of the village. It is divided into wards and each ward is represented by a ward member.

== Education ==
As per the school information report for the academic year 2018–19, the village has a total of 3 schools. These schools include 1 government school, 2 Mandal Parishad and 3 private schools.
