= Repalle Municipality =

Repalle Municipal Council

Type
- Type: Municipal council of the Repalle
- Established: 1965; 61 years ago
- Seats: 40

Elections
- Voting system: First-past-the-post
- Last election: 2014
- Next election: 2022

Website
- cdma.ap.gov.in/en/kavali-municipality

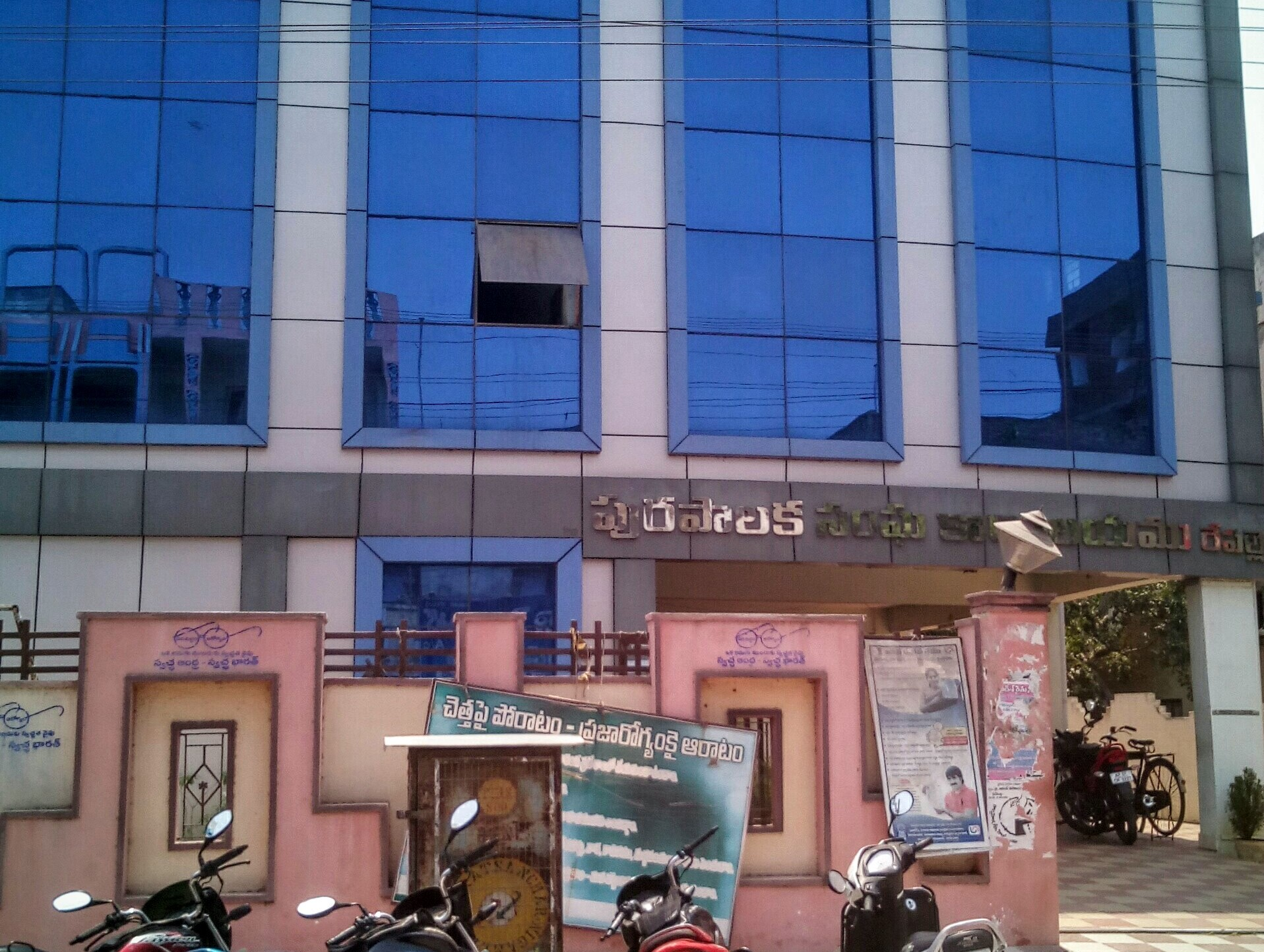

Repalle Municipality is the local self-government in Repalle of the Indian state of Andhra Pradesh. It is classified as a second grade municipality.

== Administration ==
The municipality was formed in 1956 and is spread in an area of 10.91 km^{2} (4.21 mi^{2}) and comprises 28 election wards. The present municipal commissioner of the city is Vijaya Saradhi.

.

== Civic works and services ==
The towns residents rely on borewells, public taps for water, with the municipal department supplying 4 MLD (Million liters per day) of drinking water, 100 LPCD (litres per capita per day) of per capita water, and maintains 125 public taps, 324 public bore-wells. There are 96.90 km (60.21 mi) of roads, 121.80 km (75.68 mi) of drains, 3 km (1.9 mi) of storm drains, 2937 street lights, 3 recreational parks and 2 public markets. For public health, the municipality has 2 dispensaries and to impart primary and secondary education, it maintains 12 elementary 7 secondary schools.

== See also ==
- List of municipalities in Andhra Pradesh
