= Katragadda =

Katragadda (Telugu: కాట్రగడ్డ) is a Telugu surname. Notable people with the surname include:

- Katragadda Murari (1944–2022), Indian film producer
- Aruna Miller (née Katragadda) (born 1964), Indian-American politician
- Katragadda Lokesh(born 2010)
