= Penumudi =

- Village
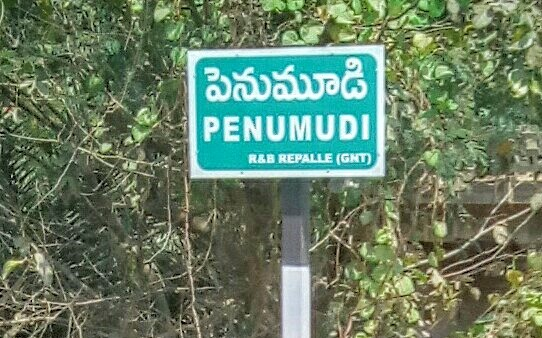
- A signboard of Penumudi village
- Interactive map of Penumudi
- Location in Andhra Pradesh, India
- Coordinates: 16.0330°N 80.8703°E
- Country: India
- State: Andhra Pradesh
- District: Bapatla
- Mandal: Repalle

Government
  - Type: Panchayati raj
  - Body: Penumudi gram panchayat

Area
  - Total: 553 ha (1,370 acres)

Population (2011)
  - Total: 3,534
  - Density: 639/km^{2} (1,660/sq mi)

Languages
  - Official: Telugu
- Time zone: UTC+5:30 (IST)
- PIN: 522xxx
- Area code: +91–
- Vehicle registration: AP

Penumudi is a village in the Bapatla district of the Indian state of Andhra Pradesh. It is located on the banks of the Krishna River, in Repalle mandal of Tenali revenue division.

== Geography ==
Penumudi is located at 16.3052°N 80.6182°E. The village is spread over an area of 5.53 km^{2} (2.14 sq mi).

== Demographics ==
As of 2011 census, Penumudi had a population of 3,534 with 1,044 households. The total population constitute, 1,752 males and 1,782 females —a sex ratio of 1017 females per 1000 males. 316 children are in the age group of 0–6 years, of which 170 are boys and 146 are girls. The average literacy rate stands at 63.05% with 2,029 literates, lower than the state average of 67.41%.

== Transportation ==
National Highway 216 (India) passes through this penumudi village. It is a main and major Spur road of National Highway 16 (India). This road connects Ongole and Kathipudi . This Highway is called Coastal Highway of andhrapradesh.

== Governance ==
Penumudi gram panchayat is the local self-government of the village. It is divided into wards and each ward is represented by a ward member. The elected members of the gram panchayat is headed by a sarpanch.

== Economy ==
Agriculture and Aquaculture are the main occupations of the villagers. Paddy and black gram and corn are the major crops cultivated. While, prawns are the main source of income in aquaculture.
