= Appapuram, Kakumanu mandal =

Appapuram Village Appapuram
- Village
- Interactive map of Appapuram Village
- Location in Andhra Pradesh, India
- Coordinates: 16.0188°N 80.4285°E
- Country: India
- State: Andhra Pradesh
- District: Guntur

Population (2017)
  - Total: 2,400

Languages
  - Official: Telugu
- Time zone: UTC+5:30 (IST)
- PIN: 522112
- Vehicle registration: AP-07
- Nearest city: Bapatla
- Sex ratio: 0.97:1 ♂/♀
- Literacy: 67%
- Lok Sabha constituency: Guntur
- Vidhan Sabha constituency: Prathipadu

Appapuram is a village in Guntur district of the Indian state of Andhra Pradesh. It is located in Kakumanu mandal of Tenali revenue division. As of 2011, the Census of India reported that the village consisted of 2,792 people spread across 870 households.
