= Nadimpalli, Chittoor =

Nadimpalli
- Village
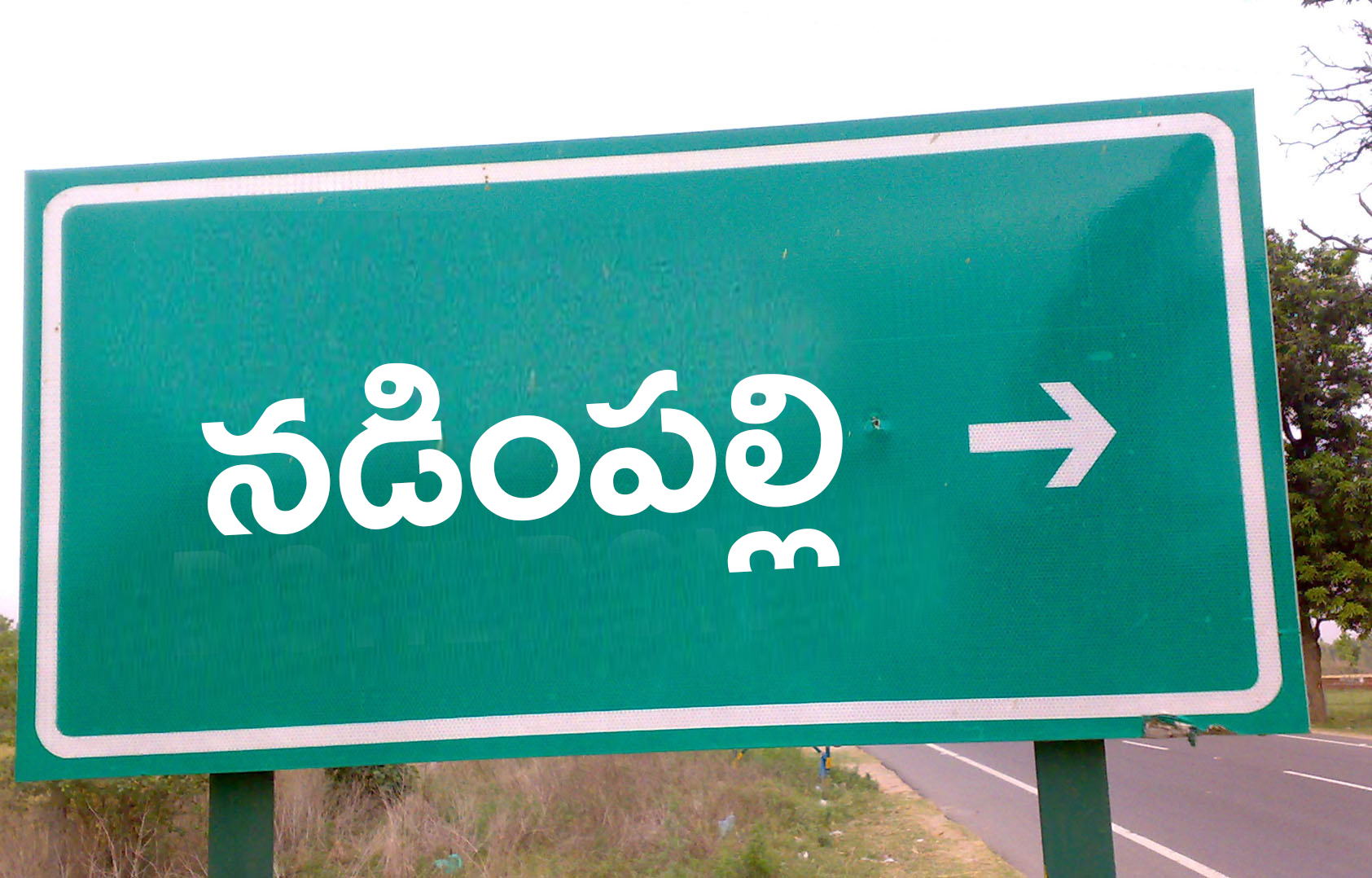
- Interactive map of Nadimpalli
- Location in Andhra Pradesh, India
- Coordinates: 13.3717401°N 79.1299206°E
- Country: India
- State: Andhra Pradesh
- Chittoor: Chittoor
- Mandal: Puthalapattu
- Gram panchayat: Pantapalle
- Seat: Panchayth Office

Government
  - Type: Panchayati raj
  - Body: Pantapalle Gram panchayat
  - Sarpanch: Neeraja Gadde
  - Upa Sarpanch: Shri Naga Venkata Teja Sai Prasad Pranav Nadimpalli.

Population
  - Total: 368

Languages
  - Official: Telugu
- Time zone: UTC+5:30
- PIN: 517124

Nadimpalli is a remote rural village in Puthalapattu mandal of Chittoor district in Andhra Pradesh in India.

== Government and politics ==
Pantapalle gram panchayat is the local self-government of the village. It is divided into wards and each ward is represented by a ward member. As per the recent election results, Smt. Neeraja Gadde is the current sarpanch of the panchayat and Vinod Kumar J is the upa-sarpanch of the panchayat.

== Agriculture ==
The major crops in this village are Paddy, Sugarcane, Groundnuts, Mango etc. The majority of the land is utilized for agriculture in this village.

== Education ==
As per the school information report for the academic year 2020–21, the village has one Mandal Parishad school.

== Temples ==
There are multiple temples in the Nadimpalli village which are listed below.

1. Sri Rama Temple
2. Virabhadra Swamy Temple

== Festivals ==
People in this village celebrate the below festivals.

1. Makara Sankranthi (aka Pongal) - 3/4 Days
2. Ugadi - 1 Day
3. Sri Rama Navami - 1/2 Days
4. Varalakshmi Vratham - 1 Day
5. Vinayaka Chavithi (aka Ganesh Chaturthi) - 3 Days
6. Vijaya Dasami (aka Dussehra) - 1 Day
7. Deepavali (aka Diwali) - 2 Days
8. Karthika Pournami - 1 Day

== Tourism Places ==
1. Kalikiri Konda
2. Puligundu, Penumur
3. Kanipakam

== Transportation ==
There is only road convey available to reach this village, however other designates of convey is available to nearby locations.

=== Air ===
The nearest airport is Tirupati Airport, from there trains (Indian Railways) & buses (APSRTC) are available to Puthalapattu. Plenty of shared auto rickshaw's are available from Puthalapattu (ask for Polavaram Auto stand) to Nadimpalli with a fare of Rs.15 or Rs.20 per head.

=== Train ===
Trains are available from Tirupati, Pakala, Katpadi, Vellore, Chittoor, Renigunta to Puthalapattu. Alternatively, one can reach any of the mentioned railway stations and took a bus to Puthalapattu or Chittoor. Puthalapattu railway station is 2 kilometres away from the actual town and located near Oddepalli. Few auto rickshaw's will be available from Railway station to Puthalapattu town. One can walk towards Bangalore-Tirupati highway about 850 metres and take an auto rickshaw to Puthalapattu town. Plenty of shared auto rickshaw's are available from Puthalapattu (ask for Polavaram Auto stand) to Nadimpalli with a fare of Rs.15 or Rs.20 per head.

=== Road ===
Plenty of buses available from Chittoor, Pileru, Pakala, Kanipakam, Tirupati etc., to Puthalapattu which are operated by APSRTC and other public/private travels. Plenty of shared auto rickshaw's are available from Puthalapattu (ask for Polavaram Auto stand) to Nadimpalli with a fare of Rs.15 or Rs.20 per head. Alternatively, one can reach Nadimpalli in their personal vehicles like car, bike etc.,
