= Appikatla =

- Village
- Interactive map of Appikatla
- Location in Andhra Pradesh, India
- Coordinates: 15°58′N 80°30′E
- Country: India
- State: Andhra Pradesh
- District: Bapatla
- Mandal: Bapatla

Government
  - Type: Panchayati raj
  - Body: Appikatla Gram Panchayat

Area
  - Total: 791 ha (1,950 acres)

Population (2011)
  - Total: 1,831
  - Density: 231/km^{2} (600/sq mi)

Languages
  - Official: Telugu
- Time zone: UTC+5:30 (IST)
- PIN: 522310
- Area code: +91–8643
- Vehicle registration: AP

Appikatla is a village in Bapatla district of the Indian state of Andhra Pradesh. It is located in Bapatla mandal of Tenali revenue division.

== Geography ==
Appikatla is situated to the northwest of the mandal headquarters, Bapatla, at 15°58′N 80°30′E. It is spread over an area of 791 ha (1,950 acres).

== Governance ==
Appikatla Gram Panchayat is the local self-government of the village. There are 10 wards, each represented by an elected ward member. The present sarpanch is vacant, elected by the ward members. The village is administered by the Bapatla Mandal Parishad at the intermediate level of panchayat raj institutions.

== Education ==
As per the school information report for the academic year 2018–19, the village has a total of 5 schools. These include one Government School, 2 Zilla/Mandal Parishad and 2 private schools.

== Transport ==
Appikatla railway station, a Non-Suburban Grade-6 (NSG-6) station in the Vijayawada railway division of the South Coast Railway zone, provides rail connectivity to the village.
