= Repalle Assembly constituency =

Constituency of the Andhra Pradesh Legislative Assembly, India

Coordinates: 16.12°N 80.83°E

Repalle
- Constituency No. 90 for the Andhra Pradesh Legislative Assembly
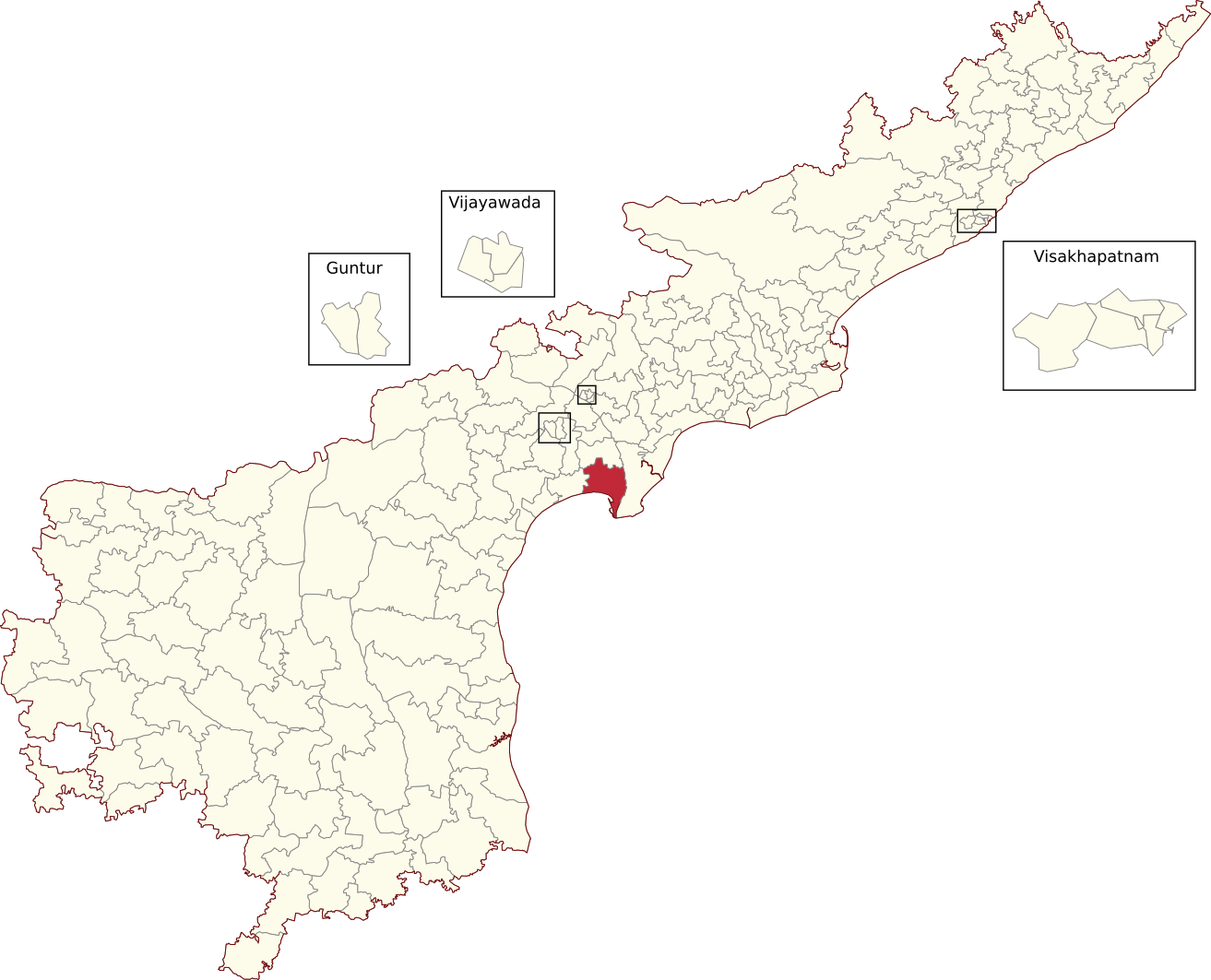
- Location of Repalle Assembly constituency within Andhra Pradesh

Constituency details
- Country: India
- Region: South India
- State: Andhra Pradesh
- District: Bapatla district
- Lok Sabha constituency: Bapatla
- Established: 1951
- Total electors: 194,748
- Reservation: None

Member of Legislative Assembly
- 16th Andhra Pradesh Legislative Assembly
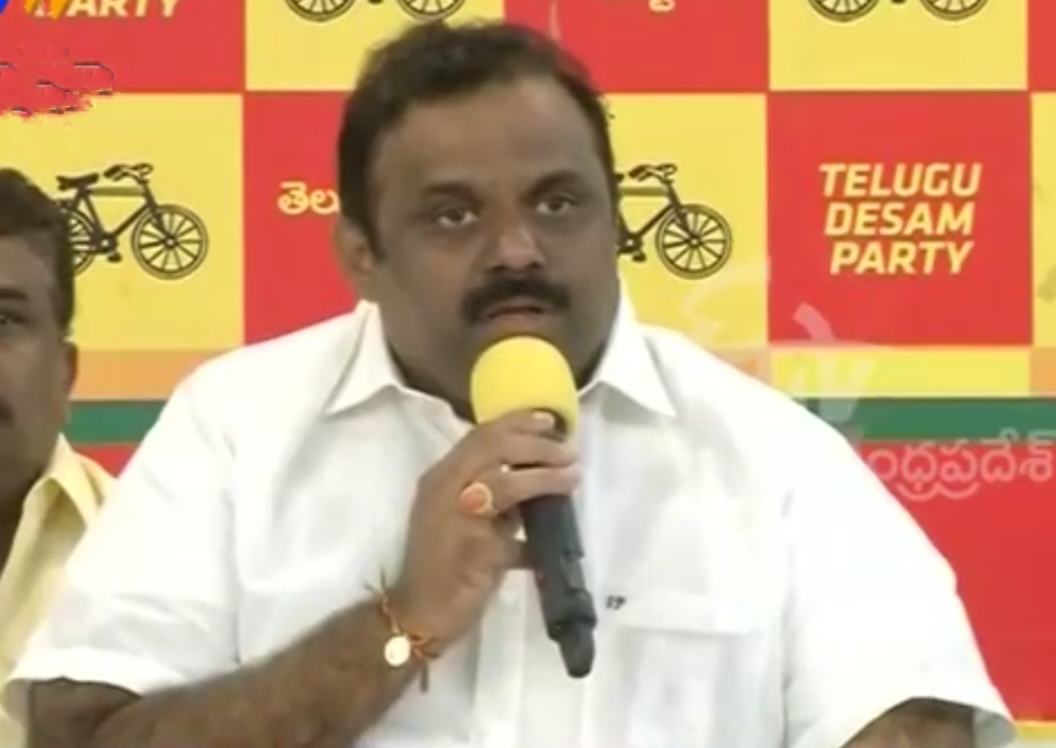
- Incumbent Anagani Satya Prasad
- Party: TDP
- Alliance: NDA
- Elected year: 2024

Repalle is a constituency in Bapatla district of Andhra Pradesh that elects representatives to the Andhra Pradesh Legislative Assembly in India. It is one of the seven assembly segments of Bapatla Lok Sabha constituency.

Anagani Satya Prasad is the current MLA of the constituency, having won the 2024 Andhra Pradesh Legislative Assembly election from Telugu Desam Party. As of 2019, there are a total of 194,748 electors in the constituency. The constituency was established in 1951, as per the Delimitation Orders (1951).

== Mandals ==
Mandals
Nizampatnam
Nagaram
Cherukupalle
Repalle

== Members of the Legislative Assembly ==
Year	Member	Political party
1952	Moturu Hanumanth Rao	Communist Party of India
1955	Yadam Chennaiah	Indian National Congress
1962	Koratala Satyanarayana	Communist Party of India
1967	Yadam Chennaiah	Indian National Congress
1972	Yadla Venkata Rao	Indian National Congress
1978	Koratala Satyanarayana	Communist Party of India
1983	Yadla Venkata Rao	Telugu Desam Party
1985	Yadla Venkata Rao	Telugu Desam Party
1989	Ambati Rambabu	Indian National Congress
1994	Mummaneni Venkata Subbaiah	Telugu Desam Party
1999	Mummaneni Venkata Subbaiah	Telugu Desam Party
2004	Devineni Malikarjuna Rao	Indian National Congress
2009	Mopidevi Venkataramana	Indian National Congress
2014	Anagani Satya Prasad	Telugu Desam Party
2019	Anagani Satya Prasad	Telugu Desam Party
2024	Anagani Satya Prasad	Telugu Desam Party

== Election results ==
=== 1952 ===
1952 Madras State Legislative Assembly election: Repalle
Party	Candidate	Votes	%	±%
CPI	M. Hanumantha Rao	29,116	51.56%	
INC	Kalluri Chandramouli	19,105	33.83%	33.83%
KLP	Gogarneni Ramandham	5,063	8.97%	
KMPP	Neelam Ragaviaj	1,960	3.47%	
Socialist Party (India)	S. Paul	1,223	2.17%	
Margin of victory		10,011	17.73%	
Turnout		56,467	79.46%	
Registered electors		71,067		
CPI win (new seat)				

=== 1955 ===
1955 Andhra State Legislative Assembly election: Repalle
Party	Candidate	Votes	%	±%
INC	Chennaiah Yadam	22,893	59.53%	
CPI	Moturu Hanumanth Rao	15,473	40.24%	
Margin of victory		7,420	19.29%	
Turnout		38,456	78.35%	
Registered electors		49,084		
INC gain from CPI		Swing		

=== 1962 ===
1962 Andhra Pradesh Legislative Assembly election: Repalle
Party	Candidate	Votes	%	±%
CPI	Koratla Satyanarayana	15,699	36.12%	
INC	Chenniah Yadam	14,998	34.51%	
Margin of victory		7,01	1.61%	
Turnout		44,982	77.92%	
Registered electors		57,730		
CPI gain from INC		Swing		

=== 1967 ===
1967 Andhra Pradesh Legislative Assembly election: Repalle
Party	Candidate	Votes	%	±%
INC	Chennaiah Yadam	26,595	54.46%	
CPI(M)	Koratla Satyanarayana	17,551	37.26%	
Margin of victory		9,044	19.20%	
Turnout		48,880	77.44%	
Registered electors		63,120		
INC gain from CPI		Swing		

=== 1972 ===
1972 Andhra Pradesh Legislative Assembly election: Repalle
Party	Candidate	Votes	%	±%
INC	Yadla Venkata Rao	30,243	56.62%	
Independent	Sitaramaiah Myneni	21,335	39.95%	
Margin of victory		8,908	16.68%	
Turnout		54,301	75.62%	
Registered electors		71,806		
INC hold		Swing		

=== 1978 ===
1978 Andhra Pradesh Legislative Assembly election: Repalle
Party	Candidate	Votes	%	±%
CPI(M)	Koratala Satyanaryana	26,319	40.01%	
INC(I)	Chennaiah Yadam	22,846	34.73%	
Margin of victory		3473	5.28%	
Turnout		66,937	77.94%	
Registered electors		85,888		
CPI(M) gain from INC		Swing		

=== 1983 ===
1983 Andhra Pradesh Legislative Assembly election: Repalle
Party	Candidate	Votes	%	±%
TDP	Yadla Venkata Rao	38,875	62.18%	
INC	Mandali Subramanyam	16,567	26.50%	
Margin of victory		22,308	35.68%	
Turnout		63,391	70.03%	
Registered electors		90,516		
TDP gain from CPI(M)		Swing		

=== 1985 ===
1985 Andhra Pradesh Legislative Assembly election: Repalle
Party	Candidate	Votes	%	±%
TDP	Yadla Venkata Rao	32,658	48.25%	
INC	Kantamaneni Rajendra Prasad	21,832	32.26%	
Margin of victory		10,826	16.00%	
Turnout		68,452	70.77%	
Registered electors		96,719		
TDP hold		Swing		

=== 1989 ===
1989 Andhra Pradesh Legislative Assembly election: Repalle
Party	Candidate	Votes	%	±%
INC	Ambati Rambabu	42,698	51.90%	
TDP	Mummaneni Venkata Subbaiah	39,360	47.84%	
Margin of victory		3,338	4.06%	
Turnout		84,048	75.27%	
Registered electors		111,664		
INC gain from TDP		Swing		

=== 1994 ===
1994 Andhra Pradesh Legislative Assembly election: Repalle
Party	Candidate	Votes	%	±%
TDP	Mummaneni Venkata Subbaiah	50,095	62.45%	
INC	Ambati Rambabu	23,746	29.60%	
Margin of victory		26,349	32.85%	
Turnout		81,323	71.35%	
Registered electors		113,979		
TDP gain from INC		Swing		

=== 1999 ===
1999 Andhra Pradesh Legislative Assembly election: Repalle
Party	Candidate	Votes	%	±%
TDP	Mummaneni Venkata Subbaiah	46,566	59.68%	
INC	Ambati Rambabu	25,799	33.07%	
Margin of victory		20,767	26.62%	
Turnout		79,700	64.47%	
Registered electors		123,626		
TDP hold		Swing		

=== 2004 ===
2004 Andhra Pradesh Legislative Assembly election: Repalle
Party	Candidate	Votes	%	±%
INC	Devineni Mallikharjuna Rao	50,190	59.18%	
TDP	Mummaneni Venkata Subbaaiah	32,849	38.74%	
Margin of victory		17,341	20.45%	
Turnout		84,810	76.80%	
Registered electors		110,431		
INC gain from TDP		Swing		

=== 2009 ===
2009 Andhra Pradesh Legislative Assembly election: Repalle
Party	Candidate	Votes	%	±%
INC	Mopidevi Venkataramana	64,679	41.10%	
TDP	Anagani Satya Prasad	58,734	37.32%	
PRP	DR. Evuru Ganesh	26,516	16.85%	
Margin of victory		5,945	3.78%	
Turnout		157,655	78.88%	
Registered electors		199,859		
INC hold		Swing		

=== 2014 ===
2014 Andhra Pradesh Legislative Assembly election: Repalle
Party	Candidate	Votes	%	±%
TDP	Anagani Satya Prasad	85,076	48.90	
YSRCP	Mopidevi VenkataRamana	71,721	41.22	
Majority		13,355	7.68	
Turnout		174,773	83.48	+5.50
Registered electors		209,371		
TDP gain from INC		Swing		

=== 2019 ===
2019 Andhra Pradesh Legislative Assembly election: Repalle
Party	Candidate	Votes	%	±%
TDP	Anagani Satya Prasad	89,975	48.34	
YSRCP	Mopidevi Venkataramana	78,420	42.13	
JSP	Kamatham Sambasivarao	11,761	6.3	
Majority		11,555		
Turnout		186,123	83.19	+6.2
TDP hold		Swing		

=== 2024 ===
2024 Andhra Pradesh Legislative Assembly election: Repalle
Party	Candidate	Votes	%	±%
TDP	Anagani Satya Prasad	111,129	58.85	
YSRCP	Evuru Ganesh	71,182	37.70	
INC	Mopidevi Srinivas Rao	2,841	1.50	
NOTA	None of the above	1,891	1.0	
Majority		39,947	21.15	
Turnout		1,88,832		
TDP hold		Swing		
