= Cherukupalli =

Village in Andhra Pradesh, India

Cherukupalli is a village and headquarters of Cherukupalle mandal in Bapatla district of the Indian state of Andhra Pradesh.
