= Pittalavanipalem =

- Village
- Interactive map of Pittalavanipalem
- Location in Andhra Pradesh, India
- Coordinates: 15.9686°N 80.6054°E
- Country: India
- State: Andhra Pradesh
- District: Bapatla
- Mandal: Pittalavanipalem

Government
  - Type: Panchayati raj
  - Body: Pittalavanipalem gram panchayat

Area
  - Total: 1,470 ha (3,600 acres)

Population (2011)
  - Total: 12,036
  - Density: 819/km^{2} (2,120/sq mi)

Languages
  - Official: Telugu
- Time zone: UTC+5:30 (IST)
- PIN: 522xxx
- Area code: +91–8641
- Vehicle registration: AP

Pittalavanipalem is a village in Bapatla district of the Indian state of Andhra Pradesh. It is located in Pittalavanipalem mandal of Guntur revenue division. The village is dependent on agriculture, with the Kommamuru and Poondla channels of the Krishna Western Delta system providing water for irrigation.

== Government and politics ==
Pittalavanipalem gram panchayat is the local self-government of the village. It is divided into wards and each ward is represented by a ward member. The ward members are headed by a Sarpanch.

== Education ==
As per the school information report for the academic year 2018–19, the village has a total of 20 schools. These include one government school, 15 Zilla Parishad/Mandal Parishad and 4 private schools.
