= Kavuru =

- Village
- Interactive map of Kavuru
- Location in Andhra Pradesh, India
- Country: India
- State: Andhra Pradesh
- District: Palnadu
- Mandal: Chilakaluripet

Government
  - Type: Panchayati raj
  - Body: Kavuru gram panchayat

Area
  - Total: 1,723 ha (4,260 acres)

Population (2011)
  - Total: 6,491
  - Density: 376.7/km^{2} (975.7/sq mi)

Languages
  - Official: Telugu
- Time zone: UTC+5:30 (IST)
- PIN: 522xxx
- Area code: +91–
- Vehicle registration: AP

Kavuru is a village in Palnadu district of the Indian state of Andhra Pradesh. It is the headquarters of Chilakaluripet mandal in Narasaraopet revenue division.

== Geography ==
Kavuru is situated to the northwest of the mandal headquarters, Purushothapatnam, at 16°08′N 80°07′E. It is spread over an area of 1,723 ha (4,260 acres).

== Governance ==
Kavuru gram panchayat is the local self-government of the village. It is divided into wards and each ward is represented by a ward member.

== Education ==
As per the school information report for the academic year 2018–19, the village has a total of 5 schools. These schools include 1 private and 4 Zilla/Mandal Parishad schools.

Hospitals
