= Nagaram, Bapatla district =

Nagaram
- Village
- Interactive map of Nagaram
- Location in Andhra Pradesh, India
- Coordinates: 16°0′16″N 80°43′28″E
- Country: India
- State: Andhra Pradesh
- District: Bapatla
- Mandal: Nagaram

Government
  - Type: Panchayati raj
  - Body: Nagaram gram panchayat

Area
  - Total: 724 ha (1,790 acres)

Population (2011)
  - Total: 4,824
  - Density: 666/km^{2} (1,730/sq mi)

Languages
  - Official: Telugu
- Time zone: UTC+5:30 (IST)
- PIN: 522xxx
- Area code: +91–
- Vehicle registration: AP

Nagaram is a village in Bapatla district of the Indian state of Andhra Pradesh. It is located in Nagaram mandal of Repalle revenue division.

== Governance ==
Nagaram gram panchayat is the local self-government of the village. It is divided into wards and each ward is represented by a ward member.

== Education ==
As per the school information report for the academic year 2018–19, the village has a total of 4 MPP schools.
