= Amruthalur mandal =

- Mandal
- Interactive map of Amruthalur mandal
- Location in Andhra Pradesh, India
- Coordinates: 16.117°N 80.658°E
- Country: India
- State: Andhra Pradesh
- District: Bapatla
- Headquarters: Amruthalur

Area
  - Total: 124.51 km^{2} (48.07 sq mi)

Population (2011)
  - Total: 44,713
  - Density: 359.11/km^{2} (930.10/sq mi)

Languages
  - Official: Telugu
- Time zone: UTC+5:30 (IST)

Amruthalur is a mandal in the Bapatla district in the Coastal Andhra region of Andhra Pradesh, India. Its headquarters are at Amruthalur.

== Demographics ==
Religions in Amruthalur mandal (2011)
| Religion | Percent |
| Hinduism | 94.58% |
| Islam | 4.06% |
| Christianity | 0.97% |
| Other or not stated | 0.39% |
Distribution of religions

As of 2011 census, the mandal had a population of 44,713 in 13207 households. The total population constitute, 22,123 males and 22,590 females — a sex ratio of 1021 females per 1000 males. 3,695 children are in the age group of 0–6 years, of which 1,912 are boys and 1,783 are girls — a sex ratio of 933 per 1000. The average literacy rate stands at 72.65% with 29,801 literates. Scheduled Castes and Scheduled Tribes make up 20,576 (46.02%) and 1,948 (4.36%) of the population respectively.

Languages of Amruthalur mandal (2011)
1. Telugu (96.5%)
2. Urdu (3.27%)
3. Others (0.25%)

At the time of the 2011 census, 96.48% of the population spoke Telugu and 3.27% Urdu as their first language.
