= Repalle mandal =

- Mandal
- Interactive Map Outlining mandal
- Location in Andhra Pradesh, India
- Coordinates: 16°01′02″N 80°49′46″E
- Country: India
- State: Andhra Pradesh
- District: Bapatla
- Headquarters: Repalle

Government
  - Body: Mandal Parishad
  - Tehsildar: M.Nagi Reddy

Population (2011)
  - Total: 111,989

Languages
  - Official: Telugu
- Time zone: UTC+5:30 (IST)

Repalle mandal is one of the 25 mandals in Bapatla district of the state of Andhra Pradesh, India. It is under the administration of Bapatla revenue division and the mandal headquarters are located at Repalle. The mandal is situated on the banks of Krishna River of Velanadu region and is bounded by Bhattiprolu, Nagaram and Nizampatnam mandals.

== History ==
On 1 October 1904, Guntur district was formed with eight mandals. In 1909, Repalle mandal was formed by carving out from Tenali mandal. In 1933, eleven of its villages were merged in Bapatla mandal and in 1981-82, Repalle mandal was further divided into Repalle and Pallpatla.

== Demographics ==
As of 2011 census, the mandal had a population of 111,989. The total population constitute, 54,956 males and 57,936 females —a sex ratio of 1056 females per 1000 males. 9,461 children are in the age group of 0–6 years, of which 4,824 are boys and 4,637 are girls. The average literacy rate stands at 72.99% with 74,830 literates.

== Politics ==
=== Administration ===
The mandal is under the control of a tahsildar. The present tahsildar of the mandal is M.Nagi Reddy. As of 2011 census, the mandal has 18 revenue villages and 28 gram panchayats. Repalle is the only town in the mandal.

The settlements in the mandal are listed below:

1. Aravapalle
2. Bethapudi
3. Chatragadda
4. Chodayapalem
5. Gangadipalem
6. Isukapalle (Rural)
7. Kaithepalle
8. Kamarajugadda
9. Karumuru
10. Nalluru
11. Parisapadu
12. Penumudi
13. Peteru
14. Potumeraka
15. Rajukalva
16. Repalle (M)
17. Singupalem
18. Uppudi
19. Visweswaram

Note: M-Municipality

=== Politics ===
The mandal is one of the 4 mandals under Repalle (Assembly constituency), which in turn represents Bapatla (SC) (Lok Sabha constituency) of Andhra Pradesh.

== Education ==
The mandal plays a major role in education for the rural students of the nearby villages. The primary and secondary school education is imparted by government, aided and private schools, under the School Education Department of the state. As per the school information report for the academic year 2015–16, the mandal has more than 13,889 students enrolled in over 128 schools.

== See also ==
- List of mandals in Andhra Pradesh
- Villages in Repalle mandal. In kaithepalli village is panchayethe under the villages are Ramudu pallem
