= Amruthalur =

- Village
- Interactive map of Amruthalur
- Location in Andhra Pradesh, India
- Coordinates: 16°07′3.68″N 80°39′35.5″E
- Country: India
- State: Andhra Pradesh
- District: Bapatla
- Mandal: Amruthalur

Government
  - Type: Panchayati raj
  - Body: Amruthalur Gram Panchayat

Area
  - Total: 1,499 ha (3,700 acres)

Population (2011)
  - Total: 6,524
  - Density: 435.2/km^{2} (1,127/sq mi)

Languages
  - Official: Telugu
- Time zone: UTC+5:30 (IST)
- PIN: 522325
- Area code: +91–8644
- Vehicle registration: AP 07, 39

Amruthalur is a village in Bapatla district of the Indian state of Andhra Pradesh. It is the headquarters of Amruthalur mandal in Tenali revenue division. The village forms a part of Andhra Pradesh Capital Region and is under the jurisdiction of APCRDA. It was associated with the Katragadda Zamindari in 19th century and was visited by Mahatma Gandhi. The nearby village of Govada, also in Amruthalur mandal, is home to the ancient Balakoteswara Swamy Temple dedicated to Lord Shiva, dating back to at least the 11th century and once a center for Jain, Buddhist, and Veerashaiva traditions.

== Geography ==
Amruthalur is situated to the southwest of the mandal headquarters, Amruthalur, at 16°07′3.68″N 80°39′35.5″E. It is spread over an area of 1,499 ha (3,700 acres).

== History, government and politics ==
Earlier Amruthalur was ruled by Katragadda Zamindari predominantly by Rao Sahib Katragadda Pedha Achaiah(1848–1890) followed by his elder son Katragadda Sriramullu(1873–1906) followed by his only son Katragadda Varadarajullu(1896–1960) till the zamindari system was abolished. Katragadda Varadarajullu built school in his own land in inturu(ఇంటూరు), Amruthalur mandal even Mahatma Gandhi visited this school in inturu which was later taken control by government and named it as Katragadda zilla parishad high school, drinking water wells were built by him for welfare of people, He donated his own land for people to use for graveyard purposes in 4 villages as there are no graveyards in Inturu, Rambhotlapallem, Tummalapalem surrounding areas. Katragadda Varadarajullu has also given his own 35 acres of agricultural land for 99 years lease to vinayashram through his relative Jagarlamudi Kuppuswamy Chowdary in 1933.

Later Amruthalur used to be an assembly constituency and Saranu Ramaswamy chowdary was elected member of legislative assembly

Amruthalur Gram Panchayat is the local self-government of the village. There are 14 wards, each represented by an elected ward member. The present sarpanch is vacant, elected by the ward members. The village is administered by the Amruthalur Mandal Parishad at the intermediate level of panchayat raj institutions.

== Culture ==
The village of Govada, located in Amruthalur mandal, is known for the Balakoteswara Swamy Temple dedicated to Lord Shiva, where a one to two-foot tall Shiva Lingam is worshipped. The temple draws devotees during Maha Shivaratri celebrations. This village was historically referred to as Govulavada, it dates back to at least the 11th century and was once a center of religious activity involving Jains, Buddhists, and Veerashaivas. It also played a role in the Indian freedom movement, Mahatma Gandhi visited the village in 1929 as part of his campaign to raise funds for Khadi.

== Education ==
As per the school information report for the academic year 2018–19, the village has a total of 9 schools. These include one private and 8 Zilla/Mandal Parishad.
