= Political families of Andhra Pradesh and Telangana =

Telangana and Andhra Pradesh states dynastic politics

This is a list of political families in the Indian states of Andhra Pradesh and Telangana

== Adireddy Family ==
- Adireddy Apparao, ex-MLC
- Adireddy Veera Raghavamma, first female mayor of Rajahmundry
- Adireddy Bhavani, ex-MLA Rajahmundry city
- Adireddy Srinivas, MLA (Rajahmundry City Assembly constituency)

== Alla family ==
- Alla Ayodhya Rami Reddy, Rajya Sabha member
- Alla Ramakrishna Reddy, MLA from Mangalagiri (brother of Ayodhya Rami Reddy)
- Modugula Venugopala Reddy, MP from Narasaraopet and MLA from Guntur West (brother-in-law of Ramakrishna Reddy)

== Anipireddy family ==
- Anipireddy Venkata Praveen Kumar Reddy MLA
- Anipireddy Venkata Lakshmi Devamma - MLA

== Botsa family ==
- Botsa Satyanarayana,ex-MLA from Cheepurupalli
- Botsa Jhansi Lakshmi, ex-MP from Vizianagaram (wife of Satyanarayana)
- Botcha Appalanarasayya, ex-MLA from Gajapathinagaram (brother of Satyanarayana)

== Bhuma family ==
- Bhuma Shekar Reddy, MLA from Allagadda
- Bhuma Nagi Reddy, former MP from Nandyal and former MLA from Allagadda Nandyal
- Shobha Nagi Reddy, former MLA from Allagadda (wife of Nagi Reddy)
  - Bhuma Akhila Priya, MLA from Allagadda and former cabinet minister of Andhra Pradesh (daughter of Nagi Reddy)
- Bhuma Brahmananda Reddy former MLA from Nandyal
- S. V. Subba Reddy - MLA from Pattikonda & State Minister.
- S. V. Mohan Reddy - MLA from Kurnool & MLC.

== Byreddy family ==
- Byreddy Sesha Sayana Reddy - Ex-MLA from Nandikotkur & Former State Minister
- Byreddy Rajasekhar Reddy - Ex-MLA from Nandikotkur & Former State Minister
- Byreddy Shabari - MP from Nandyal Lok Sabha constituency

== Devineni family ==
- Devineni Rajasekhar (Nehru), MLA from Kankipadu and State Minister
  - Devineni Avinash, contested from Gudivada (son of Devineni Rajasekhar (Nehru))
- Devineni Uma Maheswara Rao, MLA from Mylavaram and State Minister (cousin brother of Devineni Rajasekhar (Nehru))
- Devineni Venkata Ramana, MLA from Nandigama and State Minister (brother of Uma Maheswara Rao)

== Dharmana Family ==
- Dharmana Prasada Rao, former MLA from Srikakulam and former MLA from Narasannapeta
- Dharmana Krishna Das, former MLA from Narasannapeta (brother of Prasada Rao)

== Galla family ==
- Galla Aruna Kumari, former MLA from Chandragiri and State Minister
  - Galla Jayadev, former MP from Guntur (son of Aruna Kumari)

== Gangula Family ==
- Gangula Thimma Reddy (MLA, Allagadda assembly constituency)
- Gangula Prathap Reddy (Rajya sabha member, Lok sabha member from Nandyal, MLA from Allagadda assembly constituency)
- Gangula Prabhakar Reddy (Govt.whip, MLC, Andhra Pradesh)
- Gangula Brijendra Reddy (Nani) (MLA from Allagadda assembly constituency)

== Gouthu family ==
- Gouthu Latchanna, MP, MLA, State Minister and Opposition Leader in State Assembly
- Gouthu Syam Sunder Sivaji, former MLA from Palasa (son of Latchanna)
- Gouthu Sireesha, MLA from Palasa (daughter of Syam Sundar Sivaji)

== Ganta family ==
- Ganta Srinivasa Rao MLA, State Minister & Lok Sabha Member
- Ponguru Narayana MLC & State Minister
- Pulaparthi Ramanjaneyulu MLA from Bhimavaram (Assembly constituency).

== Gadikota family ==
- Gadikota Srikanth Reddy MLA & former Chief whip
- Gadikota Mohan Reddy MLA
- Gadikota Dwarakanth Reddy MLA
- Gadikota Rama Subba Reddy MLA

== J. C. family ==
- J.C. Nagi Reddy Rajya Sabha Member
- J. C. Diwakar Reddy - MLA, State Minister & Lok Sabha Member
- J. C. Prabhakar Reddy - MLA from Tadpatri (Assembly constituency)
- G. Deepak Reddy - MLC
- J. C. Pavan Reddy - MP Candidate
- J. C. Ashmit Reddy - MLA from Tadpatri (Assembly constituency)

== Kalvakuntla family ==
- Kalvakuntla Chandrashekar Rao, former chief minister of Telangana
  - Kalvakuntla Taraka Rama Rao, former cabinet minister of Telangana (son of Chandrashekhar Rao)
  - Kalvakuntla Kavitha, former MP from Nizamabad and MLC in Telangana (daughter of Chandrashekhar Rao)
- Thaneeru Harish Rao former cabinet minister of Telangana (nephew of Chandrashekhar Rao)
- Joginapally Santosh Kumar, Rajya Sabha member (nephew of Chandrashekhar Rao)

== Kanna family ==
- Kanna Lakshminarayana, Ex-Minister
  - Kanna Naga Raju, Ex-Mayor Guntur (son of Lakshminarayana)

== Kasu family ==
- Kasu Brahmananda Reddy, CM of Andhra Pradesh. Central Home Minister, Governor
- Kasu Venkata Reddy, Former Rajya Sabha Member (Brother of Kasu Brahmananda Reddy)
- Kasu Krishna Reddy, Minister of Andhra Pradesh
- Kasu Mahesh Reddy MLA of Gurazala (Assembly constituency)

== Kotla family ==
- Kotla Vijaya Bhaskara Reddy, Chief minister, Central Cabinet Minister
- Kotla Jayasurya Prakasha Reddy, Lok Sabha of Kurnool & Central Minister
- Kotla Sujathamma, MLA of Dhone

== Kinjarapu family ==
- Kinjarapu Yerran Naidu, Union Minister and MLA from Srikakulam
  - Kinjarapu Ram Mohan Naidu, MP from Srikakulam (son of Yerran Naidu)
  - Adireddy Bhavani, MLA from Rajahmundy City (daughter of Yerran Naidu)
- Kinjarapu Atchannaidu, MLA, Tekkali (brother of Yerran Naidu)
- Adireddy Appa Rao, MLC, East Godavari (father-in-law of Bhavani)
- Adireddy Srinivas, MLA, Rajahmundry (son-in-law of Yerran Naidu)
- Bandaru Satyanarayana Murthy ex-minister, MLA, Madugula (father-in-law of Ram Mohan Naidu)

== Kimidi family ==
- Kimidi Kalavenkata Rao MLA & State Minister
- Kimidi Ganapathi Rao MLA (brother of Kalavenkata Rao)
- Kimidi Mrunalini MLA & State Minister (wife of Ganapathi Rao)

== Kethireddy family ==
- Kethireddy Surya Pratap Reddy MLA of Dharmavaram
- Kethireddy Venkatarami Reddy MLA from Dharmavaram (son of Surya Pratap Reddy)
- Kethireddy Peddareddy MLA of Tadpatri (brother of Surya Pratap Reddy)

== Konidala Family ==
- Konidala Chiranjeevi, Founder of Praja Rajyam Party and former union cabinet minister
- Konidala Pawan Kalyan, current Deputy Chief Minister of Andhra Pradesh and founder of Janasena Party
- Konidala Nagendra Babu, General Secretary of Janasena Party

== Marri family ==
- Marri Chenna Reddy, former Chief Minister of Andhra Pradesh
- Marri Shashidhar Reddy, MLA form Sanathnagar (son of Chenna Reddy)

== Mekapati family ==
- Mekapati Rajamohan Reddy, MLA and MP
- Mekapati Goutham Reddy, former MLA from Atmakur and State Minister (son of Rajamohan Reddy)
- Mekapati Vikram Reddy, ex MLA from Atmakur (son of Rajamohan Reddy)
- Mekapati RajaGopal Reddy, MLA from Udayagiri (brother of Rajamohan Reddy)

== Nadendla Family ==
- Nadendla Bhaskara Rao, Former Chief Minister of Andhra Pradesh
  - Nadendla Manohar, incumbent State Minister & MLA from Tenali

== Nandamuri–Nara–Daggubati family ==
- Nandamuri Taraka Rama Rao, former Chief Minister of Andhra Pradesh
  - Nandamuri Harikrishna, former Rajya Sabha Member and State Minister (son of Rama Rao)
    - Nandamuri Suhasini, vice president of Telugu Desam Party (daughter of Harikrishna)
  - Nandamuri Balakrishna, MLA from Hindupur (son of Rama Rao)
  - Daggubati Purandeswari, President of Andhra Pradesh BJP, former MP, former Union Minister of State, Human Resource Development, former Union Minister of State, Commerce and Industry (daughter of Rama Rao)
- Daggubati Venkateswara Rao, former Member of Andhra Pradesh State Assembly, former Member of Parliament, former Health Minister (son-in-law of Rama Rao)
- Nara Chandrababu Naidu, current Chief Minister Andhra Pradesh and incumbent president of Telugu Desam Party (son-in-law of Rama Rao)
  - Nara Lokesh, General-Secretary of Telugu Desam Party, MLA from Mangalagiri & Cabinet Minister for Panchayat Raj & IT, Andhra Pradesh (son of Chandrababu)
- Nara Ramamurthy Naidu, former MLA from Chandragiri (brother of Chandrababu)
  - Nara Rohit (son of Nara Ramamurthy Naidu)

== P. V. family ==
- P. V. Narasimha Rao, former Prime Minister of India
- P. V. Rajeshwar Rao, former Member of Lok Sabha (son of P.V. Narasimha Rao)
- Surabhi Vani Devi, former MLC (daughter of P.V. Narasimha Rao)

== Patnam family ==
- Patnam Mahender Reddy, MLA and State Minister
- Patnam Sunitha Mahender Reddy, ZP Chairman (wife of Mahender Reddy)
- Patnam Narender Reddy, former MLA and MLC (brother of Mahender Reddy)

== Paripati family ==
- P. Janardhan Reddy, MLA & Leader of opposition
- P. Vishnuvardhan Reddy, MLA Jubilee Hills
- P. Vijaya Reddy, GHMC Corporator

== Paritala family ==
- Paritala Ravindra, MLA from Penukonda
- Paritala Sunitha, MLA from Raptadu (wife of Ravindra)
  - Paritala Sriram (son of Ravindra)

== Palavalasa family ==
- Palavalasa Rajasekharam - MLA from Vunukuru
- Palavalasa Vikranth - MLC
- Reddy Shanthi - MLA from Pathapatnam

== Pethakamsetti family ==
- Pethakamsetti Appala Narasimham, former MLA, MP(Lok Sabha) and Visakhapatnam Urban Development Authority, Ex-chairperson
  - P. G. V. R. Naidu, Member of the Legislative Assembly (India), Visakhapatnam West Assembly constituency (son of P. Appalanarasimham)

== Pusapati family ==
- Pusapati Vijayarama Gajapati Raju, former MLA and Member of Lok Sabha
  - Pusapati Ananda Gajapati Raju, former MLA, Member of Lok Sabha and state cabinet minister (son of Vijayarama Gajapati Raju)
  - Uma Gajapathi Raju, former member of Lok Sabha (former wife of Ananda Gajapati Raju)
  - Ashok Gajapathi Raju, former MLA, Member of Lok Sabha, union cabinet minister and state cabinet minister (son of Vijayarama Gajapati Raju)

== Peddireddy family ==
- P. V. Midhun Reddy - Lok Sabha Member and YCP Lok Sabha Floor Leader
- Peddireddy Ramachandra Reddy - MLA & State Minister
- Peddireddy DwarakanathReddy - MLA from Thamballapalle (Assembly constituency)
- Peddireddy Aditya Pattabi - Related to Tamil Nadu CM Korattur (Assembly constituency)

== Rayapati family ==
- Rayapati Sambasiva Rao - Lok Sabha Member and Rajhya Sabha from Guntur & Narsaraopeta
- Rayapati Srinivas - MLC

== Tanguturi family ==
- Tanguturi Anjaiah, former Chief Minister of Andhra Pradesh
- Tangaturi Manemma, MP from Secunderabad (wife of Anjaiah)

== Thangirala family ==
- Thangirala Prabhakara Rao, MLA from Nandigama
- Tangirala Sowmya, MLA from Nandigama (daughter of Prabhakara Rao)

== Ummareddy family ==
- Ummareddy Venkateswarlu, MLA, MLC, Central Minister & Opposition Floor leader in Legislative Council
- Kilari Venkata Rosaiah MLA from Ponnuru (Assembly constituency)

== Vangaveeti family ==
- Vangaveeti Mohana Ranga MLA from Vijayawada East
- Vangaveeti Ratnakumari, MLA from Vijayawada East (wife of Mohana Ranga)
- Vangaveeti Radhakrishna Jr., MLA from Vijayawada East (son of Mohana Ranga)
- Vangaveeti Shobana Chalapathi Rao, MLA from Vuyyuru (brother of Mohana Ranga)

== Yeduguri Sandinti family ==
- Yeduguri Sandinti Rajasekhara Reddy, former Chief Minister of Andhra Pradesh
- Yeduguri Sandinti Vijayamma, President of YSRCP, Former MLA from Pulivendula, (wife of Rajashekara Reddy)
- Yeduguri Sandinti Jagan Mohan Reddy, MLA from Pulivendula, former Chief Minister of Andhra Pradesh, former MP from Kadapa, and president of YSR Congress Party(son of Rajashekara Reddy)
- Yeduguri Sandinti Vivekananda Reddy, MP from Kadapa, MLA, MLC & State Minister (brother of Rajashekara Reddy)
- Yeduguri Sandinti Avinash Reddy, MP from Kadapa (cousin brother of Jagan Mohan Reddy)
- Yerram Venkata Subba Reddy, Former MP from Ongole (uncle of Jagan Mohan Reddy)
- Balineni Srinivas Reddy, MLA from Ongole, Former Cabinet Minister of Energy, Forest & Environment, Science & Technology Andhra Pradesh (brother-in-law of Subba Reddy)
- Pochimareddy Ravindranath Reddy, MLA from Kamalapuram (maternal uncle of Jagan Mohan Reddy)

== Yellareddygari family ==
- Y. Bheem Reddy - Member of Legislative Assembly from Uravakonda, Anantapur District, son-in-law of Rao Bahadur Badinehal Rangana Goud
- Y. Sivarami Reddy - son of Y Bheem Reddy, Member of Legislative Council
- Y. Bala Nagi Reddy - son of Y Bheem Reddy, Member of Legislative Assembly from Mantralayam constituency, Kurnool District
- Y. Sai Prasad Reddy - son of Y Bheem Reddy, Member of Legislative Assembly from Adoni Constituency, Kurnool District
- Y. Venkatram Reddy - son of Y Bheem Reddy, Member of Legislative Assembly from Guntakal constituency, Anantapur District
- Y. Sitarami Reddy - son of Y Bheem Reddy, Tirumala Tirupati Devasthanams Board Member
