= Yalamanchili =

Yalamanchili, Yelamanchili, or Elamanchili (Telugu: ఎలమంచిలి) is a Telugu surname. Notable people with the surname include:

- Yalamanchili Veeranjaneyulu (fl. 1999–2004), Indian politician
- Sudhakar Yalamanchili (1956–2019), American engineer
