= Narasaraopet Lok Sabha constituency =

Lok Sabha Constituency in Andhra Pradesh

Coordinates: 16.23°N 80.05°E

Narasaraopet AP-14
- Lok Sabha constituency
- Interactive Map Outlining Narasaraopet Lok Sabha constituency

Constituency details
- Country: India
- Region: South India
- State: Andhra Pradesh
- Assembly constituencies: Pedakurapadu; Chilakaluripet; Narasaraopet; Sattenapalle; Vinukonda; Gurazala; Macherla
- Established: 1952
- Total electors: 15,14,861
- Reservation: None

Member of Parliament
- 18th Lok Sabha
- Incumbent Lavu Sri Krishna Devarayalu
- Party: TDP
- Alliance: NDA
- Elected year: 2024
- Preceded by: Rayapati Sambasiva Rao

Narasaraopet Lok Sabha constituency is one of the twenty-five lok sabha constituencies of Andhra Pradesh in India. It comprises seven assembly segments and belongs to Palnadu district.

== Assembly segments ==
Narasaraopet Lok Sabha constituency comprises the following Legislative Assembly segments:

Constituency number	Name	District	Name	Party	2024 Lead
85	Pedakurapadu	Palnadu	Bhashyam Praveen	TDP	TDP
96	Chilakaluripet	Palnadu	Prathipati Pulla Rao	TDP	TDP
97	Narasaraopet	Palnadu	Chadalavada Aravinda Babu	TDP	TDP
98	Sattenapalle	Palnadu	Kanna Lakshminarayana	TDP	TDP
99	Vinukonda	Palnadu	G. V. Anjaneyulu	TDP	TDP
100	Gurazala	Palnadu	Yarapathineni Srinivasa Rao	TDP	TDP
101	Macherla	Palnadu	Julakanti Brahmananda Reddy	TDP	TDP

Source: Assembly segments of Parliamentary constituencies

== Members of Parliament ==
Year	Member	Party
1952	C. Ramaiah Chowdary	Independent
1967	Maddi Sudarsanam	Indian National Congress
1971	Maddi Sudarsanam	Indian National Congress
1977	Kasu Brahmananda Reddy	Indian National Congress
1980	Kasu Brahmananda Reddy	Indian National Congress
1984	Katuri Narayana Swamy	Telugu Desam Party
1989	Kasu Venkata Krishna Reddy	Indian National Congress
1991	Kasu Venkata Krishna Reddy	Indian National Congress
1996	Kota Saidaiah	Telugu Desam Party
1998	Konijeti Rosaiah	Indian National Congress
1999	Nedurumalli Janardhana Reddy	Indian National Congress
2004	Mekapati Rajamohan Reddy	Indian National Congress
2009	Modugula Venugopala Reddy	Telugu Desam Party
2014	Rayapati Sambasiva Rao	Telugu Desam Party
2019	Lavu Sri Krishna Devarayalu	YSR Congress Party
2024	Lavu Sri Krishna Devarayalu	Telugu Desam Party

== Election results ==
=== General Election 1989 ===
General Election, 1989: Narasaraopet
Party	Candidate	Votes	%	±%
INC	Kasu Venkata Krishna Reddy	402,289	53.26	+5.80
TDP	Pidatala Ranga Reddy	336,583	44.56	−5.31
Majority		65,706	8.70	
Turnout		755,362	66.33	−0.55
INC gain from TDP		Swing		

=== General Election 1991 ===
General Election, 1991: Narasaraopet
Party	Candidate	Votes	%	±%
INC	Kasu Venkata Krishna Reddy	349,041	52.14	−1.12
TDP	Anisetty Padmavathi	286,425	42.79	−1.77
Majority		62,616	9.35	
Turnout		669,409	58.58	−7.75
INC hold		Swing		

=== General Election 1996 ===
General Election, 1996: Narasaraopet
Party	Candidate	Votes	%	±%
TDP	Saidaiah Kota	316,360	44.28	+1.49
INC	Kasu Venkata Krishna Reddy	297,402	41.63	−9.51
NTRTDP(LP)	K. Peda Peri Reddy	47,100	6.59	
Majority		18,958	2.65	
Turnout		714,455	56.06	−2.52
TDP gain from INC		Swing		

=== General Election 1998 ===
General Election, 1998: Narasaraopet
Party	Candidate	Votes	%	±%
INC	Konijeti Rosaiah	375,815	50.22	+8.59
TDP	Saidaiah Kota	327,966	43.83	−0.45
BJP	Medikonda Kabbireddy	40,452	5.41	
Majority		47,849	6.39	
Turnout		748,282	59.58	+3.52
INC gain from TDP		Swing		

=== General Election 1999 ===
General Election, 1999: Narasaraopet
Party	Candidate	Votes	%	±%
INC	Nedurumalli Janardhana Reddy	432,266	50.27	+0.05
TDP	S.M. Laljan Basha	418,384	48.66	+4.83
Majority		13,882	1.61	
Turnout		859,857	68.10	+8.52
INC hold		Swing		

=== General Election 2004 ===
General Election, 2004: Narasaraopet
Party	Candidate	Votes	%	±%
INC	Mekapati Rajamohan Reddy	481,310	53.49	+3.22
TDP	Maddi Lakshmaiah	395,055	43.91	−4.75
BRS	Pullimamidi Narsimha Reddy	9,622	1.07	
Independent	Gontu Venkateswara Reddy	8,278	0.92	
Independent	Pulimi Venkatarami Reddy	5,519	0.61	
Majority		86,255	9.58	
Turnout		899,784	71.70	+3.60
INC hold		Swing		

=== General Election 2009 ===
General Election, 2009: Narasaraopet
Party	Candidate	Votes	%	±%
TDP	Modugula Venugopala Reddy	463,358	42.83	−1.08
INC	Balashowry Vallabhaneni	461,751	42.69	−10.80
PRP	Shaik Syed Saheb	114,924	10.62	
Majority		1,607	0.14	
Turnout		1,081,754	79.52	+7.82
TDP gain from INC		Swing		

=== General Election 2014 ===
2014 Indian general elections: Narasaraopet
Party	Candidate	Votes	%	±%
TDP	Rayapati Sambasiva Rao	632,464	49.33	+6.50
YSRCP	Alla Ayodhya Rami Reddy	597,184	46.58	
INC	Kondapalli Venkateswarlu	22,943	1.79	
Pyramid Party of India	Akki Reddy Bhimanadula	7,032	0.55	
JSP	Yeluri Srilatha	5,142	0.40	
BSP	Mekala Hanumantha Rao Yadav	4,911	0.38	
NOTA	None of the Above	5,985	0.47	
Majority		35,280	2.75	
Turnout		12,820,58	84.63	+5.11
TDP hold		Swing		

=== 2019 ===
2019 Indian general elections: Narasaraopet
Party	Candidate	Votes	%	±%
YSRCP	Lavu Sri Krishna Devarayalu	745,089	51.75	
TDP	Rayapati Sambasiva Rao	591,111	41.06	
JSP	Nayub Kamal Shaik	51,008	3.54	
BJP	Kanna Lakshminarayana	15,468	1.07	
NOTA	None of the above	13,702	0.87	
INC	Pakkala Suribabu	11,033	0.77	
Majority		153,978	10.4	
Turnout		14,40,732	86.25	
YSRCP gain from TDP		Swing		

=== 2024 ===
2024 Indian general elections: Narasaraopet
Party	Candidate	Votes	%	±%
TDP	Lavu Sri Krishna Devarayalu	807,996	53.88	
YSRCP	Anil Kumar Poluboina	6,48,267	43.23	
INC	Garnepudi Alexander Sudhakar	18,046	1.20	
Majority		1,59,729	10.65	
Turnout		15,04,877	86.68	
TDP gain from YSRCP		Swing		

== See also ==
- List of constituencies of the Andhra Pradesh Legislative Assembly
