= Yarram Venkateswarareddy =

Indian politician

Member of Legislative Assembly Andhra Pradesh
- In office 2018–2024
- Preceded by: Yalamanchili Veeranjaneyulu
- Succeeded by: Kodela Siva Prasada Rao
- Constituency: Sattenapalle

Personal details
- Political party: YSR Congress Party

Yerram reddy served as the Member of the Legislative Assembly for Tirupati constituency in Andhra Pradesh, India, between 2004 and 2014.
