= Puthumbaka Venkatapathi =

Indian politician

Member of the Legislative Assembly for Sattenapalli
- In office 1985–1999

Puthumbaka Venkatapathi served as the Member of the Legislative Assembly for Sattenapalli constituency in Andhra Pradesh, India, between 1985 and 1989. They represented the Communist Party of India (Marxist).
