= Gopireddy Srinivasa Reddy =

Indian politician (born 1969)

Member of Legislative Assembly Andhra Pradesh
- In office 2014–2024
- Preceded by: Kasu Venkata Krishna Reddy
- Succeeded by: Chadalavada Aravinda Babu
- Constituency: Narasaraopet

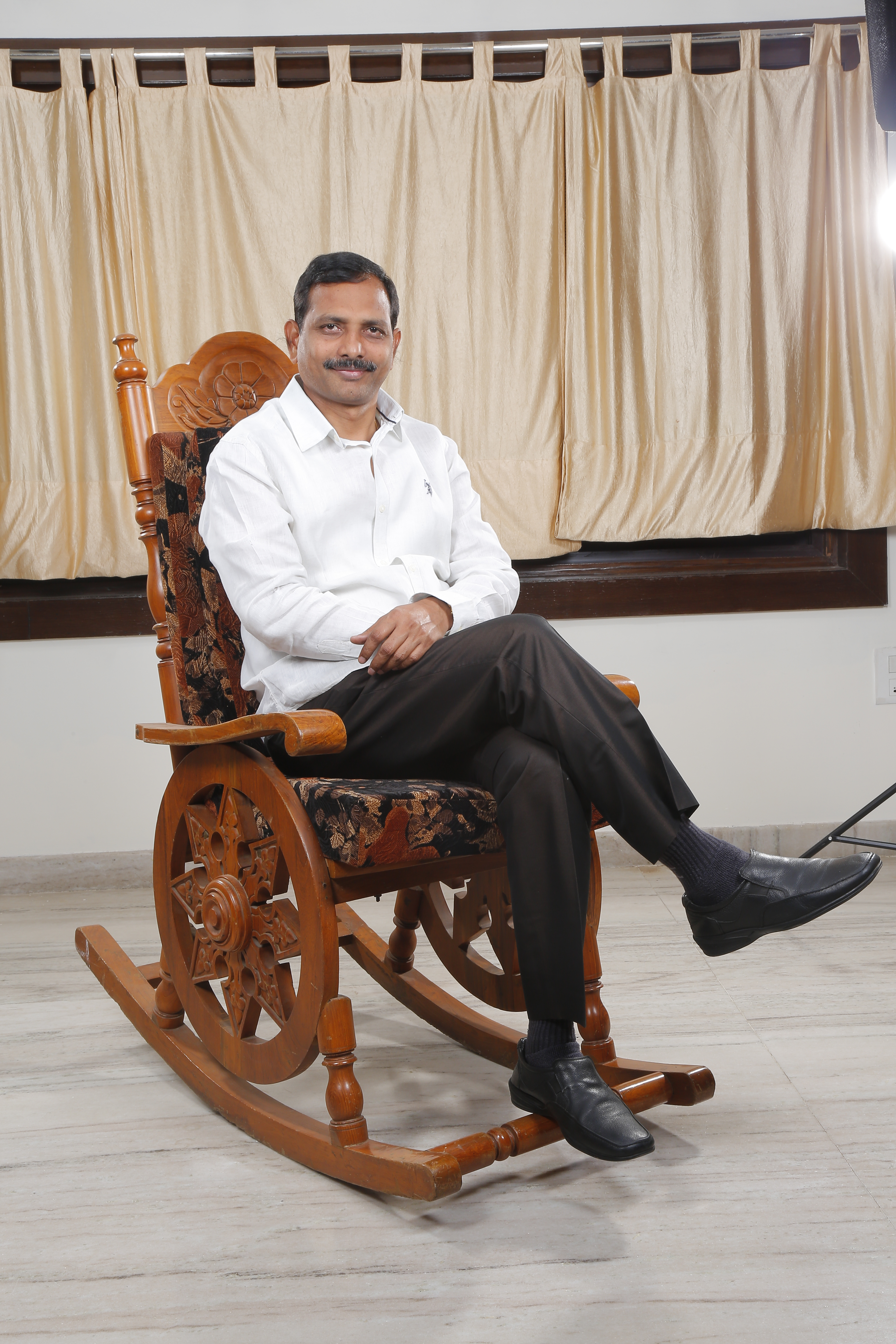
Gopireddy Srinivasa Reddy

Gopireddy Srinivasa Reddy (born 12 August 1969) is an Indian politician from Andhra Pradesh. He was a Member of the Legislative Assembly representing YSR Congress Party from Narasaraopet Assembly Constituency from 2014 to 2024. He lost the 2024 Andhra Pradesh Legislative Assembly election.

== Early life and education ==
Reddy was born to Gopireddy Venkateswara Reddy and Subbayamma in Buchipapanapalem village of Guntur district, Andhra Pradesh. He did his schooling in Korukonda Sainik School, Vizianagaram. He is a medical doctor and completed his MBBS from Andhra Medical College, Visakhapatnam and did his post graduation in Orthopaedics in 1999 from Mahe University, Manipal, Karnataka. His wife is a physiotherapist.

== Career ==
Reddy joined YSR Congress Party in 2011 and contested from Narasaraopet Constituency in the 2014 Andhra Pradesh Legislative Assembly election. He polled 87,761 votes and defeated Nalabothu Venkata Rao of Bharatiya Janata Party by a margin of 15,766 votes. He was reelected in the 2019 Andhra Pradesh Legislative Assembly Election representing YSR Congress Party. He defeated Chadalavada Aravinda Babu of TDP by a margin of 32,277 votes. However, he lost the 2024 Andhra Pradesh Legislative Assembly election from Narasaraopet constituency by a margin of 19,705 votes to Chadalavada Aravind Babu of Telugu Desam Party, this time around.
