= Dodda =

Dodda is a given name. Notable people with the name include:

- Dodda Ganesh (born 1973), Indian cricketer
- Dodda Krishnaraja I (1702–1732), the 16th maharaja of the Kingdom of Mysore
- Dodda Kempadevaraja Wodeyar I (1627–1673), the 13th maharaja of the Kingdom of Mysore
- Dodda Vira Rajendra, the ruler of the Kingdom of Coorg from 1780 to 1809
- Dodda Balakoti Reddy, Member of the Legislative Assembly for Sattenapalli constituency in Andhra Pradesh, India (1989–1994)
- Dodda Thimmaiah, Indian politician
