= Kanna Lakshmi Narayana =

Indian politician (born 1954)

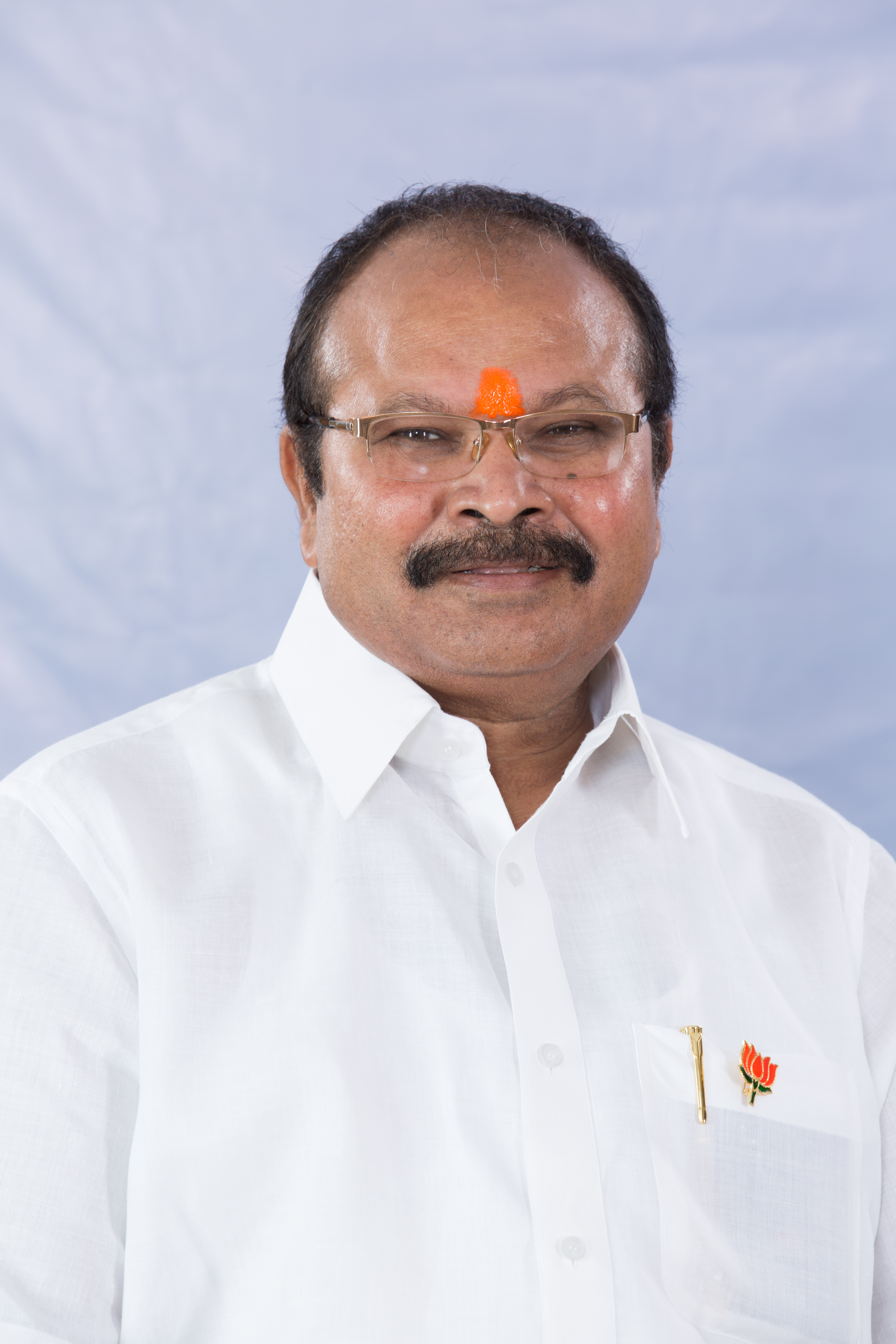

11th President of the Bharatiya Janata Party, Andhra Pradesh
- In office 13 May 2018 – 26 July 2020
- National President: Amit Shah
- Preceded by: Kambhampati Hari Babu
- Succeeded by: Somu Veerraju

Minister of Agriculture Government of Andhra Pradesh
- In office 25 November 2010 – 21 February 2014
- Governor: E. S. L. Narasimhan
- Chief Minister: Nallari Kiran Kumar Reddy
- Preceded by: Raghu Veera Reddy
- Succeeded by: Prathipati Pulla Rao

Minister for Major Industries, Food Processing, Commerce and Export Promotion Government of Andhra Pradesh
- In office 25 May 2009 – 24 November 2010
- Governor: N. D. Tiwari
- Chief Minister: Y. S. Rajasekhara Reddy; Konijeti Rosaiah
- Preceded by: J. Geeta Reddy
- Succeeded by: J. Geeta Reddy

Minister for Transport Government of Andhra Pradesh
- In office 14 May 2004 – 20 May 2009
- Governor: Surjit Singh Barnala; N. D. Tiwari
- Chief Minister: Y. S. Rajasekhara Reddy
- Preceded by: Muddasani Damodar Reddy
- Succeeded by: Pithani Satyanarayana

Member of Legislative Assembly Andhra Pradesh
- Incumbent
- Assumed office 4 June 2024
- Preceded by: Ambati Rambabu
- Constituency: Sattenapalle
- In office 16 May 2009 – 16 May 2014
- Preceded by: Constituency Established
- Succeeded by: Modugula Venugopala Reddy
- Constituency: Guntur West
- In office 28 November 1989 – 16 May 2009
- Preceded by: Kasaraneni Sadasivarao
- Succeeded by: Kommalapati Sridhar
- Constituency: Pedakurapadu

Personal details
- Born: 13 August 1954 (age 71) Guntur, Andhra State, India
- Party: Telugu Desam Party (2023 - Present)
- Other political affiliations: Bharatiya Janata Party (2014 - 2023); Indian National Congress (1989 - 2014)
- Website: ,

Kanna Lakshmi Narayana (born 13 August 1954) is an Indian politician, ex President Bharatiya Janata Party in the state of Andhra Pradesh and ex-Member of the Legislative Assembly for Guntur West constituency and ex-Cabinet Minister for Agriculture & Agriculture Technology Mission in Sri. N.Kiran Kumar Reddy's Cabinet. He joined the Telugu Desam Party on 23 February 2023 at Mangalagiri TDP's headquarters. He is currently the member of the 16th Andhra Pradesh Assembly from Sattenapalle Assembly constituency.

== Biography ==
=== Early life ===
Kanna Lakshmi Narayana was born on 13 August 1954 in Nagaram Palem, Guntur District. He was the youngest child born to Kanna Rangaiah & Kanna Masthanamma.

A successful weightlifter, Kanna Lakshmi Narayana was attracted to politics from a very young age. Hailing from a political family of Guntur, Kanna Lakshmi Narayana has since had a political career of his own, now lasting about 40 years.

Getting on his bicycle during his junior college days, Kanna Lakshmi Narayana, a B. Com. graduate, used to invite all to join NSUI by writing on the walls and, this was his way of getting initiated into politics.

Kanna Lakshmi Narayana has also competed in shooting, winning a gold medal.

=== Politics ===
In 2009 Kanna Lakshmi Narayana won the election to the State Assembly for the fifth term from Guntur West Assembly constituency; he won from Pedakurapadu Assembly constituency, the biggest constituency in Andhra Pradesh, for four straight terms, from 1989 to 2004, including the 1994 Assembly elections when only 26 Congressmen won the election.

Kanna Lakshmi Narayana was ex-President BJP party for the state of Andhra Pradesh & ex- Cabinet Minister for Agriculture & Agriculture Technology Mission, Minister for Housing in the cabinet of Hon'ble Chief Minister Kiran Kumar Reddy, and Minister of Major Industries, Food Processing, Commerce, & Export Promotion in the cabinet of Hon'ble Chief Minister Konijeti Rosaiah, having served as Transport Minister in the previous Cabinet of the late Hon’ble CM Dr. Y. S. Rajasekhara Reddy.

In 2019, he contested parliament from Narasaraopet and lost the deposit. He came 4th by receiving 1.08% of all the votes polled.

== Policies ==
Kanna Lakshmi Narayana has a progressive outlook. From the time he started his ministerial responsibilities in 1991 under N. Janardhan Reddy's cabinet till today, Narayana has worked to implement welfare and developmental programs for the weaker sections and backward classes.

=== Public services ===
Kanna Lakshmi Narayana has worked to establish Junior colleges in Krosur and Thallur in his constituency, as well as Primary Health Center buildings.

=== Safe drinking water ===
Kanna Lakshmi Narayana has also worked to resolve the health problems caused by the high fluoride content in drinking water in several villages. He secured Rs 3.50 crores of funds sanctioned for Community Protected Drinking Water Scheme for the surrounding villages of Bellamkonda and thus ensured that residents of 17 villages got protected drinking water. Apart from this he also got sanction for 300 bore wells in several villages and, protected drinking water schemes were implemented in many villages.

== Political career ==
Kanna Lakshmi Narayana won the election to the State Assembly for the fifth term from Guntur (West) Assembly constituency in 2009. He won from Pedakurapadu, the biggest constituency in Andhra Pradesh, for four straight terms, from 1989 to 2004. He joined the BJP on 27 October 2014 in Delhi in presence of Amit Shah, its national president. In 2023 February he quit BJP citing that he is unsatisfied with the BJP state unit leadership.

- 1972-1978 : President, District NSUI, Guntur.
- 1979-1985 : Worked as development officer, New India Assurance Company.
- 1986-1987 : President, City Youth Congress, Guntur.
- 1987-1988 : General Secretary, A.P. Youth Congress
- 1988-1990 : President, Guntur District Youth Congress & Labour Cell Chief Vice President INTUC District Organising Secretary, A.P. Sevadal
- 1996-1998 : General Secretary, Pradesh Congress Committee, Andhra Pradesh. Under the Stewardship of Late Dr. Mallikarjun, President.
- 2000-2003 : General Secretary, Pradesh Congress Committee, Andhra Pradesh. Under the Stewardship of Sri M. Satyanarayana Rao, President
- 1995 : Member, State Local Bodies Election Committee APCC
- 1995-1997 : Chairman, Public Accounts Committee
- 1999 : Member State Election Committee APCC
- 2004 : Member State Election Committee APCC
- 2009 : Member State Election Committee APCC

AS MEMBER OF LEGISLATIVE ASSEMBLY

- 1989-1994 : Elected from Pedakurapadu Assembly Constituency, Guntur District
- 1994-1999 : Elected from Pedakurapadu Assembly Constituency, Guntur District and as a WHIP of Congress Legislature Party
- 1999-2004 : Elected from Pedakurapadu Assembly Constituency, Guntur District
- 2004-2009 : Elected from Pedakurapadu Assembly Constituency, Guntur District
- 2009 : Elected from Guntur West Assembly Constituency
- 2024 : Elected from Sattenapalli Assembly Constituency

AS MINISTER

- 1991 - 1994 : Minister of State (Independent Charge) in the Cabinet of Sri. Nedurumalli Janardhana Reddy and Late Sri Kotla Vijaya Bhaskara Reddy
- 2004 - 2009 : Cabinet Minister in Late Dr. Y.S. Rajasekhar Reddy's Cabinet
- 2009 May : Cabinet Minister for Major Industries, Commerce & Export Promotion and Food Processing in Late Dr. Y.S. Rajasekhar Reddy's Cabinet
- 2009 September : Cabinet Minister for Major Industries, Commerce & Export Promotion and Food Processing in Sri. K. Rosaiah's Cabinet
- 2010 December : Cabinet Minister for Housing in Sri. N. Kiran Kumar Reddy's Cabinet
- 2012 February : Cabinet Minister for Agriculture & agriculture technology mission in Sri. N. Kiran Kumar Reddy's Cabinet
- 2018 - 2020 : President BJP Party for the state of Andhra Pradesh

== Personal life ==
Kanna Lakshminarayana is married to Kanna Vijaya Lakshmi. They have two sons, Kanna Naga Raju, who was the Ex-Mayor of Guntur city and Kanna Phaneendra who looks after the family business and owns a polo team which is rated as one of the top three polo teams in Asia.
