= Puthumbaka Bharathi =

Indian politician

Member of the Legislative Assembly for Sattenapalli
- In office 1994–1999

Puthumbaka Bharathi served as the Member of the Legislative Assembly for Sattenapalli constituency in Andhra Pradesh, India, between 1994 and 1999. She represented the Communist Party of India (Marxist).
