= Janga Krishna Murthy =

Indian politician

Member of Legislative Council Andhra Pradesh
- In office 30 March 2019 – 29 March 2025
- Succeeded by: Kavali Greeshma
- Constituency: Elected by MLAs'

Member of Legislative Assembly Andhra Pradesh
- In office 1999–2009
- Preceded by: Yarapathineni Srinivasa Rao
- Succeeded by: Yarapathineni Srinivasa Rao
- Constituency: Gurazala

Personal details
- Born: 4 June 1958 (age 68)
- Other political affiliations: The Indian National Congress, YSR Congress Party (2014–2024) and Telugu Desam Party

Janga Krishna Murthy (Yadav) (born 4 June 1958) is an Indian politician from Andhra Pradesh, ex-MLA from Gurazala Assembly Constituency. He was elected as Member of the Legislative Council of Andhra Pradesh from the MLA quota.

Janga Krishna Murthy resigned from the primary membership of the YSR Congress Party on 1 April 2024.

== Biography ==
Janga Krishna Murthy was born to Pedda Veerayya and Veeramma.Into a Yadava family

== Political career ==
- 1999–2009: MLA Gurazala Assembly Constituency.
- 2019–2025: MLC, MLA quota.
