= Adireddy Bhavani =

Indian politician

Member of Andhra Legislative Assembly
- In office 2019–2024
- Preceded by: Akula Satyanarayana
- Succeeded by: Adireddy Srinivas
- Constituency: Rajahmendravaram City

Personal details
- Born: 1984 or 1985 (age 41–42)
- Party: Telugu Desam Party
- Spouse: Adireddy Srinivas
- Relations: Ram Mohan Naidu Kinjarapu (brother) Atchannaidu Kinjarapu (Uncle)
- Parent: Kinjarapu Yerran Naidu (father)

== Personal life ==
Adireddy Bhavani (born 1984 or 1985, in Nimmada) is an Indian politician currently serving as a Member of the Andhra Pradesh Legislative Assembly, representing the Telugu Desam Party from the Rajahmundry City Constituency.

== Early life ==
Adireddy Bhavani is the first child of former Union Minister Kinjarapu Yerran Naidu and sister of Ram Mohan Naidu Kinjarapu. She completed her Masters of Science from IILM University. She married Adireddy Srinivas, son of Adireddy Appa Rao, a Member of Legislative Council. She is of the velama community (caste).

== Political career ==
Adireddy Bhavani contested the 2019 Andhra Pradesh Legislative Assembly election from Rajahmundry City Assembly constituency on behalf of Telugu Desam Party and won as the Member of the Legislative Assembly.
