= Gurazala Assembly constituency =

Constituency of the Andhra Pradesh Legislative Assembly, India

Coordinates: 16.55°N 79.64°E

Gurazala
- Constituency No. 100 for the Andhra Pradesh Legislative Assembly
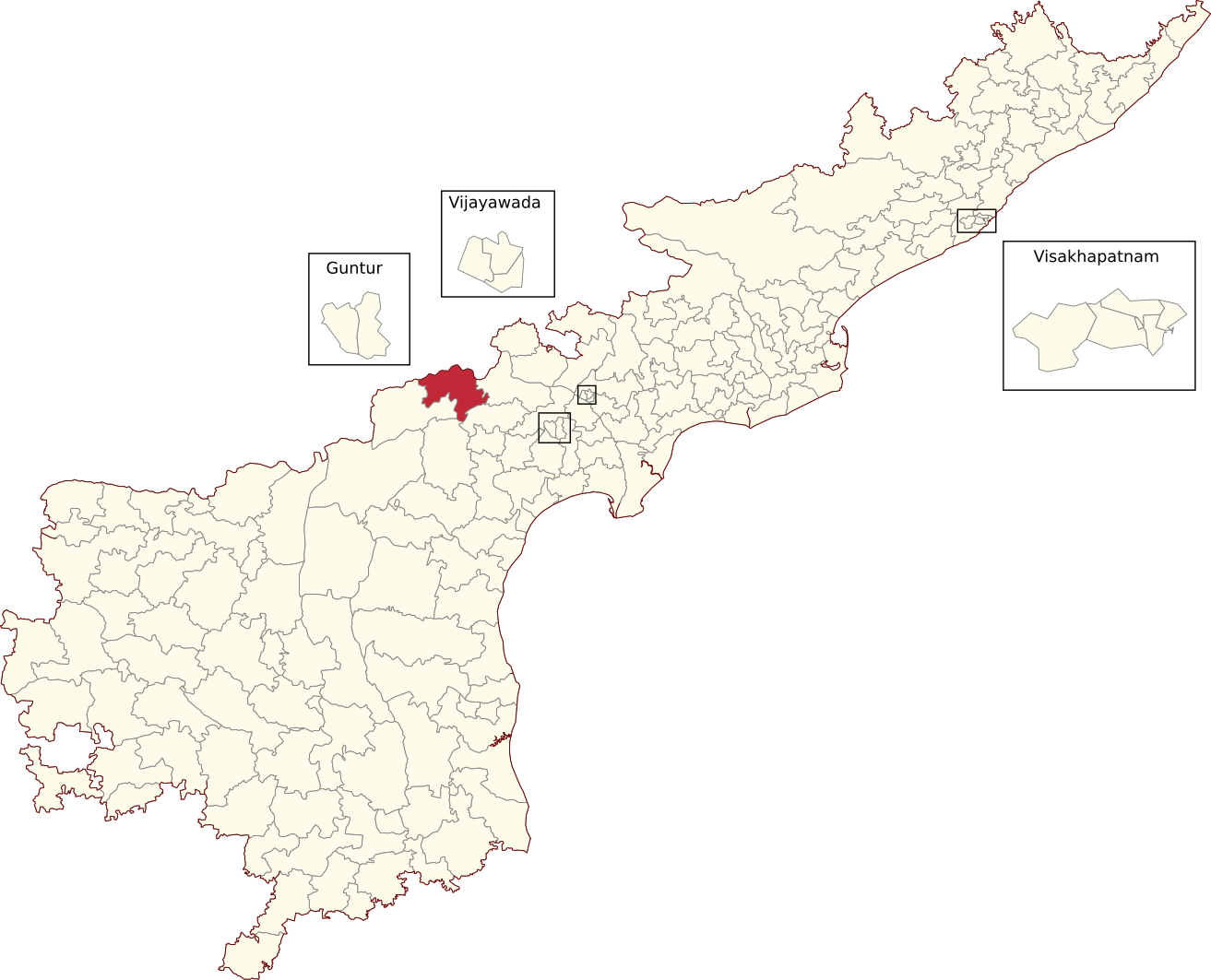
- Location of Gurazala Assembly constituency within Andhra Pradesh

Constituency details
- Country: India
- Region: South India
- State: Andhra Pradesh
- District: Palnadu
- Lok Sabha constituency: Narasaraopet
- Established: 1955
- Total electors: 268,469
- Reservation: None

Member of Legislative Assembly
- 16th Andhra Pradesh Legislative Assembly
- Incumbent Yarapathineni Srinivasa Rao
- Party: TDP
- Alliance: NDA
- Elected year: 2024

Gurazala Assembly constituency is a constituency in Palnadu district of Andhra Pradesh that elects representatives to the Andhra Pradesh Legislative Assembly in India. It is one of the seven assembly segments of Narasaraopet Lok Sabha constituency.

Yarapathineni Srinivasa Rao is the current MLA of the constituency, having won the 2024 Andhra Pradesh Legislative Assembly election from Telugu Desam Party. As of 2019, there are a total of 268,469 electors in the constituency. The constituency was established in 1955, as per the Delimitation Orders (1955).

== Mandals ==
Mandal
Gurazala
Dachepalli
Piduguralla
Machavaram

== Members of the Legislative Assembly ==
Year	Member	Political party
1955	Mandava Bapaiah Chowdary	Krishikar Lok Party
1962	Kotha Venkateswarlu	Indian National Congress
1967	Kotha Venkateswarlu	Indian National Congress
1972	Mandapati Nagireddy	Communist Party of India
1978	Gadipudi Mallikarjuna Rao	Indian National Congress (I)
1983	Julakanti Nagi Reddy	Telugu Desam Party
1985	Mutyam Anki Reddy	Telugu Desam Party
1989	Kaviti Venkata Narsi Reddy	Indian National Congress
1994	Yarapathineni Srinivasa Rao	Telugu Desam Party
1999	Janga Krishna Murthy	Indian National Congress
2004	Janga Krishna Murthy	Indian National Congress
2009	Yarapathineni Srinivasa Rao	Telugu Desam Party
2014	Yarapathineni Srinivasa Rao	Telugu Desam Party
2019	Kasu Mahesh Reddy	YSR Congress Party
2024	Yarapathineni Srinivasa Rao	Telugu Desam Party

== Election results ==
=== 2024 ===
2024 Andhra Pradesh Legislative Assembly election: Gurazala
Party	Candidate	Votes	%	±%
TDP	Yarapathineni Srinivasa Rao	128,201	55.01	
YSRCP	Kasu Mahesh Reddy	98,715	42.36	
INC	Tiyyagura Yalamanda Reddy	2,156	0.93	
NOTA	None of the above	1,888	0.81	
Majority		29,486	12.65	
Turnout		2,33,046		
TDP gain from YSRCP		Swing		

=== 2019 ===
2019 Andhra Pradesh Legislative Assembly election: Gurazala
Party	Candidate	Votes	%	±%
YSRCP	Kasu Mahesh Reddy	117,204	52.07	
TDP	Yarapathineni Srinivasa Rao	88,591	39.36	
JSP	Chintalapudi Srinivasa Rao	12,503	5.55	New
Majority		28,613	12.83	
Turnout		2,25,114	83.81	+3.20
Registered electors		268,598		
YSRCP gain from TDP		Swing		

=== 2014 ===
2014 Andhra Pradesh Legislative Assembly election: Gurazala
Party	Candidate	Votes	%	±%
TDP	Yarapathineni Srinivasa Rao	94,827	48.85%	
YSRCP	Janga Krishna Murthy	87,640	45.15%	
Majority		7,187	3.72	
Turnout		1,94,112	81.35%	
Registered electors		238,623		
TDP hold		Swing		

=== 2009 ===
2009 Andhra Pradesh Legislative Assembly election: Gurazala
Party	Candidate	Votes	%	±%
TDP	Yerapatineni Srinivasa Rao	72,250	43.58	−1.22
INC	Ala Venkateswarlu	62,229	37.53	−13.02
PRP	Gurram Gopi Sridhar	24,563	14.82	
Majority		10,021	6.05	
Turnout		165,849	78.21	+10.04
Registered electors		212,059		
TDP gain from INC		Swing		

=== 2004 ===
2004 Andhra Pradesh Legislative Assembly election: Gurazala
Party	Candidate	Votes	%	±%
INC	Janga Krishna Murthy	73,358	50.55	+2.12
TDP	Yarapatineni Srinivasarao	65,015	44.80	−3.53
Majority		8,343	5.75	
Turnout		145,147	68.17	+3.51
Registered electors		212,908		
INC hold		Swing		

=== 1999 ===
1999 Andhra Pradesh Legislative Assembly election: Gurazala
Party	Candidate	Votes	%	±%
INC	Janga Krishna Murthy	64,035	48.43%	
TDP	Yerapatineni Srinivasa Rao	63,904	48.33%	
Margin of victory		131	0.10%	
Turnout		135,969	66.49%	
Registered electors		204,508		
INC gain from TDP		Swing		

=== 1994 ===
1994 Andhra Pradesh Legislative Assembly election: Gurazala
Party	Candidate	Votes	%	±%
TDP	Yerapatineni Srinivasa Rao	62,943	51.85%	
INC	Rameshchandra Dath Kanakam	38,976	32.11%	
Margin of victory		23,967	19.74%	
Turnout		124,082	67.61%	
Registered electors		183,515		
TDP gain from INC		Swing		

=== 1989 ===
1989 Andhra Pradesh Legislative Assembly election: Gurazala
Party	Candidate	Votes	%	±%
INC	Venkata Narsi Reddy Kaviti	68,939	58.54%	
TDP	Sambasiva Rao Rachamadugu (Anumalasetty)	45,794	38.89%	
Margin of victory		23,145	19.65%	
Turnout		121,390	68.88%	
Registered electors		176,245		
INC gain from TDP		Swing		

=== 1985 ===
1985 Andhra Pradesh Legislative Assembly election: Gurazala
Party	Candidate	Votes	%	±%
TDP	Anki Reddy Mutyam	46,111	50.43%	
INC	Venkata Narsi Reddy Kaviti	42,508	46.49%	
Margin of victory		3,603	3.94%	
Turnout		92,750	68.98%	
Registered electors		134,461		
TDP hold		Swing		

=== 1983 ===
1983 Andhra Pradesh Legislative Assembly election: Gurazala
Party	Candidate	Votes	%	±%
TDP	Julakanti Nagi Reddy	39,742	53.08%	
INC	Kasu Venkata Krishna Reddy	27,020	36.09%	
Margin of victory		12,722	16.99%	
Turnout		76,232	59.70%	
Registered electors		127,689		
TDP gain from INC(I)		Swing		

=== 1978 ===
1978 Andhra Pradesh Legislative Assembly election: Gurazala
Party	Candidate	Votes	%	±%
INC(I)	Gadipudi Mallikarjuna Rao	44,652	54.58%	
CPI	Nagireddy Mandapati	21,404	26.16%	
JP	Mahammad Mohiddin	9,643	11.79%	
Independent	Kola Subba Reddy	5,151	6.30%	
Margin of victory		23,248	28.42%	
Turnout		83,809	70.91%	
Registered electors		118,197		
INC(I) gain from CPI		Swing		

=== 1972 ===
1972 Andhra Pradesh Legislative Assembly election: Gurazala
Party	Candidate	Votes	%	±%
CPI	Nagireddy Mandapati	29,659	55.82%	
INC	Kotha Venkateswarlu	21,282	40.05%	
Margin of victory		8,377	15.77%	
Turnout		54,467	58.57%	
Registered electors		92,998		
CPI gain from INC		Swing		

=== 1967 ===
1967 Andhra Pradesh Legislative Assembly election: Gurazala
Party	Candidate	Votes	%	±%
INC	Kotha Venkateswarlu	20,876	43.02%	
Independent	C.M. Gadipudi	13,799	28.44%	
Margin of victory		7,077	14.58%	
Turnout		51,222	67.14%	
Registered electors		76,291		
INC hold		Swing		

=== 1962 ===
1962 Andhra Pradesh Legislative Assembly election: Gurazala
Party	Candidate	Votes	%	±%
INC	Kotha Venkateswarlu	21,323	48.78%	
CPI	Kola Subba Reddy	16,708	38.22%	
Margin of victory		4,615	10.56%	
Turnout		45,500	62.57%	
Registered electors		72,717		
INC gain from KLP		Swing		

=== 1955 ===
1955 Andhra Pradesh Legislative Assembly election: Gurazala
Party	Candidate	Votes	%	±%
KLP	Mandava Bapaiah Chowdary	23,306	59.30%	
CPI	Kola Subba Reddy	15,219	38.72%	
Margin of victory		8,087	20.58%	
Turnout		39,301	62.07%	
Registered electors		63,317		
KLP win (new seat)				
