= Pedakurapadu Assembly constituency =

Constituency of the Andhra Pradesh Legislative Assembly, India

Coordinates: 16.47°N 80.25°E

Pedakurapadu
- Constituency No. 85 for the Andhra Pradesh Legislative Assembly
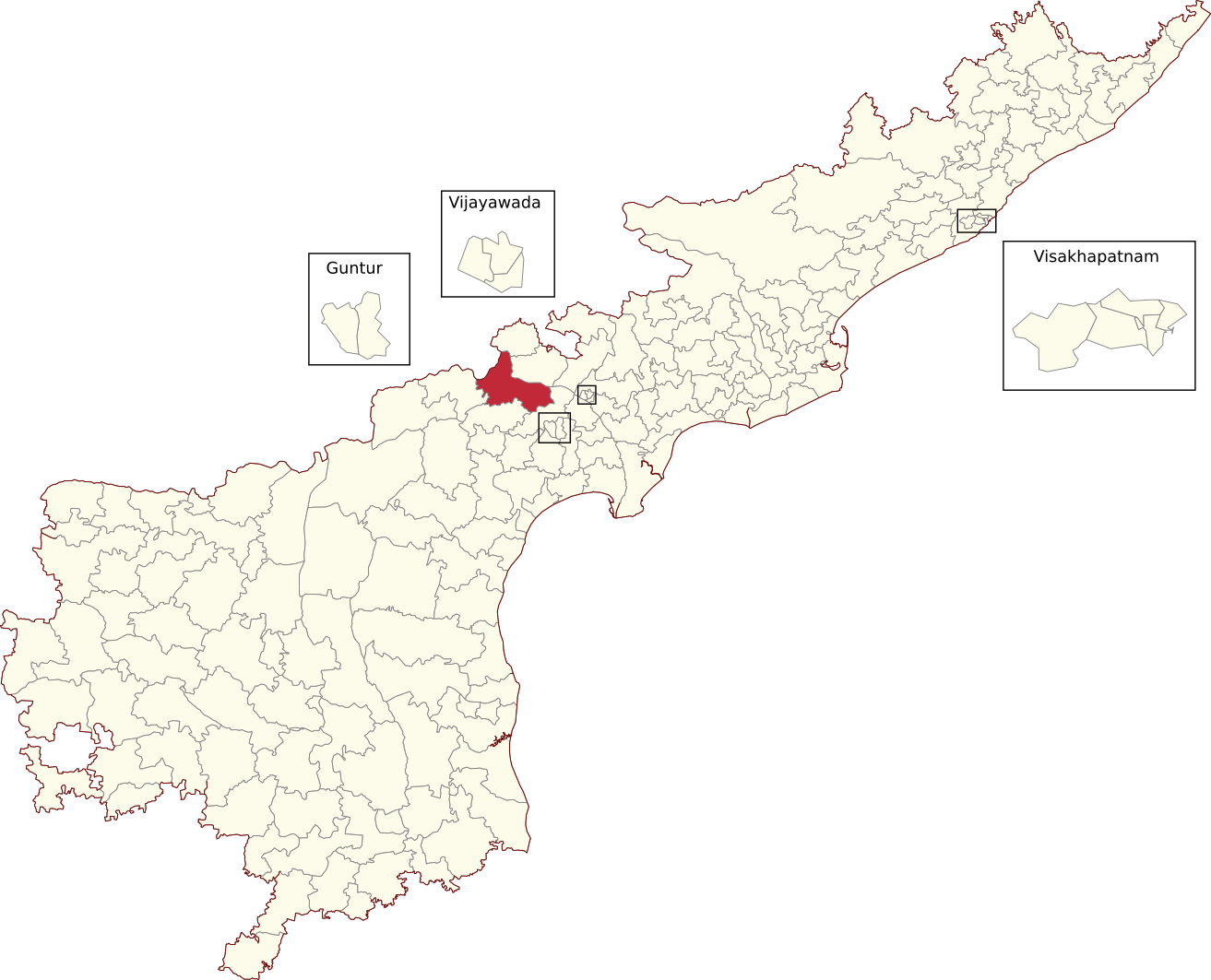
- Location of Pedakurapadu Assembly constituency within Andhra Pradesh

Constituency details
- Country: India
- Region: South India
- State: Andhra Pradesh
- District: Palnadu
- Lok Sabha constituency: Narasaraopet
- Established: 1955
- Total electors: 222,675
- Reservation: None

Member of Legislative Assembly
- 16th Andhra Pradesh Legislative Assembly
- Incumbent Bhashyam Praveen
- Party: TDP
- Alliance: NDA
- Elected year: 2024

Pedakurapadu Assembly constituency is a constituency in Palnadu district of Andhra Pradesh that elects represtatives to the Andhra Pradesh Legislative Assembly in India. It is one of the seven assembly segments of Narasaraopet Lok Sabha constituency.

Bhashyam Praveen is the current MLA of the constituency, having won the 2024 Andhra Pradesh Legislative Assembly election from Telugu Desam Party. As of 2019, there are a total of 222,675 electors in the constituency. The constituency was established in 1955, as per the Delimitation Orders (1955).

== Mandals ==
Mandal
Bellamkonda
Atchampet
Krosuru
Amaravathi
Pedakurapadu

== Members of the Legislative Assembly ==
Year	Member	Political party
1955	Ganapa Ramaswamy Reddy	Krishikar Lok Party
1962	Ganapa Ramaswamy Reddy	Indian National Congress
1967	Ganapa Ramaswamy Reddy	Indian National Congress
1972	Pathimunnisa Begam	Indian National Congress
1978	Ganapa Ramaswamy Reddy	Janata Party
1983	Allamsetti Viseswara Rao	Telugu Desam Party
1985	Kasaraneni Sadasivarao	Telugu Desam Party
1989	Kanna Lakshmi Narayana	Indian National Congress
1994	Kanna Lakshmi Narayana	Indian National Congress
1999	Kanna Lakshmi Narayana	Indian National Congress
2004	Kanna Lakshmi Narayana	Indian National Congress
2009	Kommalapati Sridhar	Telugu Desam Party
2014	Kommalapati Sridhar	Telugu Desam Party
2019	Namburu Sankara Rao	YSR Congress Party
2024	Bhashyam Praveen	Telugu Desam Party

== Election results ==
=== 2024 ===
2024 Andhra Pradesh Legislative Assembly election: Pedakurapadu
Party	Candidate	Votes	%	±%
TDP	Bhashyam Praveen	112,957	53.97	
YSRCP	Namburu Sankara Rao	91,868	43.89	
INC	Pamidi Nageswara Rao	1,290	0.62	
NOTA	None of the above	1,184	0.57	
Majority		21,089	10.08	
Turnout		2,09,298		
TDP gain from YSRCP		Swing		

=== 2019 ===
2019 Andhra Pradesh Legislative Assembly election: Pedakurapadu
Party	Candidate	Votes	%	±%
YSRCP	Namburu Sankara Rao	99,577	50.32	
TDP	Kommalapati Sridhar	85473	43.19	
Majority		14104	7.12	
Turnout		197887	88.81	−0.43
Registered electors		222,800		
YSRCP hold		Swing		

=== 2014 ===
2014 Andhra Pradesh Legislative Assembly election: Pedakurapadu
Party	Candidate	Votes	%	±%
TDP	Kommalapati Sridhar	90,310	50.33	
YSRCP	Bolla Brahma Naidu	81,114	45.21	
Majority		9,196	5.12	
Turnout		179,421	89.24	+5.36
Registered electors		201,155		
TDP hold		Swing		

=== 2009 ===
2009 Andhra Pradesh Legislative Assembly election: Pedakurapadu
Party	Candidate	Votes	%	±%
TDP	Kommalapati Sridhar	69,013	45.63	+5.22
INC	Noorjahan Pathan	59,135	39.10	−17.62
PRP	Basu Linga Reddy	14,760	9.76	
Majority		9,878	6.53	
Turnout		151,249	82.88	+9.25
Registered electors		187,999		
TDP gain from INC		Swing		

=== 2004 ===
2004 Andhra Pradesh Legislative Assembly election: Pedakurapadu
Party	Candidate	Votes	%	±%
INC	Kanna Lakshmi Narayana	76,912	56.72	+8.37
TDP	Revathi Rosaiah Doppalapudi	54,791	40.41	−5.72
Majority		22,121	16.31	
Turnout		135,591	73.63	+5.20
Registered electors		184,142		
INC hold		Swing		

=== 1999 ===
1999 Andhra Pradesh Legislative Assembly election: Pedakurapadu
Party	Candidate	Votes	%	±%
INC	Kanna Lakshmi Narayana	62,197	48.35%	
TDP	Sambasiva Reddy Venna	59,349	46.13%	
Margin of victory		2,848	2.21%	
Turnout		132,083	70.26%	
Registered electors		187,999		
INC hold		Swing		

=== 1994 ===
1994 Andhra Pradesh Legislative Assembly election: Pedakurapadu
Party	Candidate	Votes	%	±%
INC	Kanna Lakshmi Narayana	68,677	53.12%	
TDP	Sambasiva Reddy Venna	56,555	43.74%	
Margin of victory		12,122	9.38%	
Turnout		131,725	74.84%	
Registered electors		175,999		
INC hold		Swing		

=== 1989 ===
1989 Andhra Pradesh Legislative Assembly election: Pedakurapadu
Party	Candidate	Votes	%	±%
INC	Kanna Lakshmi Narayana	67,149	54.34%	
TDP	Kasaraneni Sadasivarao	55,167	44.64%	
Margin of victory		11,982	9.70%	
Turnout		127,189	72.08%	
Registered electors		176,455		
INC gain from TDP		Swing		

=== 1985 ===
1985 Andhra Pradesh Legislative Assembly election: Pedakurapadu
Party	Candidate	Votes	%	±%
TDP	Kasaraneni Sadasivarao	49,051	50.68%	
INC	Syed Mahaboob	41,222	42.59%	
Margin of victory		7,829	8.09%	
Turnout		99,598	71.91%	
Registered electors		138,513		
TDP hold		Swing		

=== 1983 ===
1983 Andhra Pradesh Legislative Assembly election: Pedakurapadu
Party	Candidate	Votes	%	±%
TDP	Viseswara Rao Allamsetti	50,700	60.39%	
INC	Ganapa Ramaswamy Reddy	29,682	35.35%	
Margin of victory		21,018	25.03%	
Turnout		85,383	66.36%	
Registered electors		128,662		
TDP gain from JP		Swing		

=== 1978 ===
1978 Andhra Pradesh Legislative Assembly election: Pedakurapadu
Party	Candidate	Votes	%	±%
JP	Ganapa Ramaswamy Reddy	45,052	49.90%	
INC(I)	Syed Mahaboob	41,757	46.25%	
INC	Fathi Munnisa Begum	1,591	1.76%	
Margin of victory		3,295	3.65%	
Turnout		92,312	71.30%	
Registered electors		129,475		
JP gain from INC		Swing		

=== 1972 ===
1972 Andhra Pradesh Legislative Assembly election: Pedakurapadu
Party	Candidate	Votes	%	±%
INC	Fathi Munnisa Begum	45,583	60.05%	
Independent	Ganapa Ramaswamy Reddy	29,063	38.29%	
Margin of victory		16,520	21.76%	
Turnout		77,441	73.10%	
Registered electors		105,937		
INC hold		Swing		

=== 1967 ===
1967 Andhra Pradesh Legislative Assembly election: Pedakurapadu
Party	Candidate	Votes	%	±%
INC	Ganapa Ramaswamy Reddy	38,228	62.12%	
CPI(M)	Pathumbaka Venkatapathi	17,709	28.78%	
Margin of victory		20,519	33.34%	
Turnout		64,289	70.75%	
Registered electors		90,874		
INC hold		Swing		

=== 1962 ===
1962 Andhra Pradesh Legislative Assembly election: Pedakurapadu
Party	Candidate	Votes	%	±%
INC	Ganapa Ramaswamy Reddy	17,720	41.38%	
CPI	Pathumbaka Venkatapathi	15,444	36.06%	
Margin of victory		2,276	5.31%	
Turnout		45,079	61.82%	
Registered electors		72,925		
INC gain from KLP		Swing		

=== 1955 ===
1955 Andhra State Legislative Assembly election: Pedakurapadu
Party	Candidate	Votes	%	±%
KLP	Ganapa Ramaswamy Reddy	24,078	57.39%	
CPI	Darsi Lakshamaiah	17,879	42.61%	
Margin of victory		6,199	14.77%	
Turnout		41,957	63.66%	
Registered electors		65,900		
KLP win (new seat)				

== See also ==
- List of constituencies of the Andhra Pradesh Legislative Assembly
