= Kommalapati Sridhar =

Indian politician

Kommalapati Sridhar (born 1965) is an Indian politician from Andhra Pradesh. He was a former two time member of the Andhra Pradesh Legislative Assembly from Pedakurapadu Assembly constituency in Guntur district representing the Telugu Desam Party.

== Early life ==
Sridhar is from Pedakurapadu, Guntur district, Andhra Pradesh. He is the son of the late Kommalapati Lakshmaiah. He completed his B.Com. at Andhra Christian College, Guntur in 1987. He runs his own business and declared assets worth Rs.1 crore in 2009 and Rs.18 crore in 2019, in his affidavits to the Election Commission of India.

== Career ==
Sridhar won from Pedakurapadu Assembly constituency in the 2014 Andhra Pradesh Legislative Assembly election representing the Telugu Desam Party. He polled 90,310 votes and defeated his nearest rival, Bolla Brahma Naidu of the YSR Congress Party, by a margin of 9,196 votes. He first became an MLA winning the 2009 Andhra Pradesh Legislative Assembly election defeating his closest opponent Noorjahan Pathan of the Indian National Congress, by a margin of 9,878 votes. He lost the 2019 election, also on TDP ticket, to Namburu Sankara Rao of the YSR Congress Party.
