= Narasaraopet Assembly constituency =

Constituency of Andhra Pradesh, India

Coordinates: 16.24°N 80.05°E

Narasaraopet
- Constituency No. 97 for the Andhra Pradesh Legislative Assembly
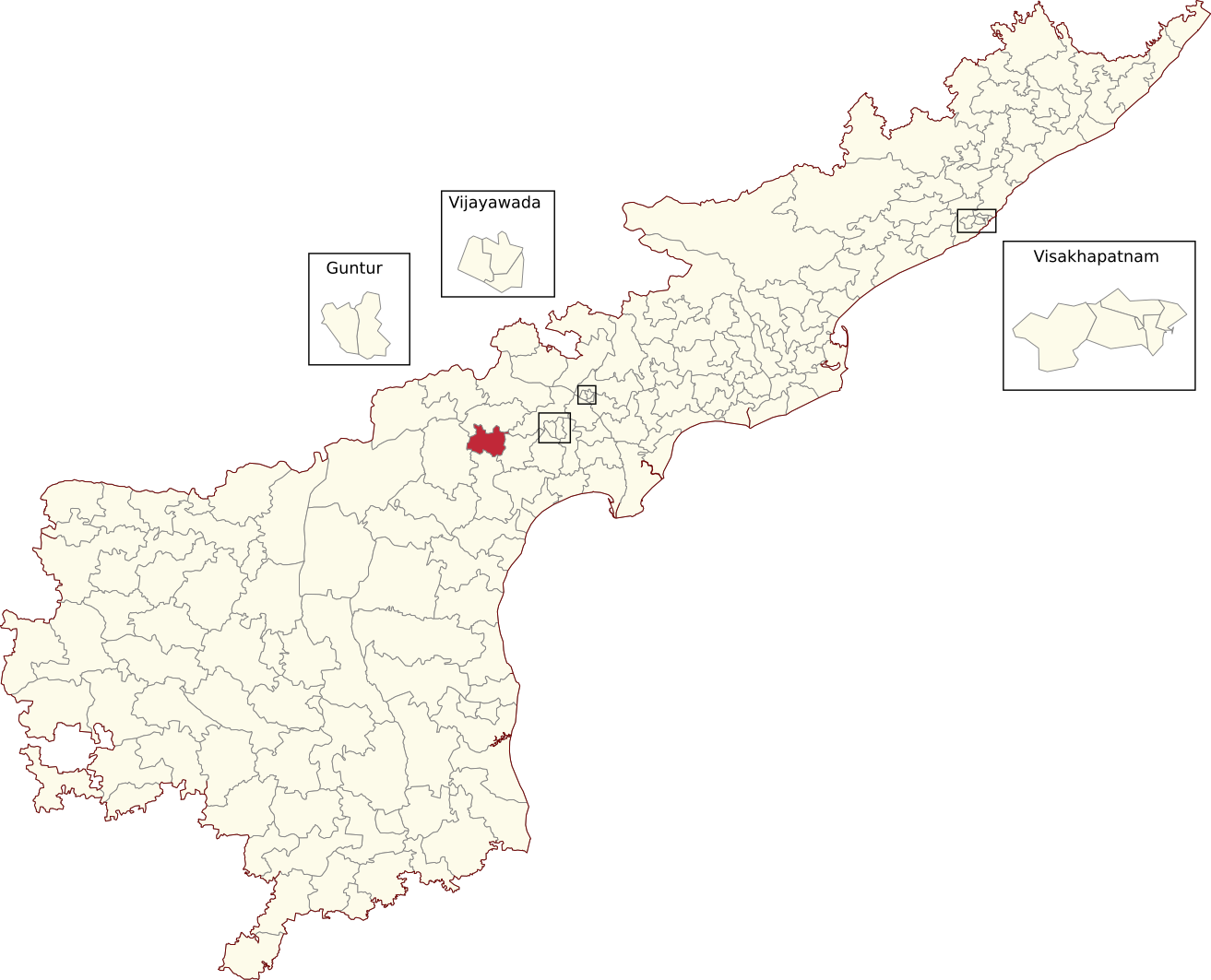
- Location of Narasaropet Assembly constituency within Andhra Pradesh

Constituency details
- Country: India
- Region: South India
- State: Andhra Pradesh
- District: Palnadu
- Lok Sabha constituency: Narasaraopet
- Established: 1951
- Total electors: 221,573
- Reservation: None

Member of Legislative Assembly
- 16th Andhra Pradesh Legislative Assembly
- Incumbent Chadalavada Arvind Babu
- Party: TDP
- Alliance: NDA
- Elected year: 2024

Narasaraopet Assembly constituency is a constituency in Palnadu district of Andhra Pradesh that elects representatives to the Andhra Pradesh Legislative Assembly in India. It is one of the seven assembly segments of Narasaraopet Lok Sabha constituency.

Chadalavada Aravinda Babu is the current MLA of the constituency, having won the 2024 Andhra Pradesh Legislative Assembly election from Telugu Desam Party. As of 2019, there are a total of 221,573 electors in the constituency. The constituency was established in 1951, as per the Delimitation Orders (1951).

== Mandals ==
Mandal
Rompicherla
Narsaraopet

== Members of the Legislative Assembly ==
Year	Member	Political party
1952	Nallapati Venkataramiah	Kisan Mazdoor Praja Party
1955	Nallapati Venkataramiah	Indian National Congress
1962	Chapalamadugu Ramaiah Chowdary	Indian National Congress
1967	Kasu Brahmananda Reddy	Indian National Congress
1972	Dondeti Krishna Reddy	Indian National Congress
1978	Kasu Venkata Krishna Reddy	Indian National Congress
1983	Kodela Siva Prasada Rao	Telugu Desam Party
1985	Kodela Siva Prasada Rao	Telugu Desam Party
1989	Kodela Siva Prasada Rao	Telugu Desam Party
1994	Kodela Siva Prasada Rao	Telugu Desam Party
1999	Kodela Siva Prasada Rao	Telugu Desam Party
2004	Kasu Venkata Krishna Reddy	Indian National Congress
2009	Kasu Venkata Krishna Reddy	Indian National Congress
2014	Gopireddy Srinivasa Reddy	YSR Congress Party
2019	Gopireddy Srinivasa Reddy	YSR Congress Party
2024	Chadalavada Aravinda Babu	Telugu Desam Party

== Election results ==
=== 1952 ===
1952 Madras State Legislative Assembly election: Narasaraopet
Party	Candidate	Votes	%	±%
KMPP	Nallapati Venkataramiah	29,486	54.21%	
INC	Kasu Vengal Reddy	24,911	45.79%	45.79%
Margin of victory		4,575	8.41%	
Turnout		54,397	68.52%	
Registered electors		79,392		
KMPP win (new seat)				

=== 1955 ===
1955 Andhra State Legislative Assembly election: Narasaraopet
Party	Candidate	Votes	%	±%
INC	Nallapati Venkataramiah	29,758	59.23%	
CPI	Karnam Ranga Rao	17,695	35.22%	
Margin of victory		12,063	24.01%	
Turnout		50,245	69.12%	
Registered electors		72,693		
INC gain from KMPP		Swing		

=== 1962 ===
1962 Andhra Pradesh Legislative Assembly election: Narasaraopet
Party	Candidate	Votes	%	±%
INC	Chapalamadugu Ramaiah Chowdary	19,676	38.28%	
SWA	Kothuri Venkateswarlu	17,020	33.11%	
Margin of victory		2,656	5.17%	
Turnout		53,120	62.36%	
Registered electors		85,187		
INC hold		Swing		

=== 1967 ===
1967 Andhra Pradesh Legislative Assembly election: Narasaraopet
Party	Candidate	Votes	%	±%
INC	Kasu Brahmananda Reddy	42,179	59.69%	
SWA	Kothuri Venkateswarlu	28,480	40.31%	
Margin of victory		13,699	19.39%	
Turnout		73,809	77.95%	
Registered electors		94,693		
INC hold		Swing		

=== 1972 ===
1972 Andhra Pradesh Legislative Assembly election: Narasaraopet
Party	Candidate	Votes	%	±%
INC	Dondeti Krishna Reddy	40,564	59.05%	
SWA	Kothuri Venkateswarlu	25,977	37.82%	
Margin of victory		14,587	21.24%	
Turnout		70,294	61.67%	
Registered electors		113,989		
INC hold		Swing		

=== 1978 ===
1978 Andhra Pradesh Legislative Assembly election: Narasaraopet
Party	Candidate	Votes	%	±%
INC	Kasu Venkata Krishna Reddy	27,387	32.12%	
JP	Kothuri Venkateswarlu	20,482	24.02%	
Margin of victory		6,905	8.10%	
Turnout		87,049	73.61%	
Registered electors		118,252		
INC hold		Swing		

=== 1983 ===
1983 Andhra Pradesh Legislative Assembly election: Narasaraopet
Party	Candidate	Votes	%	±%
TDP	Kodela Siva Prasada Rao	55,100	55.86	
INC	Buchipudi Subba Reddy	40,543	41.10	
Majority		14,557	14.76	
Turnout		99,753	74.62	
Registered electors		133,676		
TDP gain from INC		Swing		

=== 1985 ===
1985 Andhra Pradesh Legislative Assembly election: Narasaraopet
Party	Candidate	Votes	%	±%
TDP	Kodela Siva Prasada Rao	53,517	50.40	
INC	Kasu Venkata Krishna Reddy	51,453	48.45	
Majority		2,064	1.94	
Turnout		107,297	74.75	
Registered electors		143,533		
TDP hold		Swing		

=== 1989 ===
1989 Andhra Pradesh Legislative Assembly election: Narasaraopet
Party	Candidate	Votes	%	±%
TDP	Kodela Siva Prasada Rao	66,982	53.26	
INC	Mundlamuri RadhaKrishna Murthy	57827	45.98	
Majority		9,155	7.28	
Turnout		127,576	69.02	
Registered electors		184,831		
TDP hold		Swing		

=== 1994 ===
1994 Andhra Pradesh Legislative Assembly election: Narasaraopet
Party	Candidate	Votes	%	±%
TDP	Kodela Siva Prasada Rao	66,196	52.37	
INC	Dodda Balakoti Reddy	56,896	45.01	
Majority		9,300	7.36	
Turnout		128,334	69.00	
Registered electors		185,986		
TDP hold		Swing		

=== 1999 ===
1999 Andhra Pradesh Legislative Assembly election: Narasaraopet
Party	Candidate	Votes	%	±%
TDP	Kodela Siva Prasada Rao	74,089	54.69	
INC	Kasu Venkata Krishna Reddy	59,783	44.13	
Majority		14,306	10.56	
Turnout		138644	69.18	
Registered electors		200,421		
TDP hold		Swing		

=== 2004 ===
2004 Andhra Pradesh Legislative Assembly election: Narasaraopet
Party	Candidate	Votes	%	±%
INC	Kasu Venkata Krishna Reddy	79,568	54.66	
TDP	Kodela Siva Prasada Rao	64,073	44.01	
Majority		15,495	10.64	
Turnout		145,618	72.28	
Registered electors		201,466		
INC gain from TDP		Swing		

=== 2009 ===
2009 Andhra Pradesh Legislative Assembly election: Narasaraopet
Party	Candidate	Votes	%	±%
INC	Kasu Venkata Krishna Reddy	58,988	43.61	
TDP	Kodela Siva Prasada Rao	53,017	39.19	−11.05
PRP	Kapalavayi Vijaya Kumar	17,346	12.82	
Majority		5,971	4.41	
Turnout		135399	78.77	+6.49
Registered electors		171,898		
INC hold		Swing		

=== 2014 ===
2014 Andhra Pradesh Legislative Assembly election: Narasaraopet
Party	Candidate	Votes	%	±%
YSRCP	Gopireddy Srinivasa Reddy	87,761	53.13	
BJP	Nalabothu Venkata Rao	71,995	43.59	
Majority		15,766	9.58	
Turnout		165,255	84.35	
YSRCP gain from INC		Swing		

=== 2019 ===
2019 Andhra Pradesh Legislative Assembly election: Narasaraopet
Party	Candidate	Votes	%	±%
YSRCP	Gopireddy Srinivasa Reddy	100,994	55.46	+2.02
TDP	Chadalavada Aravind Babu	68,717	37.73	−6.07
JSP	Jilani Syed	8,746	4.78	
Majority		32,277	17.02	
Turnout		1,83,511	82.76	
Registered electors		221,728		
YSRCP hold		Swing		

=== 2024 ===
2024 Andhra Pradesh Legislative Assembly election: Narasaraopet
Party	Candidate	Votes	%	±%
TDP	Chadalavada Aravinda Babu	103,167	53.98	
YSRCP	Dr. Gopireddy Srinivasa Reddy	83,462	43.67	
INC	Shaik Mahaboob Basha	1,820	0.95	
NOTA	None Of The Above	1,052	0.55	
Majority		19,705	10.31	
Turnout		1,91,117		
TDP gain from YSRCP		Swing		

== See also ==
- List of constituencies of Andhra Pradesh Legislative Assembly
