= Kasu Mahesh Reddy =

Indian politician

Member of Legislative Assembly Andhra Pradesh
- In office 2019–2024
- Preceded by: Yarapathineni Srinivasa Rao
- Succeeded by: Yarapathineni Srinivasa Rao
- Constituency: Gurazala

Personal details
- Born: 9 September 1975 Narasaraopet, Guntur district, Andhra Pradesh (now Palnadu district, Andhra Pradesh)
- Party: YSR Congress Party
- Parent: Kasu Venkata Krishna Reddy (father)
- Education: LLB (1991)
- Alma mater: Andhra Christian College

Kasu Mahesh Reddy (born 9 September 1975) is an Indian politician from Andhra Pradesh. He was an MLA of YSR Congress Party from Gurazala Assembly Constituency in Guntur district. He won the 2019 Andhra Pradesh Legislative Assembly Election. He is nominated by YSR Congress Party to contest the Gurazala seat again in the 2024 Andhra Pradesh Legislative Assembly Election. He is the 3rd Generation Politician in Kasu Family.

== Early life and education ==
Reddy was born in Narasaraopet, Guntur district. His father Kasu Venkata Krishna Reddy is a former two-time MP and three-time MLA from Narasaraopet constituency. He is a grand-nephew of former Congress chief minister Kasu Brahmananda Reddy. He completed his LLB from Andhra Christian College, Guntur in 1991. He runs his own business. Kasu is the Director of KASU INFRASTRUCTURE..

== Career ==
Reddy started his political career with Indian National Congress and joined YSR Congress Party in 2016. He became an MLA for the first time winning the 2019 Andhra Pradesh Legislative Assembly Election defeating Yarapathineni Srinivasa Rao of Telugu Desam Party by a margin of 28,613 votes.
