= Kodela Siva Prasada Rao =

Indian politician (1947–2019)

Dr. Kodela Siva Prasada Rao
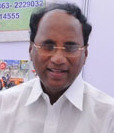

19th Speaker of the Andhra Pradesh Legislative Assembly
- In office 20 June 2014 – 12 June 2019
- Governor: E. S. L. Narasimhan
- Chief Minister: N. Chandrababu Naidu
- Preceded by: Nadendla Manohar (united andhra)
- Succeeded by: Thammineni Seetharam

Minister of Panchayat Raj and Rural Development Government of Andhra Pradesh
- In office 1997 – 1999
- Chief Minister: N. Chandrababu Naidu

Minister of Major and Medium Irrigation Government of Andhra Pradesh
- In office 1996 – 1997
- Chief Minister: N. Chandrababu Naidu
- Preceded by: Yarram Venkateswarareddy

Minister of Home Affairs Government of Andhra Pradesh
- In office 1987 – 1988
- CM: N.T. Rama Rao

Member of Legislative Assembly Andhra Pradesh
- In office 2014–2019
- Preceded by: Yarram Venkateswarareddy
- Succeeded by: Ambati Rambabu
- Constituency: Sattenapalle
- In office 1983–2004
- Preceded by: Kasu Venkata Krishna Reddy
- Succeeded by: Kasu Venkata Krishna Reddy
- Constituency: Narasaraopet

Personal details
- Born: 2 May 1947 Kandlagunta village, near Narasaropet
- Died: 16 September 2019 (aged 72) Hyderabad, Telangana, India
- Party: Telugu Desam Party
- Spouse: Kodela Sasikala
- Children: 2 Sons and a Daughter

Kodela Siva Prasada Rao (Palnati Puli) (2 May 1947 – 16 September 2019) was an Indian politician from the Telugu Desam Party and also a former Member of the Legislative Assembly from Narasaraopeta and Sattenapalle.

Beginning 2014 he served for five years as the Speaker of the first Andhra Pradesh Legislative Assembly. In a career spanning three decades, he served as a cabinet minister in the N. T. Rama Rao and N. Chandrababu Naidu governments, serving at various times as Minister of Home Affairs, Health, Major Irrigation department, Panchayat Raj and Rural Development, and Civil Supplies.

== Life and education ==
Kodela Siva Prasada Rao was born in Kandlagunta, Palnadu district, Andhra Pradesh, India on 2 May 1947. He and his wife Sasikala had three children, a daughter, and two sons.

He studied pre-university at Loyola College, Vijayawada. He graduated with a M.B.B.S. from Guntur Medical College, Guntur, and earned his MS (General Surgery) from Banaras Hindu University.

== Positions held ==
- 1983 - 1985 : Member AP LA
- 1985 - 1989 : Member AP LA
- 1989 - 1994 : Member AP LA
- 1994 - 1999 : Member AP LA
- 1999 - 2003 : Member AP LA,
- 2014 : Member AP LA - Speaker, AP LA - Chairman, Business Advisory Committee

AS MEMBER OF LEGISLATIVE ASSEMBLY

- 1983 : Elected from Narasaraopet (Assembly constituency)
- 1985 : Elected from Narasaraopet (Assembly constituency)
- 1989 : Elected from Narasaraopet (Assembly constituency)
- 1994 : Elected from Narasaraopet (Assembly constituency)
- 1999 : Elected from Narasaraopet (Assembly constituency)
- 2014 : Elected from Sattenapalle (Assembly constituency)

AS MINISTER

- 1987 - 1988: Minister for Home Affairs
- 1996 - 1997: Minister for Major & Medium Irrigation
- 1997 - 1999: Minister for Panchayat Raj
- 1999 - 2004: Health Minister
- 2014 - 2019: First Assembly speaker of Andhra Pradesh
