= Chirumamilla =

- Village
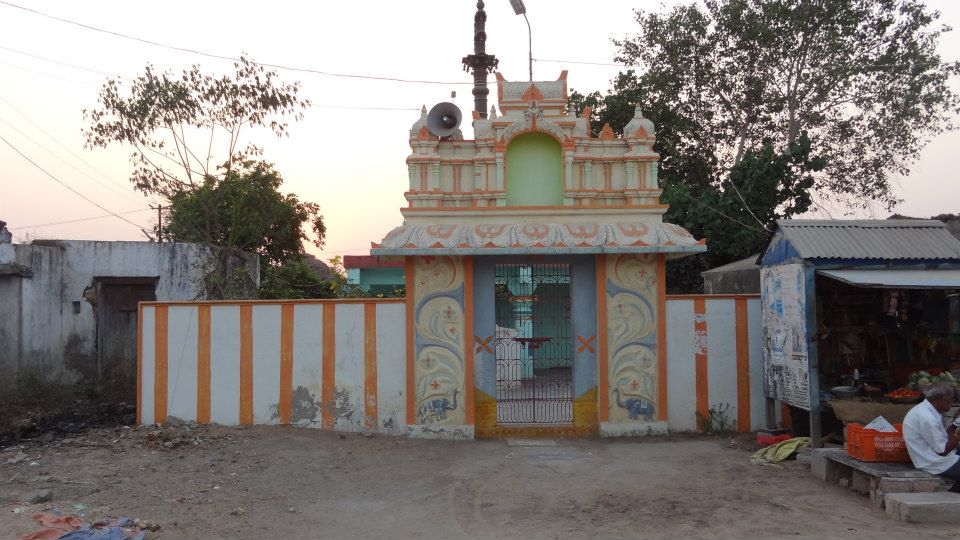
- Rama Temple
- Interactive map of Chirumamilla
- Location in Andhra Pradesh, India
- Coordinates: 16.21°N 80.19°E
- Country: India
- State: Andhra Pradesh
- District: Palnadu
- Mandal: Nadendla

Government
  - Type: Panchayati raj
  - Body: Chirumamilla gram panchayat

Area
  - Total: 841 ha (2,080 acres)

Population (2011)
  - Total: 2,896
  - Density: 344/km^{2} (892/sq mi)

Languages
  - Official: Telugu
- Time zone: UTC+5:30 (IST)
- PIN: 522234
- Area code: +91–8641
- Vehicle registration: AP

Chirumamilla is a village (Gram Panchayati) located in Nadendla Mandal, Narasaraopet revenue division, originally Palnadu district, but after district reorganization, now under Palnadu District in the Indian state of Andhra Pradesh. It is known as the hometown of famous people like Kasu Brahmananda Reddy Garu, ex. Chief Minister of United Andhra Pradesh who also serves as the Minister of Home Affairs of the Indira Gandhi cabinet as well as the Governor of Maharashtra.

== Governance ==
Chirumamilla gram panchayat is divided into wards and each ward is represented by a ward member. The total villages are represented by the Gram Sarpanch (President) and another Vice Sarpanch (Vice President).

Currently, Singareddy Bhulakshmi is represented as the Gram Sarpanch from YSRCP.

== Education ==
For the past decades, there was no proper education system available at Chirumamilla. Students could only achieve a primary education. However, in 2009, funding for a high school was granted by Shri Nadikattu Rami Reddy, who had a special interest in the village. He helped build a secondary school with help of the people of Chirumamilla. The school is known as Zilla Parishad High School and has one AP Model School.
