= Maddi Sudarsanam =

Indian parliamentarian

Member of Parliament, Lok Sabha
- In office 1967 - 1977
- Preceded by: C. Ramaiah Chowdary
- Succeeded by: Kasu Brahmananda Reddy
- Constituency: Narasaraopet

Maddi Sudarsanam (b: 1906 - d: 1994) was an Indian Parliamentarian.

He was elected to the 4th Lok Sabha and 5th Lok Sabha from Narasaraopet (Lok Sabha constituency) in 1967 and 1971 respectively as a member of Indian National Congress.
