= Lavu Sri Krishna Devarayalu =

Indian politician

Sri Krishna Devarayalu Lavu

Member of Parliament, Lok Sabha
- Incumbent
- Assumed office 23 May 2019
- Preceded by: Rayapati Sambasiva Rao
- Constituency: Narasaraopet, Andhra Pradesh

Personal details
- Born: 29 April 1983 (age 43) Pedanandipadu, Andhra Pradesh, India
- Party: Telugu Desam Party (since 2024)
- Other political affiliations: YSR Congress Party (2019-2024)
- Spouse: Koorapati Meghana (m. 2012)
- Children: Ratan Rayalu Lavu (son)
- Education: La Trobe University

Lavu Sri Krishna Devarayalu (born 29 April 1983) is an Indian politician and a parliamentarian. He previously served as the Member of 17th Lok Sabha from YSRCP and currently as the Member of 18th Lok Sabha from TDP, representing Narasaraopet. He also serves as the Vice Chairman of Vignan University.

== Early life and education ==
Krishna was born on 29 April 1983. He is the child of Lavu Rathaiah and Lavu Nirmalamma.

He studied Media studies from La Trobe University, Australia and University of California, Santa Barbara, USA.

== Political career ==
Sri Krishna Devarayalu Lavu is a first time member of parliament who contested the 2019 general elections. He won the seat by securing 51.83% of the vote and by a margin of 1,53,978 votes. He served as a member of the erstwhile Human Resources Development Standing Committee. Since 2021, he has been a member of the Committee of Public Undertakings, Committee on Education, Women, Children, Youth and Sports and Consultative Committee on Animal Husbandry, Dairying and Fisheries.

He has spoken in Parliament on a range of legislation such as The Surrogacy (Regulation) Bill, The National Medical Commission Bill, The Motor Vehicles (Amendment) Bill and The Central Universities (Amendment) Bill. He has also raised various issues in Parliament, a few being, the demand to establish a Chilli Board in Guntur and the Construction of the Varikapudisala Lift Irrigation Project in Andhra Pradesh.

On 23 January 2024, he resigned as the Member of Parliament and left YSRCP.

Lavu Srikrishna Devarayalu won 2024 Loksabha election on TDP Ticket and later he was appointed as leader of Telugu Desam Parliamentary Party.

== Electoral History ==
=== Lok Sabha ===
Year	Constituency	Party	Votes	%	Opponent	Party	Votes	%	Result	Margin	%
2019	Narasaraopet	YCP	7,45,557	51.75	Rayapati Sambasivarao	TDP	5,91,555	41.06	Won	+1,54,002	+10.69
2024	Narasaraopet	TDP	8,07,996	54.29	Anil Kumar Poluboina	YCP	6,48,267	43.56	Won	+1,59,729	+10.73
