= Bhashyam Praveen =

Indian politician

Member of the Andhra Pradesh Legislative Assembly
- Incumbent
- Assumed office 2024
- Preceded by: Namburu Sankara Rao
- Constituency: Pedakurapadu

Personal details
- Party: Telugu Desam Party

Bhashyam Praveen is an Indian politician. He is a member of Telugu Desam Party.

== Political career ==
Praveen was elected as the Member of the Legislative Assembly representing the Pedakurapadu Assembly constituency. He won the 2024 Andhra Pradesh Legislative Assembly elections. He won the elections by a margin of 21089 votes defeating Namburu Sankara Rao of the YSR Congress Party.

== Electoral performance ==
2024 Andhra Pradesh Legislative Assembly election: Pedakurapadu
Party	Candidate	Votes	%	±%
TDP	Bhashyam Praveen	112,957	53.97	
YSRCP	Namburu Sankara Rao	91,868	43.89	
INC	Pamidi Nageswara Rao	1,290	0.62	
NOTA	None of the above	1,184	0.57	
Majority		21,089	10.08	
Turnout		2,09,298		
TDP gain from YSRCP		Swing		
