= Sattenapalle Assembly constituency =

Constituency of the Andhra Pradesh Legislative Assembly, India

Coordinates: 16.40°N 80.15°E

Sattenapalle
- Constituency No. 98 for the Andhra Pradesh Legislative Assembly
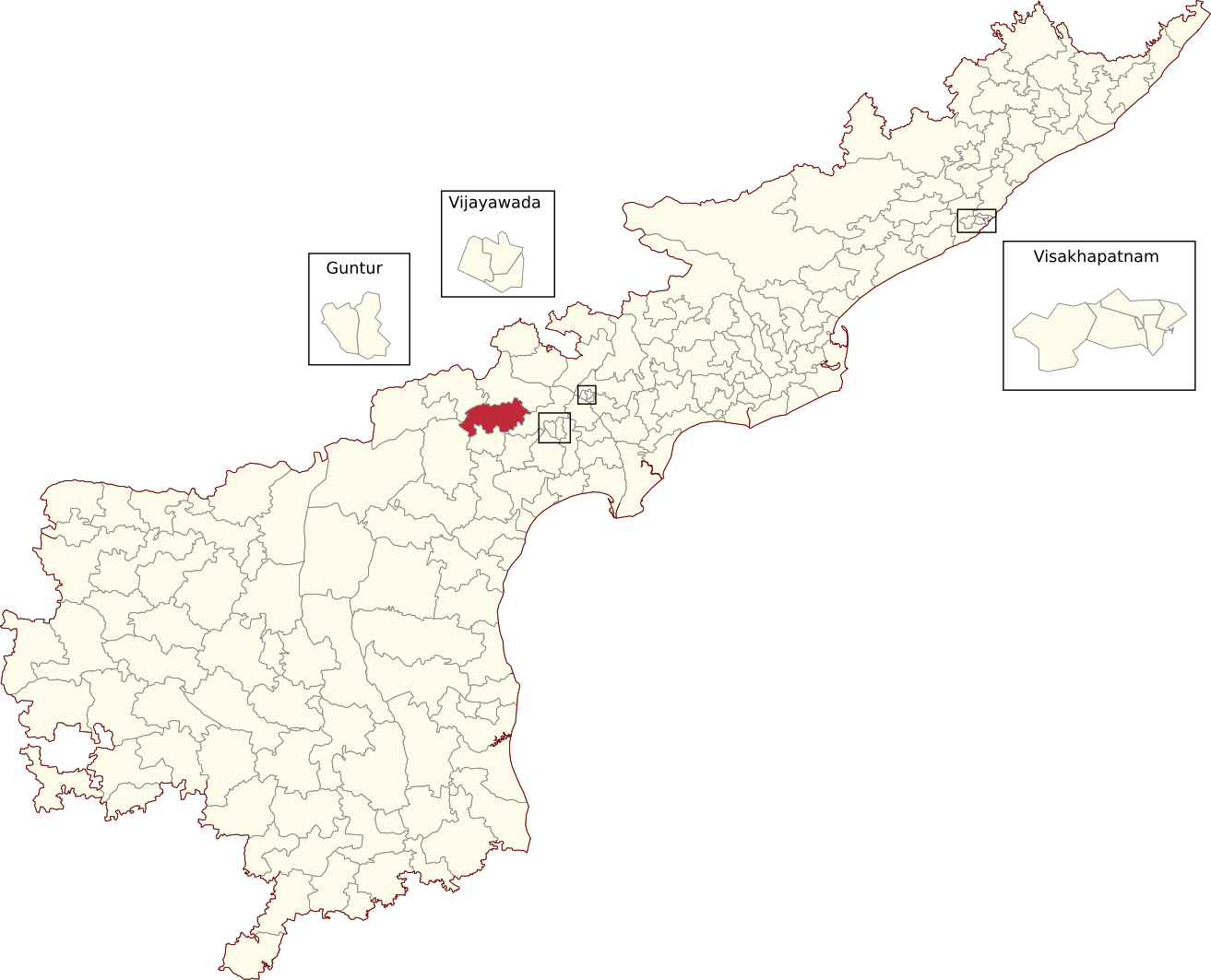
- Location of Sattenapalle Assembly constituency within Andhra Pradesh

Constituency details
- Country: India
- Region: South India
- State: Andhra Pradesh
- District: Palnadu
- Lok Sabha constituency: Narasaraopet
- Established: 1951
- Total electors: 230,775
- Reservation: None

Member of Legislative Assembly
- 16th Andhra Pradesh Legislative Assembly
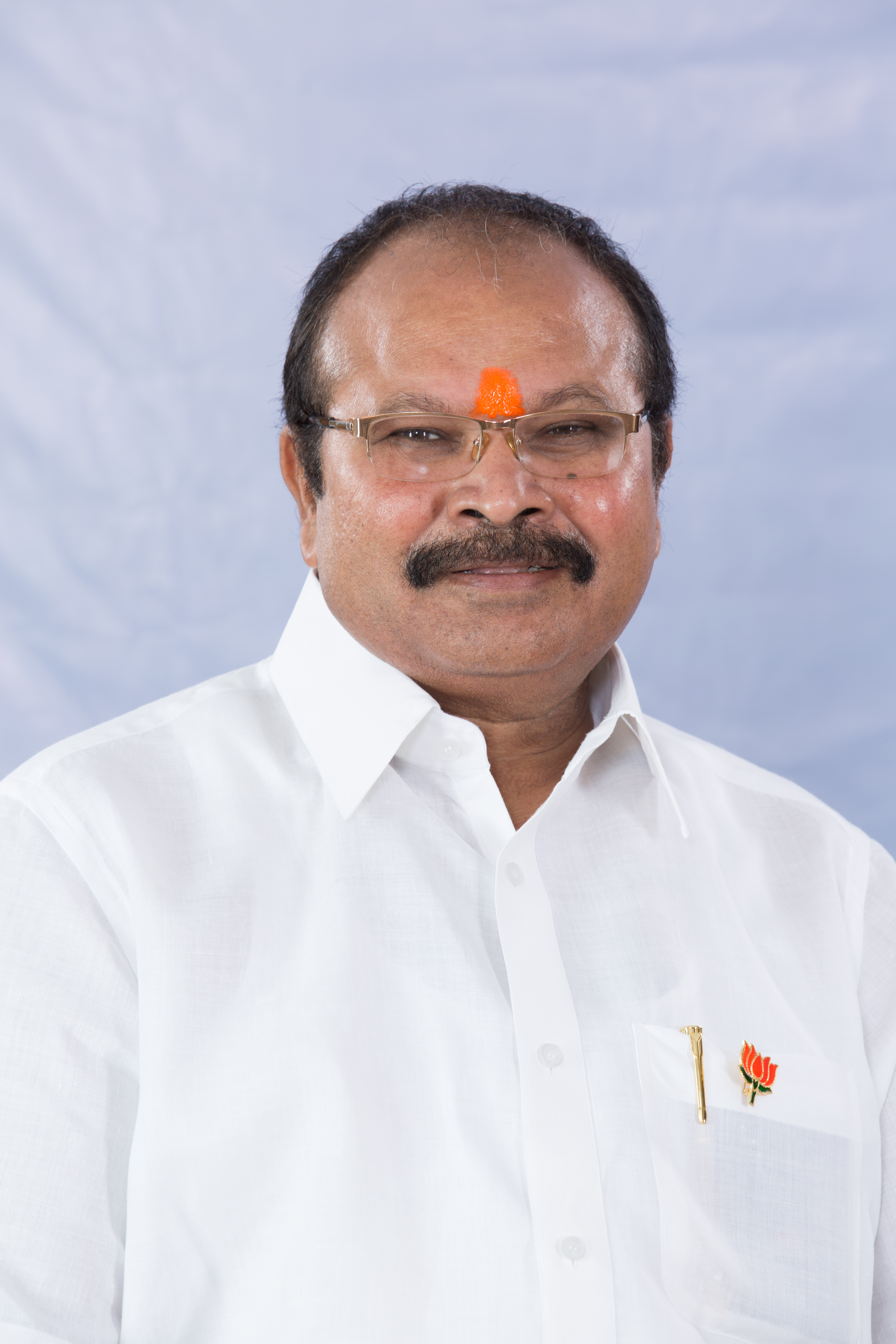
- Incumbent Kanna Lakshmi Narayana
- Party: TDP
- Alliance: NDA
- Elected year: 2024

Sattenapalle Assembly constituency is a constituency in Palnadu district of Andhra Pradesh that elects representatives to the Andhra Pradesh Legislative Assembly in India. It is one of the seven assembly segments of Narasaraopet Lok Sabha constituency.

Kanna Lakshmi Narayana is the current MLA of the constituency, having won the 2024 Andhra Pradesh Legislative Assembly election from Telugu Desam Party. As of 2019, there are a total of 230,775 votes in the constituency. The constituency was established in 1951, as per the Delimitation Orders (1951).

== Mandals ==
Mandal
Sattenapalle
Rajupalem
Nekarikallu
Muppalla

== Members of the Legislative Assembly ==
Year	Member	Political party
1952	Vavilala Gopalakrishnayya	Independent
1955	Vavilala Gopalakrishnayya	Communist Party of India
1962	Vavilala Gopalakrishnayya	Independent
1967	Vavilala Gopalakrishnayya	Independent
1972	Gade Veeranjaneya Sharma	Indian National Congress
1978	Ravela Venkata Rao	Indian National Congress (I)
1983	Nannapaneni Rajakumari	Telugu Desam Party
1985	Pathumbaka Venkatapathi	Communist Party of India
1989	Dodda Balakoti Reddy	Indian National Congress
1994	Pathumbaka Bharathi	Communist Party of India
1999	Yelamanchili Veeranjaneyulu	Telugu Desam Party
2004	Yarram Venkateswara Reddy	Indian National Congress
2009	Yarram Venkateswara Reddy	Indian National Congress
2014	Kodela Siva Prasada Rao	Telugu Desam Party
2019	Ambati Rambabu	YSR Congress Party
2024	Kanna Lakshmi Narayana	Telugu Desam Party

== Election results ==
=== 1952 ===
1952 Madras State Legislative Assembly election: Sattenapalle
Party	Candidate	Votes	%	±%
Independent	Vavilala Gopalakrishnayya	18,205	41.42%	
Independent	Jetti Ankamma	10,856	24.70%	
INC	A. Veera Reddy	9,157	20.83%	
Independent	P. Ananthaiah	3,031	6.90%	
Margin of victory		7,349	16.72%	
Turnout		43,957	68.55%	
Registered electors		64,122		
Independent win (new seat)				

=== 1955 ===
1955 Andhra State Legislative Assembly election: Sattenapalle
Party	Candidate	Votes	%	±%
CPI	Vavilala Gopalakrishnayya	19,893	49.04%	
INC	Bandaru Vandanam	19,018	46.88%	
Margin of victory		875	2.16%	
Turnout		40566	%	
Registered electors				
CPI gain from Independent		Swing		

=== 1962 ===
1962 Andhra Pradesh Legislative Assembly election: Sattenapalle
Party	Candidate	Votes	%	±%
Independent	Vavilala Gopalakrishnayya	23,611	53.37%	
INC	Meduri Nageswara Rao	18,926	42.78%	
Margin of victory		4,685	10.59%	
Turnout		45,987	62.64%	
Registered electors		73,419		
Independent gain from CPI		Swing		

=== 1967 ===
1967 Andhra Pradesh Legislative Assembly election: Sattenapalle
Party	Candidate	Votes	%	±%
Independent	Vavilala Gopalakrishnayya	30,439	50.30%	
INC	Meduri Nageswara Rao	27,996	46.26%	
Margin of victory		2,443	4.04%	
Turnout		62,598	73.01%	
Registered electors		85,741		
Independent hold		Swing		

=== 1972 ===
1972 Andhra Pradesh Legislative Assembly election: Sattenapalle
Party	Candidate	Votes	%	±%
INC	Veeranjaneya Sharma	30,223	48.79%	
Independent	Vavilala Gopalakrishnayya	29,414	47.48%	
Margin of victory		809	1.31%	
Turnout		63,098	64.71%	
Registered electors		97,512		
INC gain from Independent		Swing		

=== 1978 ===
1978 Andhra Pradesh Legislative Assembly election: Sattenapalle
Party	Candidate	Votes	%	±%
INC(I)	Ravela Venkata Rao	37,740	43.65%	
CPI(M)	Pathumbaka Venkatapathi	28,371	32.81%	
INC	Kamathamu Venkata Reddy	10,881	12.58%	
Independent	Vavilala Gopalakrishnayya	5,623	6.50%	
Margin of victory		9,369	10.84%	
Turnout		87,996	70.78%	
Registered electors		124,323		
INC(I) gain from INC		Swing		

=== 1983 ===
1983 Andhra Pradesh Legislative Assembly election: Sattenapalle
Party	Candidate	Votes	%	±%
TDP	Nannapaneni Rajakumari	46,815	54.89%	
INC	Hanumaiah Chebrolu	27,147	31.83%	
Margin of victory		19,668	23.06%	
Turnout		86,592	67.41%	
Registered electors		128,448		
TDP gain from INC(I)		Swing		

=== 1985 ===
1985 Andhra Pradesh Legislative Assembly election: Sattenapalle
Party	Candidate	Votes	%	±%
CPI(M)	Pathumbaka Venkatapathi	49,521	53.38%	
INC	J.U.Padmalatha	40,170	43.30%	
Margin of victory		9,351	10.08%	
Turnout		93,895	67.30%	
Registered electors		139,509		
CPI(M) gain from TDP		Swing		

=== 1989 ===
1989 Andhra Pradesh Legislative Assembly election: Sattenapalle
Party	Candidate	Votes	%	±%
INC	Dodda Balakoti Reddy	63,287	55.33%	
CPI(M)	Pathumbaka Venkatapathi	49,359	43.15%	
Margin of victory		13,928	12.18%	
Turnout		118,137	70.84%	
Registered electors		166,763		
INC gain from CPI(M)		Swing		

=== 1994 ===
1994 Andhra Pradesh Legislative Assembly election: Sattenapalle
Party	Candidate	Votes	%	±%
CPI(M)	Pathumbaka Bharathi	54,465	47.22%	
INC	Rayapati Srinivas	52,128	45.19%	
Margin of victory		2,337	2.03%	
Turnout		117,582	68.45%	
Registered electors		171,776		
CPI(M) gain from INC		Swing		

=== 1999 ===
1999 Andhra Pradesh Legislative Assembly election: Sattenapalle
Party	Candidate	Votes	%	±%
TDP	Yalamanchili Veeranjaneyulu	60,232	51.35%	
INC	Hanumaiah Chebrolu	49,539	42.24%	
Margin of victory		10,693	9.12%	
Turnout		119,895	66.66%	
Registered electors		179,862		
TDP gain from CPI(M)		Swing		

=== 2004 ===
2004 Andhra Pradesh Legislative Assembly election: Sattenapalle
Party	Candidate	Votes	%	±%
INC	Yarram Venkateswarareddy	74,467	58.14	+17.90
TDP	Kallam Anji Reddy	50,057	39.08	−12.27
Majority		24,410	19.06	
Turnout		128,077	73.41	+8.20
Registered electors		174,470		
INC gain from TDP		Swing		

=== 2009 ===
2009 Andhra Pradesh Legislative Assembly election: Sattenapalle
Party	Candidate	Votes	%	±%
INC	Yarram Venkateswara Reddy	61,949	41,60	−16.54
TDP	Nimmakayala Raja Narayana	54,802	36.80	−2.28
PRP	Byra Dileep Chakravarthi	25,715	17.30	
Majority		7,147	4.80	
Turnout		148,923	78.38	+4.97
Registered electors		190,005		
INC hold		Swing		

=== 2014 ===
2014 Andhra Pradesh Legislative Assembly election: Sattenapalle
Party	Candidate	Votes	%	±%
TDP	Kodela Siva Prasada Rao	85,247	48.34	
YSRCP	Ambati Rambabu	84,323	47.81	
Majority		924	0.52	
Turnout		169,570	84.85	+6.47
Registered electors		209,496		
TDP gain from INC		Swing		

=== 2019 ===
2019 Andhra Pradesh Legislative Assembly election: Sattenapalle
Party	Candidate	Votes	%	±%
YSRCP	Ambati Rambabu	105,063	51.57	3.67
TDP	Kodela Siva Prasada Rao	84,187	41.32	
JSP	Yarram Venkateswarareddy	9,279	4.55	New
Majority		20,876	10.25	
Turnout		203,731	88.18	3.33
Registered electors		231,039		
YSRCP gain from TDP		Swing		

=== 2024 ===
2024 Andhra Pradesh Legislative Assembly election: Sattenapalle
Party	Candidate	Votes	%	±%
TDP	Kanna Lakshmi Narayana	117,965	55.5	
YSRCP	Ambati Rambabu	90,129	42.4	
INC	Chukka Chandra Paul	1,580	0.74	
NOTA	None Of The Above	1,140	0.54	
Majority		27,836	13.09	
Turnout		2,12,568		
TDP gain from YSRCP		Swing		

== See also ==
- List of constituencies of Andhra Pradesh Legislative Assembly
