= Akula Satyanarayana =

Indian politician

Member of Legislative Assembly Andhra Pradesh
- In office 16 May 2014 – 21 January 2019
- Preceded by: Routhu Surya Prakasa Rao
- Succeeded by: Adireddy Bhavani
- Constituency: Rajahmundry City

Personal details
- Party: YSR Congress Party
- Other political affiliations: Janasena Party 2019-2020; Bharatiya Janata Party 2014-2019

Akula Satyanarayana is an Indian politician who is a member of the YSR Congress Party from Andhra Pradesh and former member of Bharatiya Janata Party. He has won the 2014 Andhra Pradesh Legislative Assembly election from Rajahmundry City.

He won with 79,531 votes in Assembly Election in East Godavari by a margin of 26,377 compared to his political rival Bommana Raj Kumar of YSR Congress Party. He studied in APRJC Nagarjunasagar.
