= Namburu Sankara Rao =

Indian politician

Member of Andhra Pradesh Legislative Assembly
- In office 2019–2024
- Preceded by: Kommalapati Sridhar
- Succeeded by: Bhashyam Praveen
- Constituency: Pedakurapadu

Personal details
- Born: 1968 (age 57–58) Tadikonda
- Party: YSR Congress Party
- Parent: Nageswara Rao (father)
- Occupation: Politician

Namburu Sankara Rao (born 1968) is an Indian politician from Andhra Pradesh. He is an MLA of YSR Congress Party from Pedakurapadu Assembly Constituency in Guntur district. He won the 2019 Andhra Pradesh Legislative Assembly Election.

== Early life and education ==
Rao hails from Tadikonda. He is a businessman. His father's name is Nageswara Rao, and he is a farmer. He completed his intermediate, the pre-university course from Raghuramaiah College, Narasaraopeta in 1984.

== Career ==
Rao became an MLA for the first time in 2019. He won the 2019 Andhra Pradesh Legislative Assembly Election representing YSR Congress Party by defeating Kommalapati Sridhar of Telugu Desam Party by a margin of 14,104 votes. In April 2023, he launched developmental works for a bridge on Krishna river near Madipadu village. He is also known for his Spandana programme activities where he made efforts to stop corruption among government officials. He was well received by the public during his campaign in May 2024, ahead of the Assembly elections. He also campaigned to support Anil Kumar, the party's MP candidate.
