= Adireddy Srinivas =

Indian politician

Member of Andhra Legislative Assembly
- Incumbent
- Assumed office 2024
- Preceded by: Adireddy Bhavani
- Constituency: Rajahmendravaram City

Personal details
- Party: Telugu Desam Party
- Spouse: Adireddy Bhavani
- Relations: Ram Mohan Naidu Kinjarapu (brother-in-law); Kinjaraapu Yerrannaiudu (father -in-law); Kinjaraapu Atchamnaidu (uncle); Bandaru Sathya narayana murthi(uncle)

Adireddy Srinivas is an Indian politician from Andhra Pradesh. He is a member of Telugu Desam Party.

== Political career ==
Srinivas was elected as the Member of the Legislative Assembly representing the Rajahmundry City Assembly constituency in 2024 Andhra Pradesh Legislative Assembly elections. He won the elections by a margin of 71404 votes defeating Margani Bharat of the YSR Congress Party.

== Personal life ==
Vasu was born in Rajamahendravaram. He is second child for his parents. He belongs to Velama Community (caste). He is son of Adireddy Apparao, a former member of Andhra Pradesh Legislative Council. He is married to Adireddy Bhavani the daughter of Kinjarapu Yerran Naidu. He is the brother-in-law of Kinjarapu Ram Mohan Naidu.

== Election results ==
=== 2024 ===
2024 Andhra Pradesh Legislative Assembly election: Rajahmundry City
Party	Candidate	Votes	%	±%
TDP	Adireddy Srinivas	123,291	67.69	
YSRCP	Margani Bharat	51,887	28.49	
INC	Boda Lakshmi Venkata Prasanna	1,918	1.05	
NOTA	None Of The Above	1,569	0.86	
Majority		71,404		
Turnout		1,82,151		
TDP hold		Swing		
