= Chadalavada Aravinda Babu =

Indian politician

Member of the Andhra Pradesh Legislative Assembly
- Incumbent
- Assumed office 2024
- Preceded by: Gopireddy Srinivasa Reddy
- Constituency: Narasaraopet

Personal details
- Born: 1960 (age 65–66)
- Party: Telugu Desam Party

Chadalavada Aravinda Babu (born 1960) is an Indian politician from Andhra Pradesh. He is a member of Telugu Desam Party. He has been elected as the Member of the Legislative Assembly winning the 2024 Andhra Pradesh Legislative Assembly election representing the Narasaraopet Assembly constituency in Palnadu district.

== Early life and education ==
Babu is from Narasaraopet. His father is Mohan Rao. He is a medical doctor. He did his specialisation in Orthopaedics, earning his M.S. at NTR University of Health Sciences, Vijayawada in 1992.

== Political career ==
Babu won the 2024 Andhra Pradesh Legislative Assembly election from Narasaraopet Assembly constituency representing Telugu Desam Party. He polled 103,167 votes and defeated his nearest rival, Gopireddy Srinivasa Reddy of YSR Congress Party, by a margin of 19,705 votes. Earlier he lost the 2019 Andhra Pradesh Legislative Assembly election to the same opponent from YSR Congress party by a margin of 32,277 votes.

== Electoral performance ==
2024 Andhra Pradesh Legislative Assembly election: Narasaraopet
Party	Candidate	Votes	%	±%
TDP	Chadalavada Aravinda Babu	103,167	53.98	
YSRCP	Dr. Gopireddy Srinivasa Reddy	83,462	43.67	
INC	Shaik Mahaboob Basha	1,820	0.95	
NOTA	None Of The Above	1,052	0.55	
Majority		19,705	10.31	
Turnout		1,91,117		
TDP gain from YSRCP		Swing		
