= Sudhakar Yalamanchili =

Professor of electrical and computer engineering

Sudhakar Yalamanchili (March 19, 1956 – March 23, 2019) was a professor of electrical and computer engineering at the Georgia Institute of Technology, Atlanta, GA. He was named Fellow of the Institute of Electrical and Electronics Engineers (IEEE) in 2014 for contributions to high-performance multiprocessor architecture and communication.
