= Kanna Naga Raju =

Indian politician

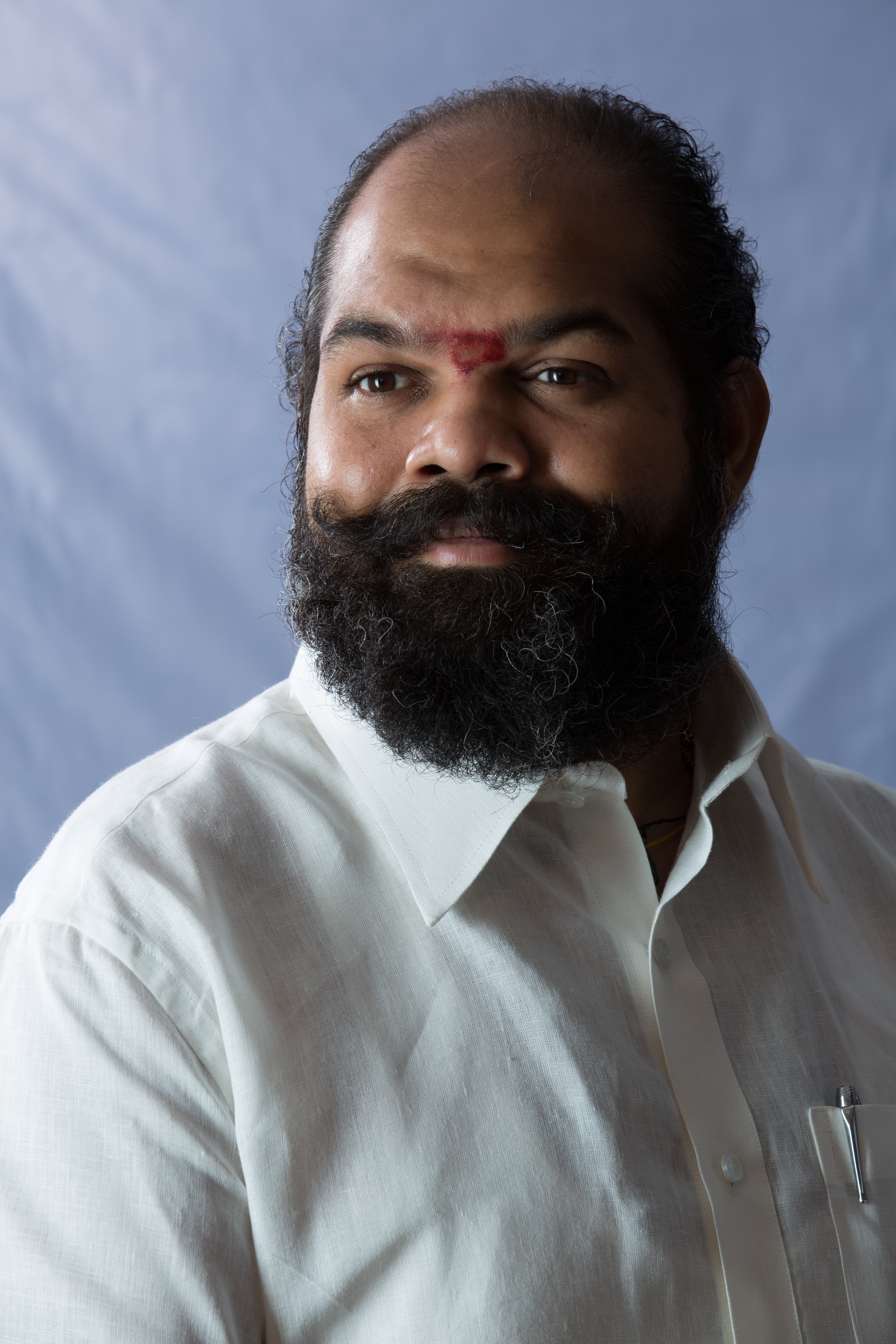
- Kanna Naga Raju

Mayor of Guntur
- In office 5 October 2005 – 30 April 2008
- Preceded by: Chukka Yesu Ratnam
- Succeeded by: Rayapati Mohan Sai Krishna

Personal details
- Party: Telugu Desam Party
- Other political affiliations: Indian National Congress
- Relations: Kanna Phaneendra (Younger brother)
- Parent(s): Kanna Lakshminarayana (father); Kanna Vijaya Lakshmi (mother)
- Occupation: Politician

Kanna Naga Raju is an Indian politician from Andhra Pradesh, Ex-Mayor of Guntur from the Indian National Congress. He is the elder son of former Minister Kanna Lakshminarayana who was five times an MLA from Andhra Pradesh. He joined the Telugu Desam Party on 23 February 2023, at Mangalagiri TDP's headquarters in the presence of party chief N. Chandrababu Naidu.

== Biography ==
Kanna Naga Raju was born to Kanna Lakshminarayana and Kanna Vijaya Lakshmi in Guntur, Andhra Pradesh.
