= Kandlagunta =

Coordinates: 16°23′N 79°18′E

- Village
- Interactive map of Kandlagunta
- Location in Andhra Pradesh, India
- Country: India
- State: Andhra Pradesh
- District: Prakasam

Languages
  - Official: Telugu
- Time zone: UTC+5:30 (IST)
- 523183: 523183

Kandlagunta is a village in Naguluppalapadu mandal in the Prakasam district of Andhra Pradesh, India.
