= Kasaraneni Sadasivarao =

Indian politician and surgeon

- Born: 13 October 1923; Takkelapadu, Guntur, Andhra Pradesh, India
- Died: 11 September 2012 (aged 88); Guntur, Andhra Pradesh, India
- Spouse: Kasaraneni Jayapradamba
- Children: 5

Kasaraneni Sadasivarao (13 October 1923 – 11 September 2012) was an Indian surgeon and politician. He hailed from Takkelapadu in Guntur district of Andhra Pradesh.

== Career ==
After the death of his wife, he retired from public life and lived in his family home in Guntur. In memory of his spouse, he started the "Dr. Jayapradamba Degree College" in Guntur, which aims to provide education at an affordable price for youngsters. He was also the founding secretary of Nagarjuna Educational Society and served as its president for a number of years which expanded under his tenure.

He was elected to Legislative Assembly of Andhra Pradesh from Pedakurapadu constituency in 1985. He was a member of Telugu Desam Party. Although Rao was a notable surgeon, he had a limited political career.

== Death ==
He died at his home on 11 September 2012.
