= Rajahmundry City Assembly constituency =

Constituency of the Andhra Pradesh Legislative Assembly, India

Coordinates: 17.00°N 81.80°E

Rajahmundry City
- Constituency No. 50 for the Andhra Pradesh Legislative Assembly
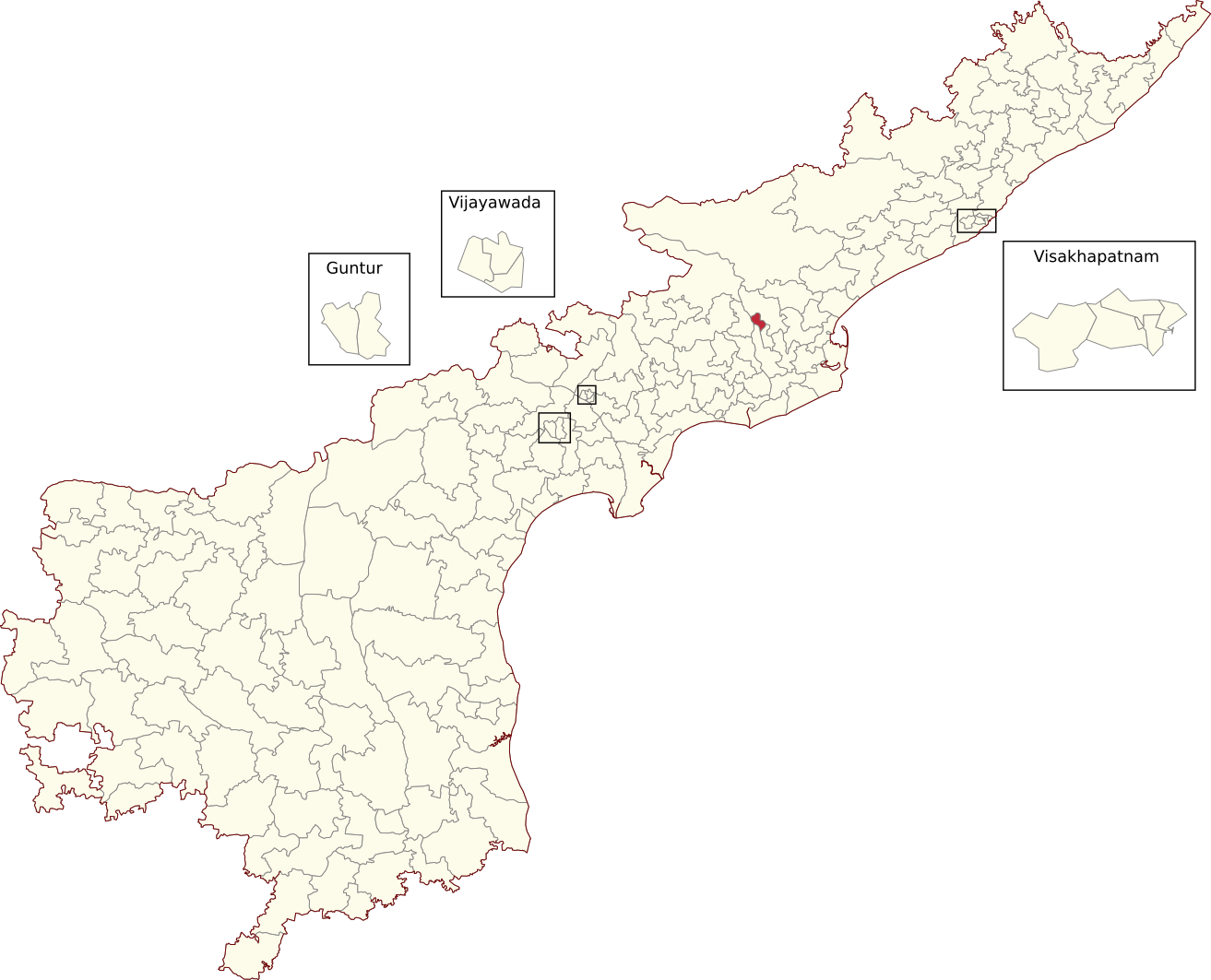
- Location of Rajahmundry City Assembly constituency within Andhra Pradesh

Constituency details
- Country: India
- Region: South India
- State: Andhra Pradesh
- District: East Godavari
- Lok Sabha constituency: Rajahmundry
- Established: 2008
- Total electors: 253,087
- Reservation: None

Member of Legislative Assembly
- 16th Andhra Pradesh Legislative Assembly
- Incumbent Adireddy Srinivas
- Party: TDP
- Alliance: NDA
- Elected year: 2024

Rajahmundry City Assembly constituency is a constituency in East Godavari district of Andhra Pradesh that elects representatives to the Andhra Pradesh Legislative Assembly in India. In 2025/early 2026 administrative reorganization which confirmed Rajamahendravaram as the permanent headquarters for the streamlined East Godavari district.It is one of the seven assembly segments of Rajahmundry Lok Sabha constituency. The constituency is formed from Wards 7 to 35 and 42 to 89 of the Rajahmundry Municipal Corporation

Adireddy Srinivas is the current MLA of the constituency, having won the 2024 Andhra Pradesh Legislative Assembly election from Telugu Desam Party. The constituency was established in 2008, as per the Delimitation Orders (2008).

== Members of the Legislative Assembly ==
| Year | Member | Political party |
|---|---|---|
| 2009 | Routhu Surya Prakasa Rao | Indian National Congress |
| 2014 | Akula Satyanarayana | Bharatiya Janata Party |
| 2019 | Adireddy Bhavani | Telugu Desam Party |
| 2024 | Adireddy Srinivas | Telugu Desam Party |

== Election results ==
=== 2024 ===
2024 Andhra Pradesh Legislative Assembly election: Rajahmundry City
| Party | Candidate | Votes | % | ±% |
|---|---|---|---|---|
| TDP | Adireddy Srinivas | 123,291 | 67.69 | |
| YSRCP | Margani Bharat | 51,887 | 28.49 | |
| INC | Boda Lakshmi Venkata Prasanna | 1,918 | 1.05 | |
| NOTA | None Of The Above | 1,569 | 0.86 | |
| Majority | | 71,404 | 39.2 | |
| Turnout | | 1,82,151 | | |
| TDP hold | | Swing | | |

=== 2019 ===
2019 Andhra Pradesh Legislative Assembly election: Rajahmundry City
| Party | Candidate | Votes | % | ±% |
|---|---|---|---|---|
| TDP | Adireddy Bhavani | 83,702 | 49.94 | |
| YSRCP | Routu Surya Prakasa Rao | 53,637 | 32.00 | −1.57 |
| JSP | Atthi Satyanarayana | 23,096 | 13.78 | |
| BJP | Bommula Dattu | 3,003 | 1.79 | −48.45 |
| NOTA | None of the above | 1,369 | 0.82 | N/A |
| Majority | | 30,065 | 18.50 | 1.83 |
| Turnout | | 1,67,604 | 66.34 | −2.60 |
| TDP gain from BJP | | Swing | | |

=== 2014 ===
2014 Andhra Pradesh Legislative Assembly election: Rajahmundry City
| Party | Candidate | Votes | % | ±% |
|---|---|---|---|---|
| BJP | Akula Satyanarayana | 79,531 | 50.24 | |
| YSRCP | Bommana Raj Kumar | 53,154 | 33.57 | |
| Majority | | 26,377 | 16.67 | |
| Turnout | | 158,317 | 68.94 | +3.30 |
| BJP gain from INC | | Swing | | |

=== 2009 ===
2009 Andhra Pradesh Legislative Assembly election: Rajahmundry City
| Party | Candidate | Votes | % | ±% |
|---|---|---|---|---|
| INC | Routu Surya Prakasa Rao | 41,369 | 31.12 | |
| TDP | Gorantla Butchaiah Chowdary | 40,085 | 30.16 | |
| PRP | Challa Sankara Rao | 39,384 | 29.63 | |
| Majority | | 1,284 | 0.96 | |
| Turnout | | 132,926 | 65.64 | |
| INC win (new seat) | | | | |

== Development ==
In 2025 and early 2026, the constituency saw significant investment in higher education and riverfront infrastructure. Specifically, ₹6.3 crore was allocated for new academic buildings at the Government Arts College (Autonomous) and major renovations were launched for the Godavari river ghats in preparation for the 2027 Godavari Pushkarams.

== See also ==
- List of constituencies of the Andhra Pradesh Legislative Assembly
