= Kasu Brahmananda Reddy =

Politician from Andhra Pradesh (1909–1994)

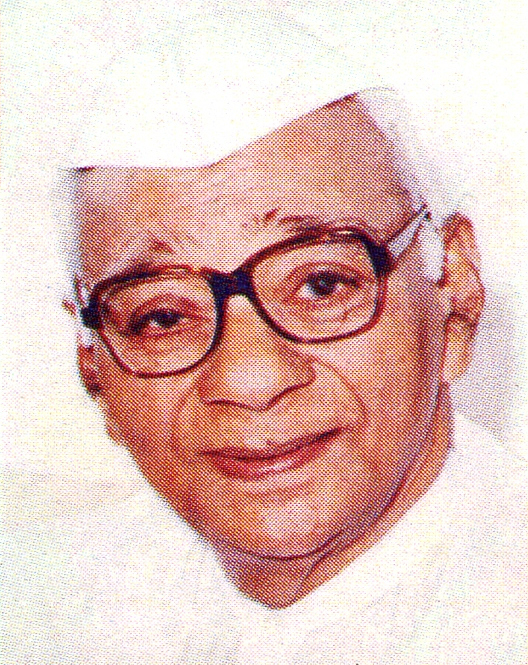

3rd Chief Minister of Andhra Pradesh
- In office 21 February 1964 – 30 September 1971
- Governor: Pattom Thanu Pillai; Khandubhai Kasanji Desai
- Deputy Chief Minister: J. V. Narsing Rao (1967-1971)
- Preceded by: Neelam Sanjiva Reddy
- Succeeded by: P. V. Narasimha Rao

11th Union Minister of Home Affairs
- In office 10 October 1974 – 12 March 1977
- Prime Minister: Indira Gandhi
- Preceded by: Uma Shankar Dikshit
- Succeeded by: Charan Singh

11th Governor of Maharashtra
- In office 20 February 1988 – 18 January 1990
- Chief Minister: Shankarrao Chavan; Sharad Pawar
- Preceded by: Shankar Dayal Sharma
- Succeeded by: Chidambaram Subramaniam

20th Union Minister of Industry
- In office 30 July 1979 – 27 November 1979
- Prime Minister: Charan Singh
- Preceded by: K. C. Pant
- Succeeded by: T. A. Pai

President of Indian National Congress
- In office June 1977 – January 1978
- Preceded by: Devakanta Barua
- Succeeded by: Indira Gandhi

Member of Parliament, Lok Sabha
- In office 1977–1984
- Preceded by: Maddi Sudarsanam
- Succeeded by: Katuri Narayana Swamy
- Constituency: Narasaraopet

10th Union Minister of Communications
- In office 11 January 1974 – 10 October 1974
- Prime Minister: Indira Gandhi
- Preceded by: Raj Bahadur
- Succeeded by: Shankar Dayal Sharma

Member of Legislative Assembly Andhra Pradesh
- In office 1967–1972
- Preceded by: Chapalamadugu Ramaiah Chowdary
- Succeeded by: Dondeti Krishna Reddy
- Constituency: Narasaraopet
- In office 1956–1967
- Preceded by: Andhra Pradesh Assembly Created
- Succeeded by: Constituency Dissolved
- Constituency: Phirangipuram

Member of Legislative Assembly Andhra State
- In office 1955–1956
- Preceded by: Chandramouli
- Succeeded by: Andhra State Assembly Dissolved
- Constituency: Phirangipuram

Personal details
- Born: 28 July 1909 Chirumamilla, Guntur district, Madras Presidency, British India (now in Chirumamilla, Palnadu district, Andhra Pradesh, India)
- Died: 20 May 1994 (aged 84) Hyderabad, Andhra Pradesh (now in Telangana, India)
- Party: Indian National Congress
- Spouse: Kasu Raghavamma
- Relatives: Kasu Venkat Reddy (brother); Kasu Venkata Krishna Reddy (Nephew); Kasu Mahesh Reddy (Grand Nephew)

Kasu Brahmananda Reddy (28 July 1909 – 20 May 1994) was the Chief Minister of Andhra Pradesh, India, from 29 February 1964 to 30 September 1971. On 3 June 1977, he was elected president of the Indian National Congress.

== Early life ==
Kasu Brahmananda Reddy was born in Chirumamilla in Guntur district, British India
(now in Palnadu district, Andhra Pradesh, India). His early education took place in Guntur and he graduated from Madras Presidency College. He also studied in Kerala. He practised law and was a very successful advocate. He married Raghavamma. Reddy had no children.

== Career ==
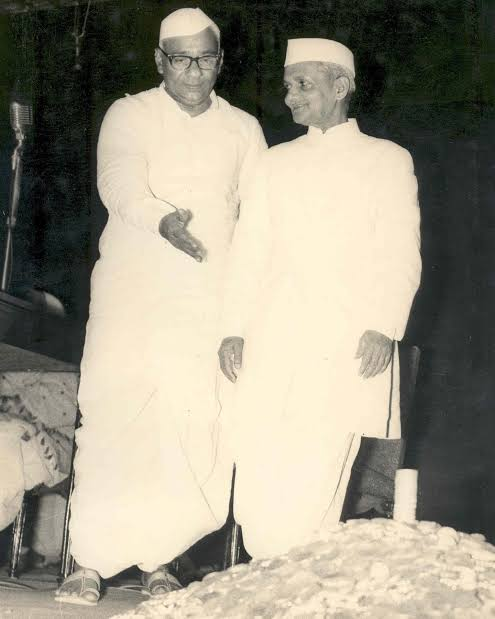
Prime Minister Lal Bahadur Shastri with CM Reddy in 1965

Reddy served as the cabinet minister in various governments. He served as the Chief Minister of Andhra Pradesh (1964-1971). Also held key positions such as Telecommunications Minister, Home Minister of India (1974–1977). It was during his tenure as home minister, Indira Gandhi declared Emergency in 1975 without his knowledge. His deputy Om Mehta was closer to Gandhi family than Reddy. He rebelled against Indira and expelled her from the Congress. She walked away with majority of leaders and cadres. Reddy headed the residual group called Reddy Congress which later merged with Congress (Indira). And also served as the Governor of Maharashtra (20 February 1988 to 18 January 1990). He was also only one of two elected All India Congress Committee Presidents, all others having been nominated.

=== Chief Minister (1964-1971) ===
Reddy is credited with creating the Industrial infrastructure in and around Hyderabad. During his long regime of seven years (longest for any Congress chief minister in the state of Andhra Pradesh), many major industries like BHEL, HMT, IDPL, Hindustan Cables and several defence establishments like MIDHANI, Bharath Dynamics were established. During his tenure as the Chief Minister, Jalagam Vengal Rao, the Home Minister was instrumental in suppressing the Naxal movement in the north coastal Andhra Pradesh. As many as 55 Public Sector Undertakings were established in and around Hyderabad during his tenure as the Chief Minister. He mounted pressure on the then Union Government in 1966 by passing a resolution in the Assembly, demanding the setting up of a Vizag Steel Plant in Visakhapatnam.

For the first time, he appointed a Commission to study the status of the Backward Classes in 1968. “Based on the recommendations of the Commission, reservation was provided to 92 castes through G.O. Ms. No. 1793, on September 23, 1970.

Reddy spared no effort to keep AP united, even in the face of the 1969 Telangana Agitation. It is said that over 9 months of the movement, about 370 youngsters and students were killed in police firings and that more than 70,000 people were arrested of which 7,000 were women and that people were lathi-charged 3,266 times, and about 20,000 people were injured in the lathi charge, and 1,840 people had received bullet injuries and fractures, tear gas was supposedly used 1,870 times. It is alleged that all of this was suppressed by the then Kasu Brahmananda Reddy government by using brute force.

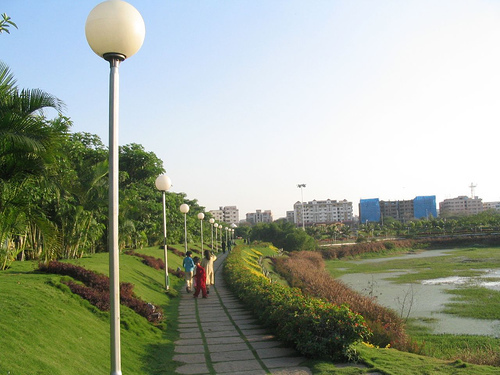
KBR National Park at Jubilee Hills

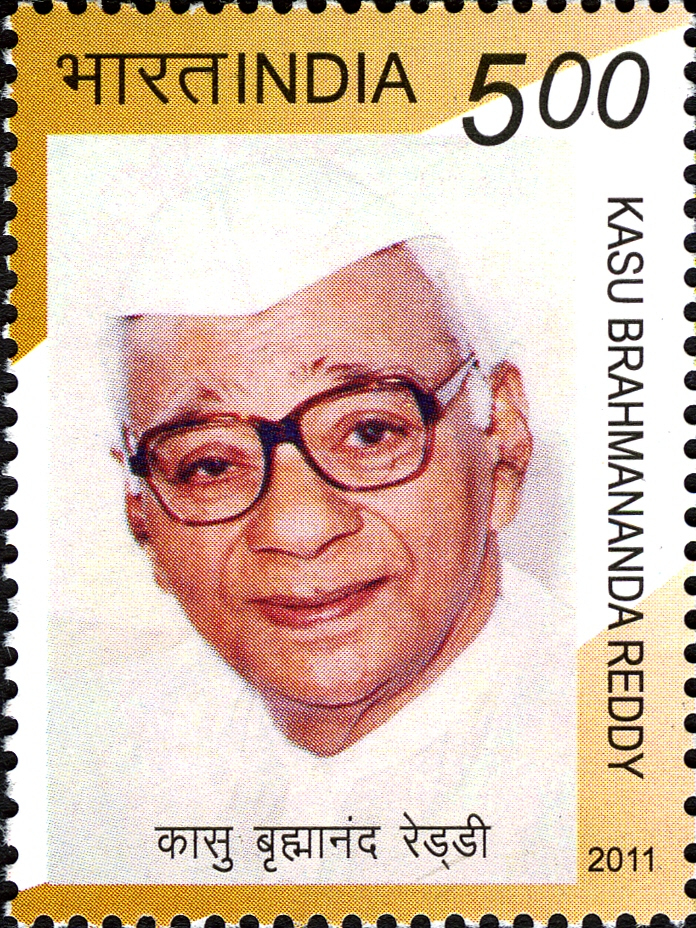
Stamp released by '"Government of India"
