= Yarapathineni Srinivasa Rao =

Indian politician

Member of Andhra Pradesh Legislative Assembly
- Incumbent
- Assumed office 2024
- Preceded by: Kasu Mahesh Reddy
- Constituency: Gurazala
- In office 2009–2019
- Preceded by: Janga Krishna Murthy
- Succeeded by: Kasu Mahesh Reddy
- Constituency: Gurazala
- In office 1994–1999
- Preceded by: Kaviti Venkata Narsi Reddy
- Succeeded by: Janga Krishna Murthy
- Constituency: Gurazala

Personal details
- Party: Telugu Desam Party
- Occupation: Politician

Yarapathineni Srinivasa Rao is an Indian politician belonging to Telugu Desam Party. He is the current Member of the Legislative Assembly for the state of Andhra Pradesh representing Gurazala Assembly constituency.

== Elections Results ==
=== 2024 ===
2024 Andhra Pradesh Legislative Assembly election: Gurazala
| Party | Candidate | Votes | % | ±% |
|---|---|---|---|---|
| TDP | Yarapathineni Srinivasa Rao | 128,201 | 55.01 | |
| YSRCP | Kasu Mahesh Reddy | 98,715 | 42.36 | |
| INC | Tiyyagura Yalamanda Reddy | 2,156 | 0.93 | |
| NOTA | None of the above | 1,888 | 0.81 | |
| Majority | | 29,486 | 12.65 | |
| Turnout | | 2,33,046 | | |
| TDP gain from YSRCP | | Swing | | |

=== 2019 ===
2019 Andhra Pradesh Legislative Assembly election: Gurazala
| Party | Candidate | Votes | % | ±% |
|---|---|---|---|---|
| YSRCP | Kasu Mahesh Reddy | 117,204 | 52.07 | |
| TDP | Yarapathineni Srinivasa Rao | 88,591 | 39.36 | |
| JSP | Chintalapudi Srinivasa Rao | 12,503 | 5.55 | New |
| Majority | | 28,613 | 12.83 | |
| Turnout | | 2,25,114 | 83.81 | +3.20 |
| Registered electors | | 268,598 | | |
| YSRCP gain from TDP | | Swing | | |

=== 2014 ===
2014 Andhra Pradesh Legislative Assembly election: Gurazala
| Party | Candidate | Votes | % | ±% |
|---|---|---|---|---|
| TDP | Yarapathineni Srinivasa Rao | 94,827 | 48.85% | |
| YSRCP | Janga Krishna Murthy | 87,640 | 45.15% | |
| Majority | | 7,187 | 3.72 | |
| Turnout | | 1,94,112 | 81.35% | |
| Registered electors | | 238,623 | | |
| TDP hold | | Swing | | |

=== 2009 ===
2009 Andhra Pradesh Legislative Assembly election: Gurazala
| Party | Candidate | Votes | % | ±% |
|---|---|---|---|---|
| TDP | Yerapatineni Srinivasa Rao | 72,250 | 43.58 | −1.22 |
| INC | Ala Venkateswarlu | 62,229 | 37.53 | −13.02 |
| PRP | Gurram Gopi Sridhar | 24,563 | 14.82 | |
| Majority | | 10,021 | 6.05 | |
| Turnout | | 165,849 | 78.21 | +10.04 |
| Registered electors | | 212,059 | | |
| TDP gain from INC | | Swing | | |

=== 2004 ===
2004 Andhra Pradesh Legislative Assembly election: Gurazala
| Party | Candidate | Votes | % | ±% |
|---|---|---|---|---|
| INC | Janga Krishna Murthy | 73,358 | 50.55 | +2.12 |
| TDP | Yarapatineni Srinivasarao | 65,015 | 44.80 | −3.53 |
| Majority | | 8,343 | 5.75 | |
| Turnout | | 145,147 | 68.17 | +3.51 |
| Registered electors | | 212,908 | | |
| INC hold | | Swing | | |

=== 1999 ===
1999 Andhra Pradesh Legislative Assembly election: Gurazala
| Party | Candidate | Votes | % | ±% |
|---|---|---|---|---|
| INC | Janga Krishna Murthy | 64,035 | 48.43% | |
| TDP | Yerapatineni Srinivasa Rao | 63,904 | 48.33% | |
| Margin of victory | | 131 | 0.10% | |
| Turnout | | 135,969 | 66.49% | |
| Registered electors | | 204,508 | | |
| INC gain from TDP | | Swing | | |

=== 1994 ===
1994 Andhra Pradesh Legislative Assembly election: Gurazala
| Party | Candidate | Votes | % | ±% |
|---|---|---|---|---|
| TDP | Yerapatineni Srinivasa Rao | 62,943 | 51.85% | |
| INC | Rameshchandra Dath Kanakam | 38,976 | 32.11% | |
| Margin of victory | | 23,967 | 19.74% | |
| Turnout | | 124,082 | 67.61% | |
| Registered electors | | 183,515 | | |
| TDP gain from INC | | Swing | | |
