= Vavilala Gopalakrishnayya =

Indian politician (1906–2003)

Vavilala Gopalakrishnayya or Andhra Gandhi
- Born: 1906; Sattenapalle, Guntur district, Madras Presidency, British India
- Died: 2003 (aged 96–97); Hyderabad
- Citizenship: India
- Awards: Kalaprapurna Award, Padma Bhushan Award

Vavilala Gopalakrishnayya (1906 – 29 April 2003) was a legislator in the 1950s and 1960s and religiously followed the Gandhian philosophy.

== Biography ==
Born in 1906 at Sattenapalle in Guntur District of Andhra, he started his career as a journalist but became involved in the freedom struggle. After Independence, he was elected to the assembly of the Madras Presidency in 1952, the Andhra State assembly in 1955, and the Andhra Pradesh Legislative Assembly in 1962 and 1967 from Sattenapalli. On all four occasions, he was elected as an independent with the support of the undivided Communist Party of India. He was also associated with the cooperative movement and the library movement in Andhra Pradesh.

In his long political life, Vavilala participated in almost all major agitations in the state, including the Vishalandhra movement for the formation of Andhra Pradesh in the mid-1950s, the Nandigonda project agitation in Guntur, and farmers' agitations. He also participated in the anti-arrack agitation and the movement for total prohibition in the state in the 1990s. Vavilala was chairman of a state-level implementation committee for total prohibition before the ban on Indian-made foreign liquor was relaxed in 1997.

He was also chairman of the Andhra Pradesh Official Language Commission. Andhra University honoured him with the award of Kalaprapurna. He was also conferred the title of Padma Bhushan by the central government.

== Individual Satyagraha and Quit India Movement ==
During the 1940's Vavilala Gopalakrishnayya participated in Individual Satyagraha in Guntur Town Hall in Andhra Pradesh.

== Awards ==
- Kalaprapurna (honorary doctorate), Andhra University
- 1992: Padma Bhushan
