= Yalamanchili Veeranjaneyulu =

Indian politician

Yalamanchili Veeranjaneyulu served as the Member of the Legislative Assembly for Sattenapalli constituency in Andhra Pradesh, India, between 1999 and 2004. They represented the Telugu Desam Party.
