= Dodda Balakoti Reddy =

Indian politician

Dodda Balakoti Reddy served as the Member of the Legislative Assembly for Sattenapalli constituency in Andhra Pradesh, India, between 1989 and 1994. He represented the Indian National Congress.
