= Kasu Krishna Reddy =

Indian politician (born 1947)

Kasu Venkata Krishna Reddy

Minister of Cooperation Government of Andhra Pradesh
- In office 25 November 2010 – 21 February 2014
- Governor: E. S. L. Narasimhan
- Chief Minister: Nallari Kiran Kumar Reddy
- Preceded by: Gade Venkata Reddy
- Succeeded by: President's Rule

Minister of Food & Civil Supplies, Public Distribution and Consumer Affairs Government of Andhra Pradesh
- In office 26 April 2007 – 20 May 2009
- Governor: N. D. Tiwari
- Chief Minister: Y. S. Rajasekhar Reddy

Member of Parliament, Lok Sabha
- In office 1989-1996
- Preceded by: Katuri Narayana swamy
- Succeeded by: Kota Saidaiah
- Constituency: Narasaraopet

Member of Legislative Assembly Andhra Pradesh
- In office 2004–2014
- Preceded by: Kodela Siva Prasad Rao
- Succeeded by: Gopireddy Srinivasa Reddy
- Constituency: Narasaraopet
- In office 1978–1983
- Preceded by: Dondeti Krishna Reddy
- Succeeded by: Kodela Siva Prasad Rao
- Constituency: Narasaraopet

Personal details
- Born: 28 September 1947 (age 79) Narasaraopet, Palnadu district, Andhrapradesh
- Party: Indian National Congress Party
- Children: Kasu Mahesh Reddy
- Education: Graduate B.Sc, Andhra university (Loyola college, Vijayawada)

Kasu Venkata Krishna Reddy (born 28 September 1947) is an Indian politician. He was a minister in Nallari Kiran Kumar Reddy's government.

== Personal life ==
He is the son of Kasu Vengal Reddy and nephew of Kasu Brahmananda Reddy, a former Chief Minister of Andhra Pradesh.

== Career ==
Krishna Reddy has been a Member of the Legislative Assembly from Narasaraopet in the Guntur district, Andhra Pradesh. Kasu Krishna Reddy was elected MP twice from Narasaraopet Lok Sabha constituency (1989, 1991) and MLA thrice from Narasaraopet (Assembly constituency)(1978, 2004, 2009). He was a minister in the cabinets of T Anjaiah, YS Rajasekhar Reddy and N Kirankumar Reddy.

== See also ==
- List of people from Andhra Pradesh
- List of United Progressive Alliance candidates in the Indian general election, 2014
