= Nadikudi–Srikalahasti section =

Indian railway section

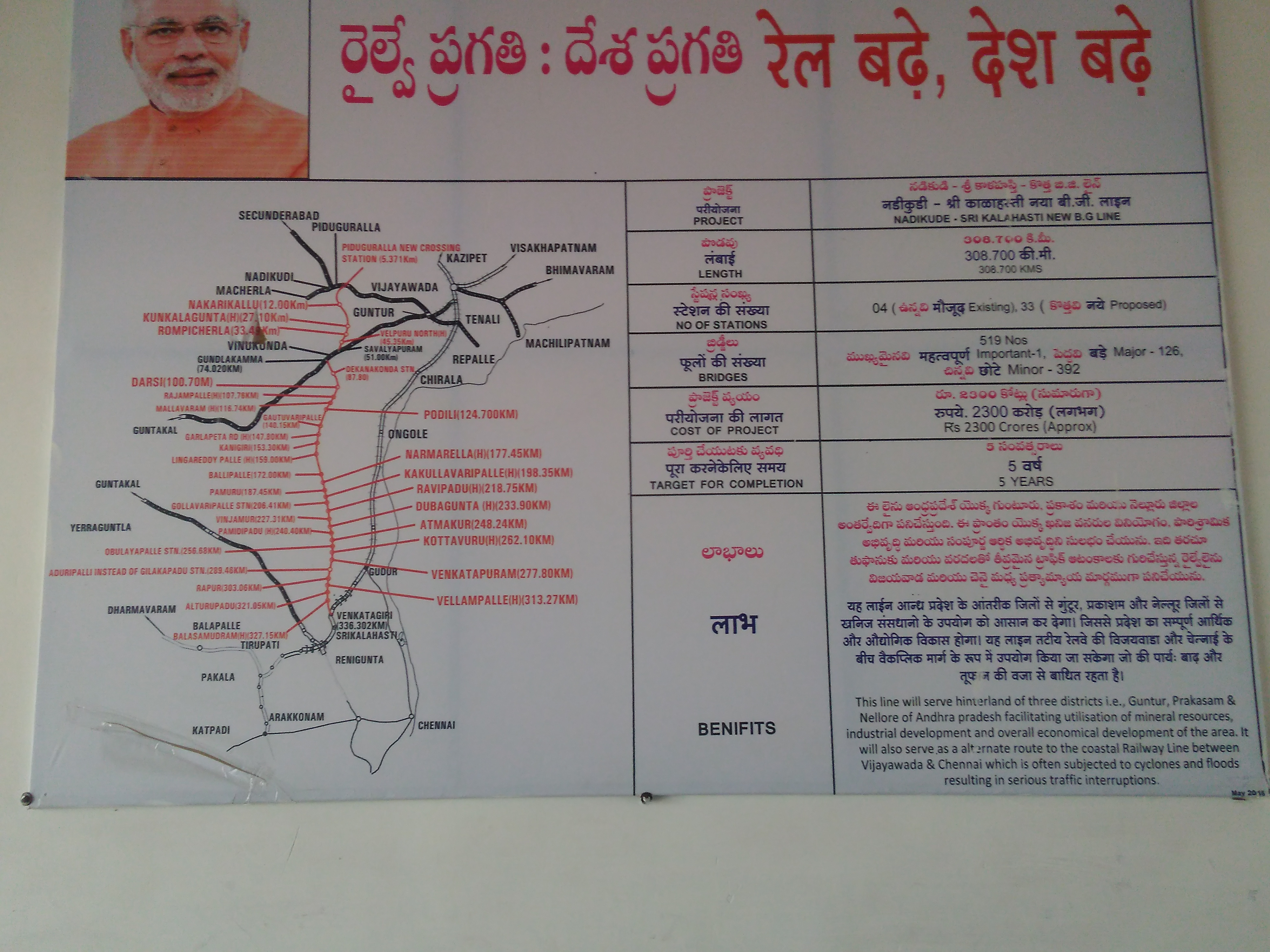
- Nadikudi-srikalahasti route details

Overview
- Status: Under construction
- Owner: Indian Railways
- Locale: Andhra Pradesh
- Termini: Nadikudi; Srikalahasti

Service
- Operator: South Coast Railway zone

Technical
- Line length: 308 km (191 mi)
- Track gauge: 1,676 mm (5 ft 6 in)
- Electrification: Ongoing
- Operating speed: 130 km/h

The Nadikudi–Srikalahasti section is an ongoing railway section project of the Indian Railways. The section falls under the administration of Guntur of South Coast Railway zone. This serves as an alternative route to Vijayawada-Chennai and Tirupati-Secundrabad.

== The project ==
The project was sanctioned in the year 2010–11. It connects Secunderabad–Guntur branch line at Piduguralla of Palnadu district and Gudur–Katpadi branch line at Venkatagiri of Tirupati district in the Indian state of Andhra Pradesh. The total length of the section is 308 km (191 mi) estimated cost of the project is ₹2,452 crore (US$250 million). The railway stations of which lies between the nodal stations are Nekarikallu, Rompicherla, Vinukonda, Gundlakamma, Darsi, Podili, Kanigiri, Pamuru, Vinjamuru, Atmakuru, Rapur and Venkatagiri.

== Phase-1 ==
Nadikudi (Guntur–Hyderabad route) to Savalyapuram (Guntur–Guntakal route) track, trial run completed. Electrification proposals for the completed route are sent to Higher authorities. By the end of 2018, this new route will be added to Guntur–Guntakal route. DRM Guntur says that the project deadline is 2022. At Rapur railway station (junction) both Nadikudi–Srikalahasti and Krishnapatnam–Obulavaripalle railway line cross each other.

== Proposed list of stations ==
It starts from Nadikudi railway Junction in Secunderabad–Guntur lane and passes through Piduguralla and from there new line starts with Nekarikallu, Rompicherla and connects with the Guntur–Guntakal section at Savalyapuram and passes through Vinukonda and again enters new line from Gundlakamma which passes through Darsi, Podili, Kanigiri, Pamuru, Vinjamuru, Dubagunta, Atmakuru, Obulayapalle, Rapuru and finally connects Venkatagiri at Gudur–Renigunta section.
