= Cumbum =

Cumbum may refer to:

== Andhra Pradesh, India ==
- Cumbum, Andhra Pradesh, a town in Praksam district
  - Cumbum mandal, an administrative division
  - Cumbum railway station

== Tamil Nadu, India ==
- Cumbum Valley, Theni district
  - Cumbum, Tamil Nadu, a town
    - Cumbum (state assembly constituency)
