= Brahmagiri, Telangana =

Coordinates: 16°6′11″N 78°53′55″E

Bramhagiri is a village of Nagarkurnool district in the Indian state of Telangana. It is near to Srisailam Dam and the temple of Srisailam.

Bramhagiri also known as Domalapenta from 1963 to 19 July 2025 is a village on the left side of Srisailam Project, situated in Nallamala Hills of Nagarkurnool district, Telangana, India. It is on the left bank of River Krishna, about 186 km south of Telangana's capital Hyderabad.

Bramhagiri has an average elevation of 415 meters (1,362 feet).
