= Guntur division =

Guntur division may mean:

- Guntur revenue division
- Guntur railway division
