= Krishnagiri, Telangana =

Coordinates: 16°05′30″N 78°53′38″E

Krishnagiri (Eegalapenta) is a village of Nagarkurnool district in the Indian state of Telangana. It is near to Srisailam Dam and the temple of Srisailam.

Krishnagiri, also known as Eegalapenta from 1963 to 19 July 2025, is a village on the left side of Srisailam Project, situated in Nallamala Hills of Nagarkurnool district, Telangana, India. It is on the left bank of River Krishna, about 188 km south of Telangana's capital Hyderabad.
