= Kanigiri =

Kanigiri Kanakagiri Vijaya Marthanda Durga
- Town
- Nicknames: Kanakagiri, Kanakapatnam
- Location in Andhra Pradesh, India
- Coordinates: 15.4000°N 79.5167°E
- Country: India
- State: Andhra Pradesh
- District: Markapuram
- Mandal: Kanigiri mandal

Government
  - Type: Municipal Council
  - Body: Kanigiri Municipality
- Elevation: 101 m (331 ft)

Population
  - Total: 44,755

Languages
  - Official: Telugu
- Time zone: UTC+5:30 (IST)
- PIN: 523230
- Telephone code: +91–8402
- Vehicle registration: AP-39
- Website: https://kanigiri.cdma.ap.gov.in/

Kanigiri is a town in Markapuram district of the Indian state of Andhra Pradesh. It is a municipality and the headquarters of Kanigiri mandal in Kanigiri revenue division. It is known for its Kanigiri hill.

== Etymology ==
The name is a vernacular transformation of Kanakagiri (Kanaka meaning gold and Giri meaning Hill). In olden times it was said that the town adjoining the hill was called Kanakapatnam.

== History ==
Kanigiri was under the rule of Vijanagar, Gajapathis, Yadaya, Reddi dynasties and Bahamani Sultans.. The first cases of endemic skeletal fluorosis (and its neurological signs) in the world were recorded in the Podili, Darsi and Kanigiri areas of Andhra Pradesh in 1937.

== Geography ==
The town has a maximum elevation of 380 meters which is on Kanigiri Hill located on the Northern edge of the municipality. Excluding the hill, the Kanigiri Municipality's average elevation is 95 meters. The minimum elevation is 70 meters and the maximum elevation is 120 meters. The hill base starts at 120 meters and goes up to 380 meters. The hill is under the ownership of the forest department. There is a temple at the top and at the base of the hill and a water body where the water treatment Plant and water pumping station are located.

== Climate ==
Kanigiri has a tropical climate, specifically a tropical wet and dry climate (Aw) under the Köppen climate classification, Kanigiri is located near the coast of the Bay of Bengal. The town is surrounded by the range of Eastern Ghats. It has an average elevation of 101 metres (334 feet), and enjoys a hot climate for most of the year.

== Demographics ==
As of 2011 Census, the total population of the Kanigiri was 37,420, of which male population constitutes 18,886 and female population of 18,534. It has a literacy rate of 77.55 per cent. The population under six years of age are 4,065.

== Administration ==
Kanigiri is also declared as a municipality during 2013-2014. There are total 32 administrative wards. The total area is around 54.22 km^{2}. It is the headquarters for Kanigiri revenue division in markapuram district. It is one of the selected ULBs under AMRUT Scheme. Water from the reservoir Nagarjuna Sagar Dam via pump lines reaches the town through a plant near Doruvu.

== Regional connectivity ==
NH 565 passes through the Municipality which connects Kanigiri to Hyderabad on the Northern side and Tirupati on the southern side. Other than that, the Ollapalem-Vemulapadu road (Kandukur-Kanigiri Road) which is a State Highway, connects Kanigiri to Kandukur towards the East and further connects it to NH 16. On the Western side, the State Highway connects Kanigiri to Kurnool. Bangalore - Vijaywada Expressway is under construction passes through the town.

Railway Line from Nadikudi to Srikalahasti (Nadikudi-Srikalahasti section) under construction passes through Kanigiri Town.

== Transport ==
Kanigiri is connected by road to all other cities in Andhra Pradesh by Andhra Pradesh State Road Transport Corporation. Kanigiri has its own APSRTC Depot, providing bus connectivity to all major cities like Vijaywada, Guntur, Rajamundry, Visakhapatnam, Hyderabad, Chennai, Bangalore etc..and many more major towns

The nearest railway Station is at Donakonda railway station at 50 kms, Markapur road railway station at 56kms, singarayakonda railway station at 63kms from Kanigiri Municipality. There is a proposed railway line from Nadikudi to Srikalahasti which would pass through Kanigiri. The Kanigiri railway station works was completed train movements yet to be started.

Vijayawada, which has the nearest airport to Kanigiri is at a distance of 200 km.

== Education ==
Kanigiri has well-developed education system supported by both government and private institutions. The town has well-established primary and high schools, along with government junior college and degree colleges, and a private Engineering college providing students with access to education at various levels.

The Government of Andhra Pradesh has approved for establishment of an Indian Institute of Information Technology (IIIT) at ballipalli, Kanigiri mandal. Construction yet to begin.

== Health ==
Kanigiri government hospital has community health centre status. One urban health centre at devanganagar, primary health centre at machavaram with in municipality limits.
