= Donakonda =

- Village
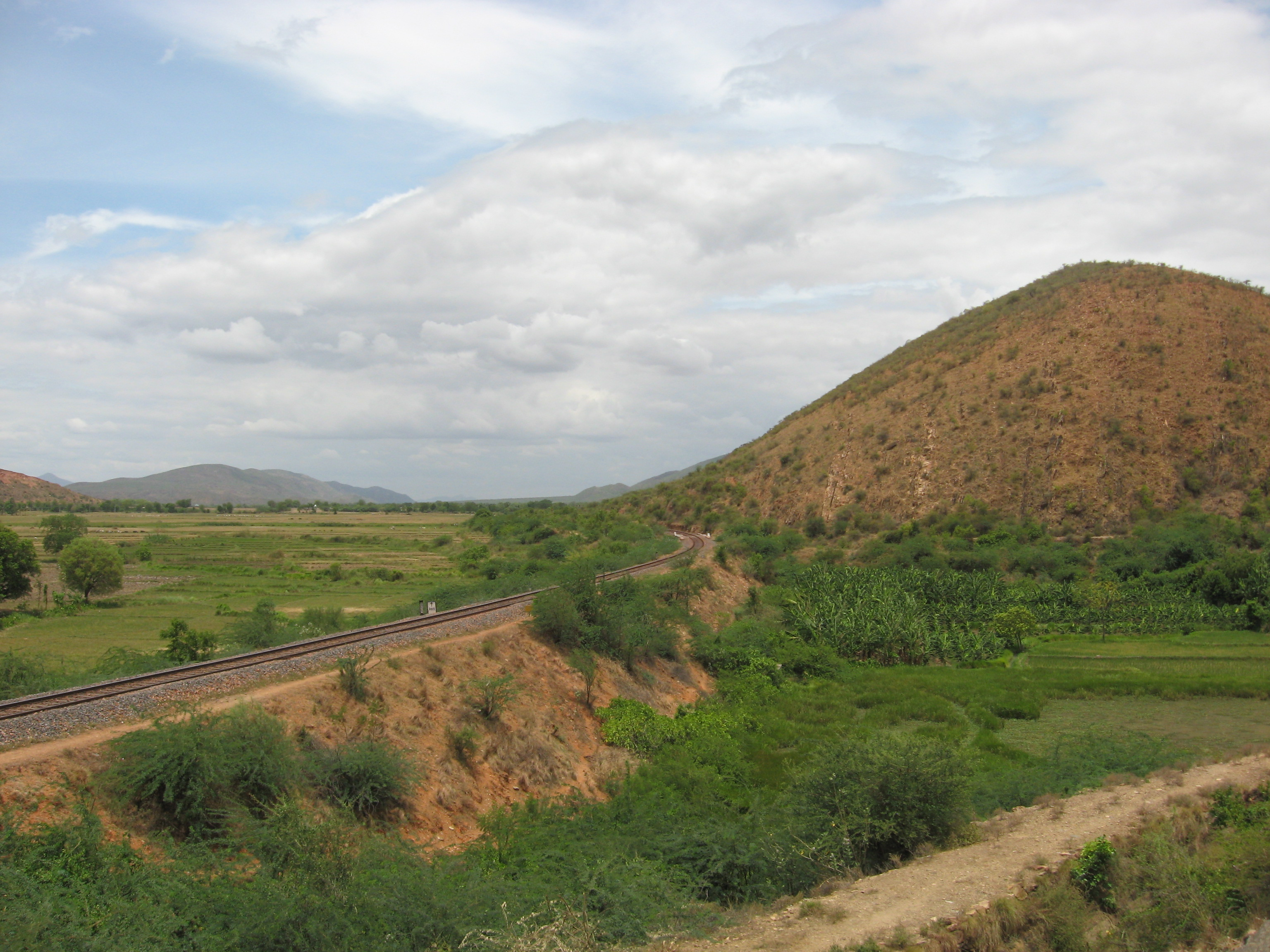
- Vinukonda- Nandyal train section passes through Madhira
- Interactive map of Donakonda
- Location in Andhra Pradesh, India Donakonda (India)
- Coordinates: 15.8333°N 79.4833°E
- Country: India
- State: Andhra Pradesh
- District: Prakasam
- Mandal: Donakonda

Population (2011)
  - Total: 2,028

Languages
  - Official: Telugu
- Time zone: UTC+5:30 (IST)
- PIN: 523305
- Vehicle registration: AP

Donakonda is a village in the Prakasam District of the Indian state of Andhra Pradesh.

== Geography ==
It is located in Donakonda mandal in Addanki revenue division The terrain is mostly flat but is surrounded by hills some distance away.

Donakonda is a village in Donakonda Mandal in Prakasam district. It belongs to Andhra region . It is located approximately 81 kilometres (50 mi) west from the district headquarters Ongole. It is a mandal headquarters. Donakonda is bounded by Kurichedu and Darsi mandals to the east, Tripuranthakam Mandal to the north and Konakanamittla & Markapuram Mandal to the south.

Donakonda's pin code is 523305 and its postal head office is Donakonda R.S.

Donakonda Mandal is part of Darsi constituency.

Demographics of Donakonda

Telugu is the Local Language here.

== Transport ==
Donakonda Railway Station is situated on the Guntur-Guntakal railway line and falls under the Guntur division of South Central Railway. Donakonda Airport (ICAO: VODK) is located at Donakonda in Andhra Pradesh, India. The airfield was constructed during World War II by the British regime to refuel its aircraft. It is owned by the Airports Authority of India and is now closed.

The Government of Andhra Pradesh handed over the Donakonda airport to Bhogapuram Airport Authority and an ongoing extension of the airport is being worked on.

Donakonda Mega Industrial Hub (APIIC) - Address: RCQX+HX5, Donakonda to Manginapudi Rd, Donakonda, Andhra Pradesh 523305.

== Villages ==
- Thummedalapadu
- Aravallipadu
- Peddanpalem
- Sangapuram
- Gangadevipalli
- Mallampeta
- P.Lakshmipuram
- Manginapudi
- Rudrasamudram
- Pullayapalle
- KotcherlaKota
- Chandavaram
- Polepalli
- Yarrabalem
- Pedda Gudipadu
- Chinnagudipadu
- Bhumanapalli
- Narasimhanayuni Palem
- Illacheruvu
- P.Venkatapuram
- Naveenapuram
