= Diguvametta =

- Village
- Interactive map of Diguvametta
- Location in Andhra Pradesh, India Diguvametta (India)
- Coordinates: 15.3833°N 78.8330°E
- Country: India
- State: Andhra Pradesh
- District: Markapuram
- Talukas: Giddalur
- Elevation: 297 m (974 ft)

Population
  - Total: 5,166

Languages
  - Official: Telugu
- Time zone: UTC+5:30 (IST)

Diguvametta is a village in Markapuram district, Andhra Pradesh, India. It is located in the Nallamala Hills and is surrounded by forests on almost all sides. It had a population of 5166 at the time of the 2001 Census.

== Geography ==
Diguvametta is located at 15.3833°N 78.8330°E. Its altitude coupled with its location give it a somewhat cooler climate than the rest of the district. It has ample water reserves in the form of reservoirs and ponds and was used as a watering stop for trains earlier.

== Demographics ==
The population is 5166. A significant chunk of the population belongs to the Chenchu tribe that inhabit the Nallamala Ranges.
