= Donakonda railway station =

Railway station in Andhra Pradesh, India

Donakonda
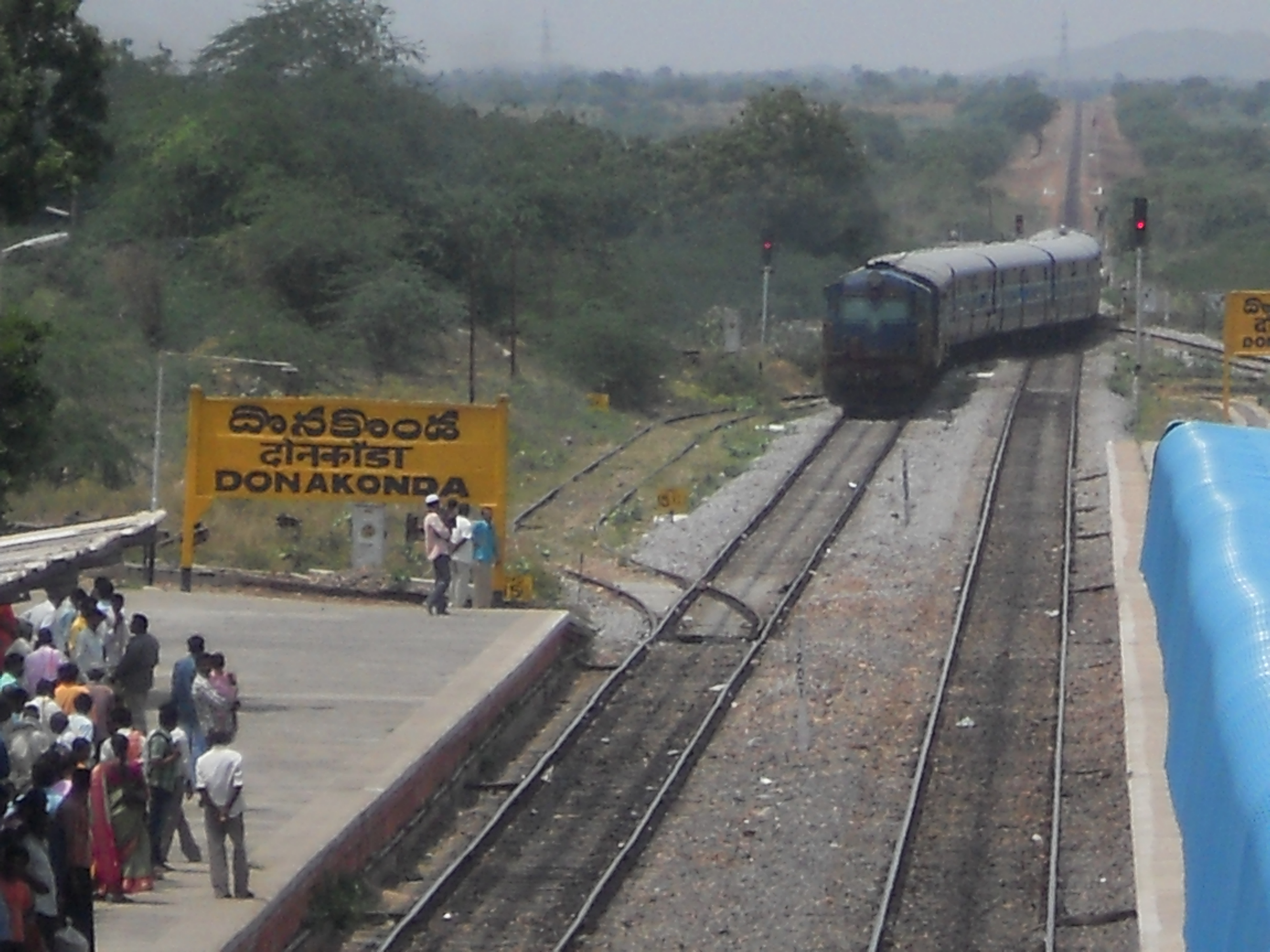
- Donakonda railway station overview

General information
- Location: Donakonda; Prakasam district Andhra Pradesh; India
- Coordinates: 15.8333°N 79.4833°E
- Elevation: 150 metres (490 ft)
- System: Indian railway station
- Owner: Indian Railways
- Line: Vijayawada – Guntakal
- Platforms: 3
- Tracks: 3

Construction
- Structure type: At ground
- Parking: yes

Other information
- Status: Functional
- Station code: DKD
- Zone(s): South Central Railway zone
- Division(s): Guntur

Services
Preceding station	Indian Railways	Following station
Potlapadu towards ?	South Central Railway zone Vijayawada–Guntakal	Gajjelakonda towards ?
Location
- Location within Andhra Pradesh

Donakonda railway station (station code: DKD), is located in Prakasam district of Andhra Pradesh, India, and serves Donakonda.

== Structure and amenities ==
The station has rooftop solar panels installed by the Indian Railways, along with various railway stations and service buildings in the country, as a part of sourcing 500 MW solar energy.
