= Guntur railway division =

Railway division of India

Coordinates: 16°18′04″N 80°26′36″E

Guntur Railway Division
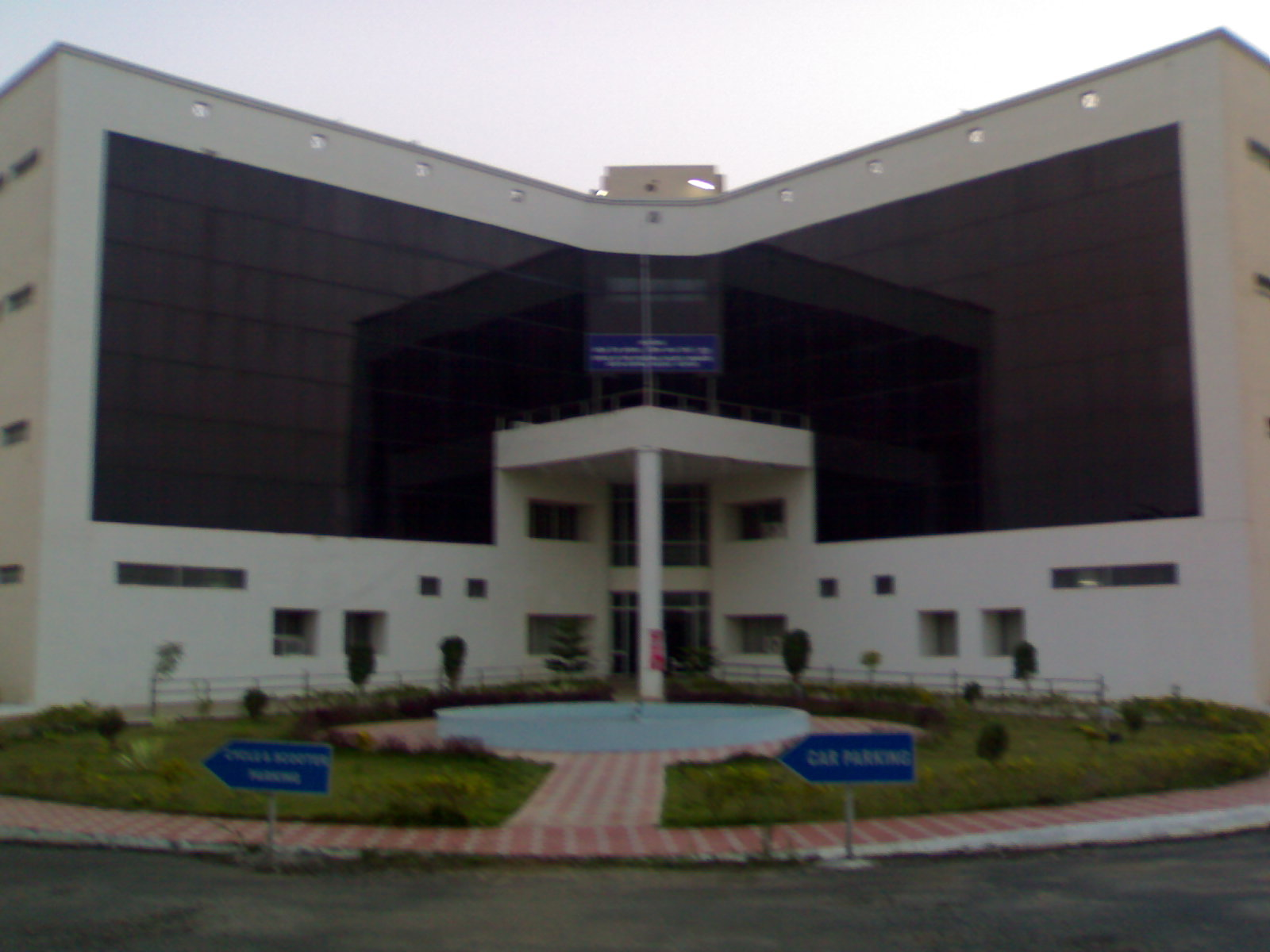
- Rail Vikas Bhavan (Divisional Railway Manager Office) at Pattabhipuram of Guntur

Overview
- Headquarters: Guntur
- Reporting mark: GNT
- Locale: Andhra Pradesh, India
- Dates of operation: 1 April 2003–
- Predecessor: SCR

Technical
- Track gauge: Broad
- Previous gauge: Metre
- Electrification: 1989
- Length: 629.516 km (391.163 mi)

Other
- Website: Official Website

Guntur railway division is one of the four divisions of the South Coast Railway zone (SCoR) of Indian Railways. The division was sanctioned in 1995–96 and was fully operational on 1 April 2003, with its headquarters at Guntur. The Rail Vikas Bhavan in Pattabhipuram area of Guntur, serves as the office of Divisional Railway Manager. The present divisional manager is M. Ramakrishna.

== History ==
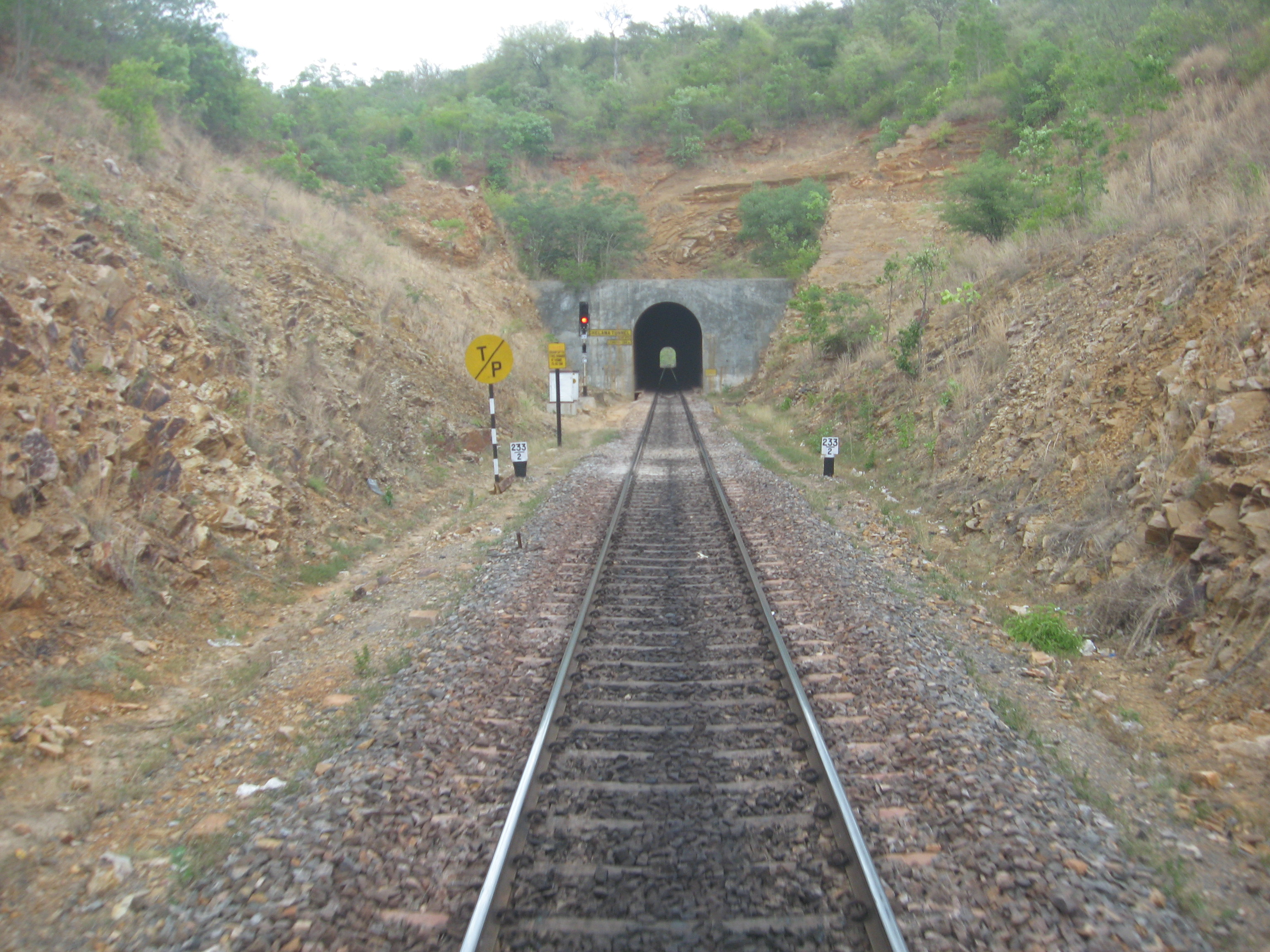
Chelama Tunnel, Guntur Division

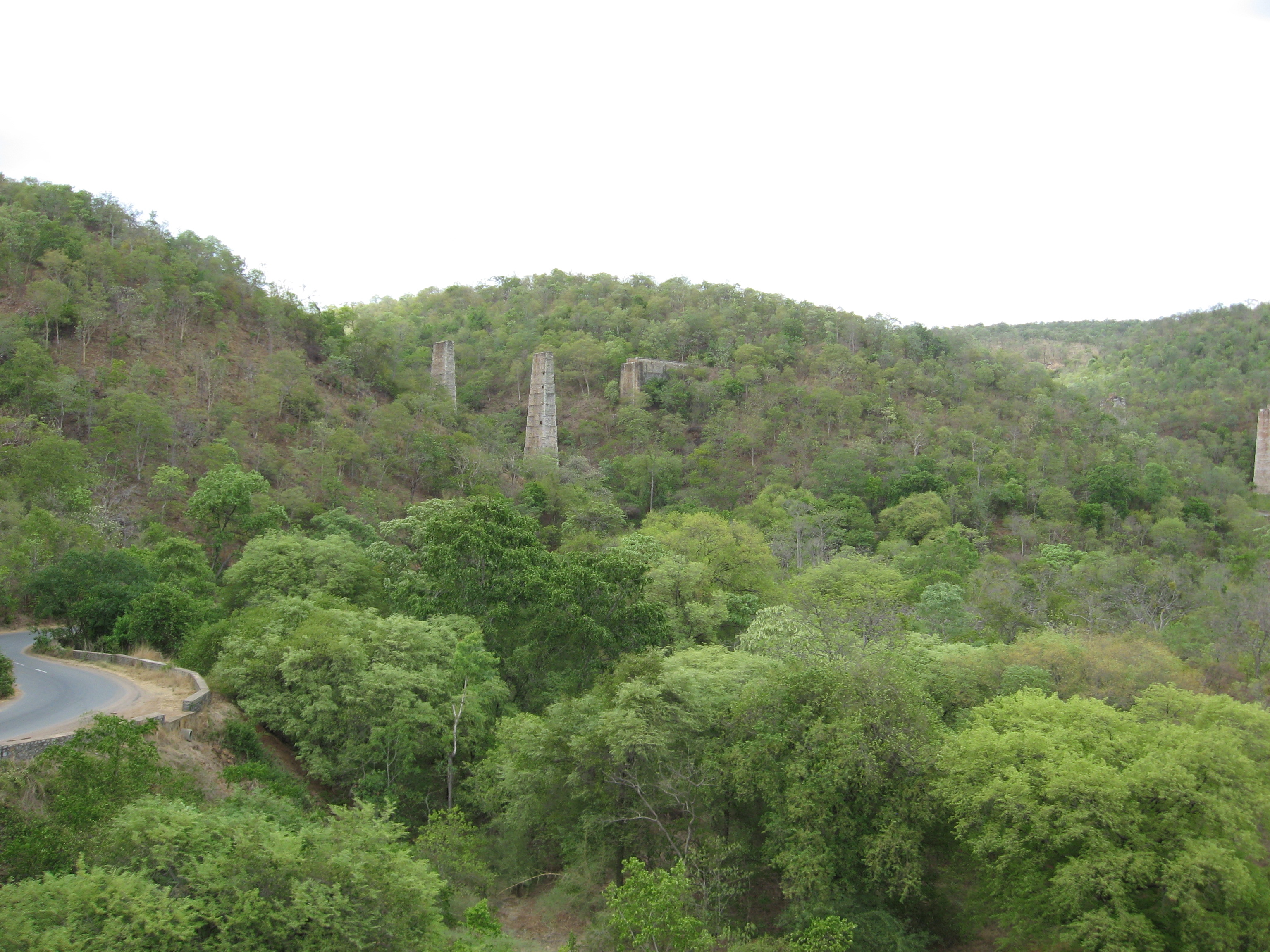
The remains of the old Dorabavi Viaduct, Bogada Guntur Division

The Krishna Canal-Nandyal (KCC-NDL) stretch was a part of the important east–west coast link that connected Margao in Goa to Masulipatnam in the erstwhile Madras Province of British India. It was originally built to Metre Gauge by the Southern Mahratta Railway (later the Madras and Southern Mahratta Railway-MSMR) during 1889–90. The track passed through the Nallamala Hills and as a result quite a few major engineering works were undertaken in the course of the railroad construction, the most impressive of them being the massive Dorabavi Viaduct and the Bogada Tunnel, both of them about 30 km from Nandyal. This section was converted to Broad Gauge during 1993–95. The gauge conversion was a difficult task owing to the difficult terrain. The old alignment between Gazulapalli and Diguvametta was abandoned and a new Bogada tunnel, about 1.6 km in length and a new Dorabavi Viaduct located at a much lower altitude were constructed at a huge expense. The railway passes through the historic Cumbum Tank, starting from Cumbum railway station and spread over an area of 7 km. It is one of the most picturesque valleys in Guntur-Nandyal section of South Central Railway.

The Guntur-Macherla section was opened in 1930, by the Madras and Southern Mahratta Railway to serve the backward inner Telangana region. It too was originally metre gauge and was converted to 5 ft 6 in (1,676 mm) broad gauge in 1992–93. This section was used for the transport of limestone, quartz &cement, primarily from Piduguralla, popularly known as the Lime City. The section from Guntur to the coastal town of Repalle was built to the broad gauge by the Madras and Southern Railway in 1916. This line connected to the East Coast main line at Tenali. The section from Tenali to Repalle was owned by Guntur District Board until 1964. The foundation stone for the 152 km long Bibinagar-Nadikudi rail project that opened an alternative route to Secunderabad from Vijayawada and connected the interior of Telangana to Hyderabad was laid by the then Prime Minister of India, Indira Gandhi on 7 April 1974. The project was finally finished in 1989 and the line commissioned a year later.

Two major bridges to span the Krishna River and Musi are located in this section. It is used by many south/east bound trains in a bid to decongest the heavily used Warangal-Vijayawada line. New rail lines are added in the region such as Nadikudi–Srikalahasti section, part of which comes under the division. This will be an alternate route to Chennai/Tirupati for Guntur City.

== Jurisdiction ==
The jurisdiction of the division covers the districts of Guntur, Kurnool, Prakasam in Andhra Pradesh and Yadadri Bhuvanagiri, Nalgonda in Telangana. It has a total route length of 629.516 km (391.163 mi) and running track of 660.992 km (410.721 mi). In Andhra Pradesh, it has a total route length of 484.78 km (301.23 mi) and in Telangana it is 144.94 km (90.06 mi).

=== Sections and branch lines ===
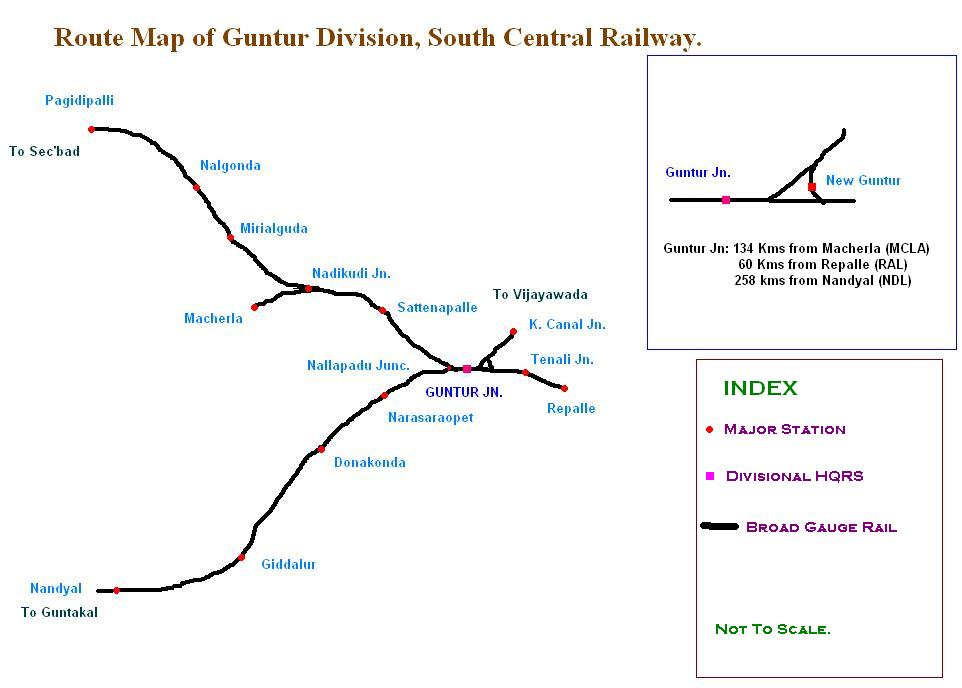
Jurisdictional route map of Guntur Railway Division

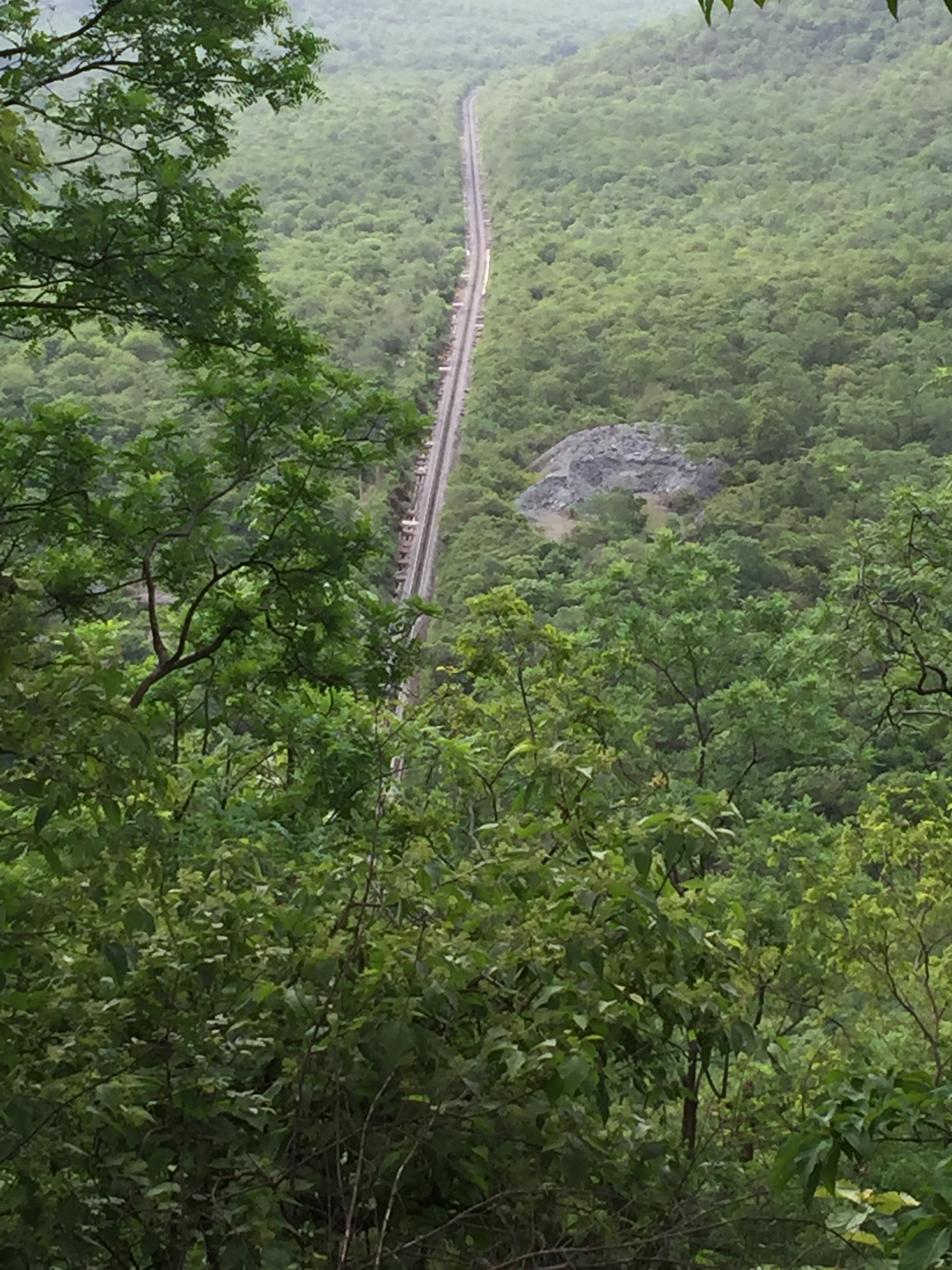
Railway track between Nandyal and Giddalur as viewed from Nallamala Ghat Road

The sections and branch lines route map breakup is as follows:

Section	Distance (in km)	Double/Single line	Traction
Guntur–Krishna Canal (excluding Krishna Canal)	27.12	Double	Electric
Guntur–Tenali (excluding Tenali)	24.27	Double	Electric
Nallapadu - Vishnupuram(excl)	109	Single	Electric
Nallapadu–Nandyal section	256.98	Double & Single	Electric
New Piduguralla–Savalyapuram section	46	Single	Electric
Gundlakamma–Kanigiri section	79.28	Single	Diesel
Tenali–Repalle (excluding Tenali)	32.10	Single	Electric
Nadikudi–Macherla	35.01	Single	Electric
Other lines
Guntur – Nallapadu	5.00	Double	Electric
Guntur Byepass Line	1.94	Single	Electric
Total	613.711 Route Km		

Source: SCR Railway Map 2018

Under construction:

- Nadikudi-Srikalahasti railway line

=== Categorization of stations ===
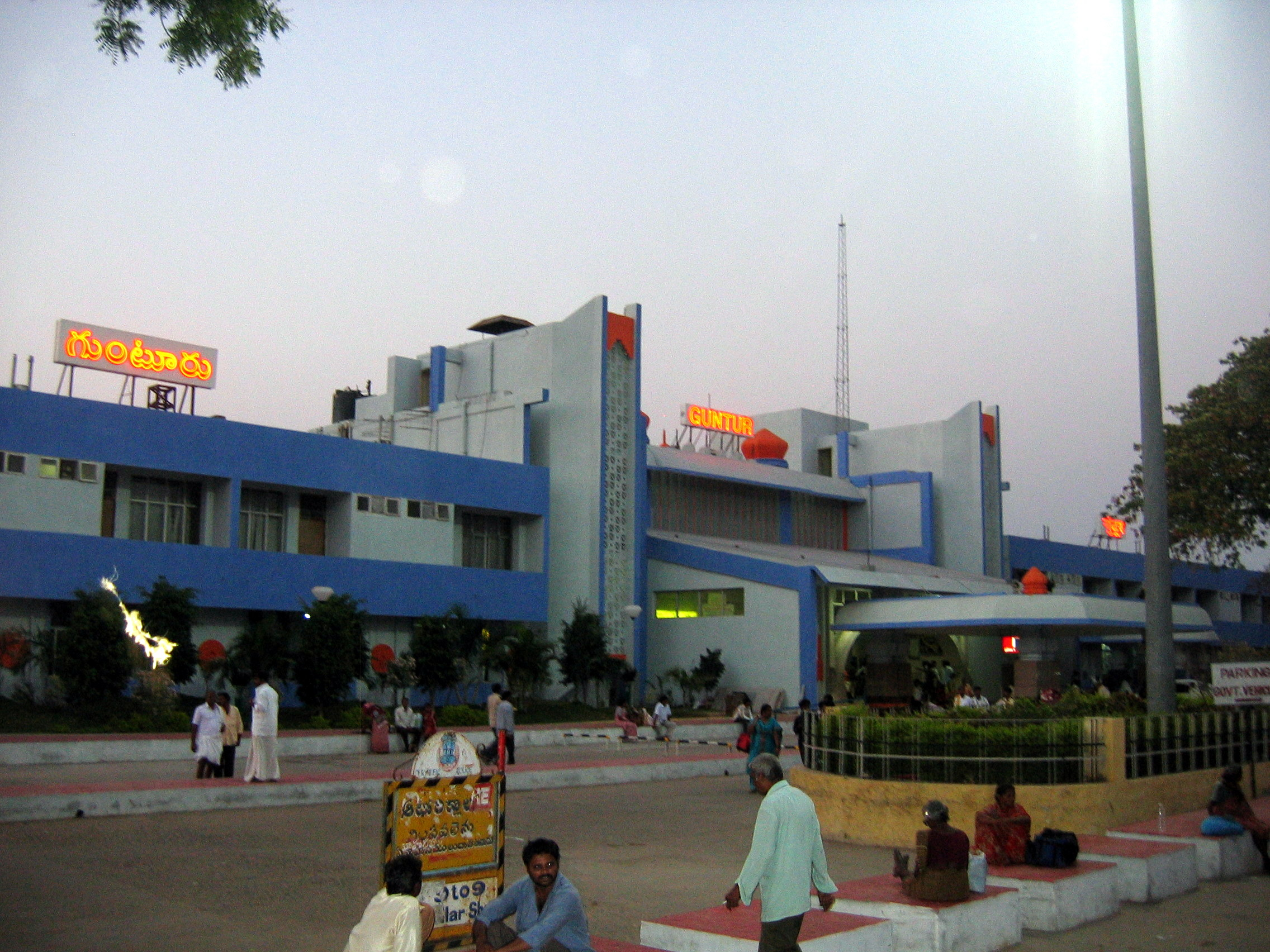
Guntur Junction railway station in 2007

The list includes the stations under the jurisdiction of Guntur railway division and classified based on their respective category.

Category	No. of stations	Names of stations
A1 Category		Guntur Junction
A Category	1	Guntur Junction
B Category	2	Nandyal Junction and Nalgonda
C Category	0	—
D Category	13	Cumbum, Donakonda, Giddalur, Macherla, Markapur Road, Mangalagiri, Mirylaguda, Nadikudi, Narasaraopet, Piduguralla, Repalle, Sattenapalle, Vinukonda
E Category	43	New Guntur
F Category	13	Angalakuduru, Gudimetta, Gudipudi, GURZ (station code), Krishnamsettypalle, Lingamguntla, Mamdapur, Mandapadu, Pedakakani Halt, Penumarru, Rentachintala, Vellalcheruvu Halt, Zampini
Non-operational	4	Bommaipalle, JNPD (station code), Kondrapole Halt, Nandipalli
Total	75	—

== Performance and earnings ==
The division operates around 200 express, passenger and freight trains every day. The primary commodity transported by the division is cement, clinker, food grains, besides coal and fertilizer. Other commodities include cotton, chillies, limestone, paddy, tobacco and timber waste. In 2003, the freight earnings were ₹93 crore (US$9.9 million). After a decade, it stands at ₹452 crore (US$48 million) in 2013–14. In 2008–09, the gross revenue was ₹237 crore (US$25 million), a decline in figures compared to previous fiscal of ₹272 crore (US$29 million), due to recession. In the fiscal year 2018–19, it registered a growth of 69% freight earnings alone.

Revenue (in million rupees)	2019-20	2018–19
Passenger	1570.4	1499.0
Freight	1934.4	2675.4
Sundry	204.5	207.0

- Gross includes passenger, freight, sundry and other coaching revenues

=== Awards and achievements ===
- Rail Vikas Bhavan, the office of the divisional railway manager was awarded platinum rating by Greening and Beautification Corporation of Andhra Pradesh.

== See also ==
- Divisions of Indian Railways
- Vijayawada railway division
