= Cumbum railway station =

Railway station in Andhra Pradesh, India

Cumbum

General information
- Location: Cumbum, Prakasam district, Andhra Pradesh; India
- Coordinates: 15°28′48″N 78°28′48″E
- System: Indian Railways Regional and Commuter rail station
- Owner: Indian Railways
- Operator: Indian Railways
- Line: Nallapadu–Nandyal section
- Platforms: 2 side platforms
- Tracks: 5 ft 6 in (1,676 mm) broad gauge Electrical

Construction
- Structure type: Standard (on ground)
- Accessible: Disabled access

Other information
- Station code: CBM
- Zone(s): South Central Railway
- Division(s): Guntur
- Classification: D

Services
Preceding station	Indian Railways	Following station
Tarlapadu towards ?	Nallapadu–Nandyal section	Jaggambotla Krishnapuram towards ?
Location
- Location within India Location within Andhra Pradesh

Cumbum railway station (station code:CBM) is a D-category Indian Railways station in the Guntur railway division of the South Central Railway zone. It is situated on the Nallapadu–Nandyal section and provides rail connectivity to the town of Cumbum. This railway station is used by residents of Cumbum, Bestavaripeta, Ardhaveedu, and Kanigiri. Trains from this station run to Nandyal, Hubli, Goa, Bengaluru, Hyderabad, Vijayawada, Visakhapatnam, Bhuvaneswar, and Kolkata. The railway passes by the historic Cumbum Tank starting from the Cumbum railway station for a distance of about 7 km.
