= Nadikudi =

Neighborhood of Dachepalli in Palnadu, Andhra Pradesh, India

- Neighborhood
- Interactive map of Nadikudi
- Location in Andhra Pradesh, India
- Coordinates: 16.58°N 79.57°E
- Country: India
- State: Andhra Pradesh
- District: Palnadu
- Mandal: Dachepalle

Government
  - Type: Municipality
  - Body: Dachepalle municipality

Area
  - Total: 1,996 ha (4,930 acres)

Population (2011)
  - Total: 17,238
  - Density: 863.6/km^{2} (2,237/sq mi)

Languages
  - Official: Telugu
- Time zone: UTC+5:30 (IST)
- PIN: 522xxx
- Area code: +91–
- Vehicle registration: AP

Nadikudi is a neighborhood of Dachepalle in Palnadu district of the Indian state of Andhra Pradesh.

== Geography ==
Nadikudi is situated to the west of the mandal headquarters, Dachepalle, at 16.58°N 79.57°E. It is spread over an area of 1,996 ha (4,930 acres).

== Governance ==
DACHEPALLI is a nagar panchayat(municipality) from January 2020 formed municipality or nagar panchayat by Andhrapradesh government order.

== Education ==
As per the school information report for the academic year 2018–19, the village has a total of 13 schools. These schools include 7 MPP and 6 private schools.
