= Cumbum, Andhra Pradesh =

Cumbum Mandalam
- Town
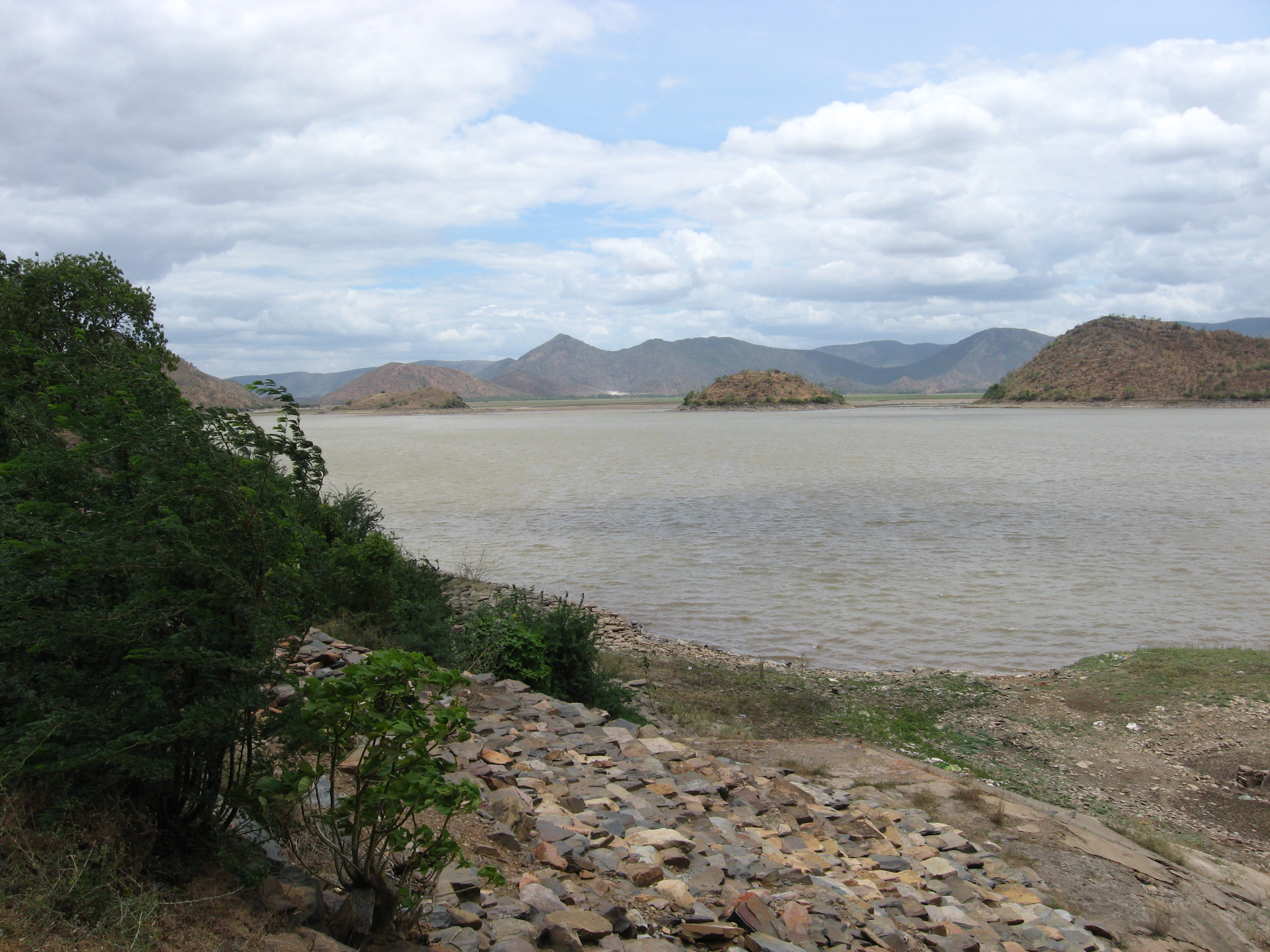
- Cumbum Lake

- Location in Andhra Pradesh, India
- Coordinates: 15.5667°N 79.1167°E
- Country: India
- State: Andhra Pradesh
- District: Markapuram
- Mandal: Cumbum
- Established: 15th Century
- Founder: Shrikrishna Devaraya

Area
  - Total: 8.81 km^{2} (3.40 sq mi)

Population (2011)
  - Total: 15,169
  - Density: 1,720/km^{2} (4,460/sq mi)

Languages
  - Official: Telugu
- Time zone: UTC+5:30 (IST)
- PIN: 523333
- Telephone code: +91–8406
- Vehicle registration: AP

Cumbum, natively spelt as Kambham, (Note: Cumbum is the anglicized spelling used in British English, and kaṁbhaṁ is the romanized spelling from Telugu script used in Indian English.) is a census town in Markapuram district of the Indian state of Andhra Pradesh. It is the headquarters of Cumbum mandal in Markapur revenue division. It was a part of Kurnool district before it was merged into Prakasam district. It is now part of Markapuram district.

== Cumbum Lake ==
Cumbum Lake, also known as Gundlakamma Lake, was built on the Gundlakamma rivulet upon the Nallamala hills. It is one of the oldest man-made lakes in Asia. The anicut was built by the Vijayanagar Princess Varadharajamma (also known as Ruchidevi), wife of Sri Krishna Devaraya. She was also the daughter of Gajapatis of Odisha. The lake is about 7 kilometres (4.3 mi) long and about 3.5 kilometres (2.2 mi) wide. According to the Imperial Gazette of India, at the turn of the 20th century, the dam was 57 feet (17 m) tall, and the drainage area was 430 square miles (1,100 km^{2}). At present the lake has an effective storage capacity of 3.38 tmc ft. The directly irrigated land is about 10,300 acres (42 km^{2}) in all. It is the second largest irrigation tank in Asia. Cumbum Lake is accessible both by the Guntur-Nandyal railway line and from Ongole by road.

== History ==
There are inscriptions at Cumbum and Bestavaripeta, one from 1706 , and another from 1729. The first refers to the death of the sheriff Khaja Muhammad, who was the Qiladar of Cumbum fort during the reign of Aurangazeb. The second refers to Muhammad Sahib, son of Muhammad Khayum of Tab and governor of Cumbum during the reign of Muhammad Shah. It also states that Muhammad Sahib had a mosque constructed at Cumbum during his governorship. These inscriptions prove that this district, like other districts in the Qutub Shahi Kingdom, was once under the Mughal rule. It was formed as part of the Golkonda province, one of the six provinces into which the Deccan Suba was sub-divided.

During the British rule, Cumbum tehsil was a municipality of Kurnool district; as such, it had a regimental garrison and a collectorate. On 10 June 1846, Uyyalawada Narasimha Reddy raided the treasury at Cumbum, and started rebellion against the British.

== Geography ==
Cumbum is located at 15.5669°N 79.1167°E. It has an average elevation of 184 metres (606 ft).

== Transport ==
Cumbum railway station provides rail connectivity and is a D-category railway station in the Guntur railway division of the South Central Railway zone. State highways, roads, and the Guntur–Guntakal railway line pass through the town.

== International recognition by UNESCO ==
The Cumbum Tank was made a World Heritage Irrigation Structure (WHIS) in 2020 by UNESCO.

== Politics ==
The town was an assembly constituency in Andhra Pradesh until 2009. Anna Venkata Rambabu won the 2019 assembly elections when the Cumbum constituency was reorganized and merged with the Giddalur constituency.

== Education ==
The primary and secondary school education is provided by the government's School Education Department. The languages of instruction followed by different schools are English and Telugu.
