= Vinukonda railway station =

Railway station in Andhra Pradesh, India

Vinukonda

General information
- Location: Narasaropet Road, Vinukonda, Palnadu district, Andhra Pradesh; India
- Coordinates: 16.0505°N 79.7478°E
- System: Railway Station
- Owner: Indian Railways
- Operator: Indian Railways
- Line: Nallapadu–Nandyal section
- Platforms: 3
- Tracks: 2
- Train operators: IRCTC

Construction
- Structure type: On ground
- Parking: Available
- Accessible: Disabled access

Other information
- Status: Active
- Station code: VKN
- Zone(s): South Central Railway zone
- Division(s): Guntur
- Website: irctc.com

History
- Opened: Before 2000
- Closed: Not Yet

Services
| Preceding station | Indian Railways | Following station |
|---|---|---|
| Savalyapuram towards ? | Nallapadu–Nandyal section | Cheekategalapalem towards ? |
Location
- Location within Andhra Pradesh Location within India

Vinukonda railway station (station code:VKN), is an Indian Railways station in Vinukonda of Andhra Pradesh. It lies on the Nallapadu–Nandyal section and is administered under Guntur railway division of South Central Railway zone. It is one of the stations in the division to be equipped with Automatic Ticket Vending Machines (ATVM's).

== See also ==
- List of railway stations in India
