= Piduguralla railway station =

Railway Station in PIDUGURALLA Municipality

Piduguralla
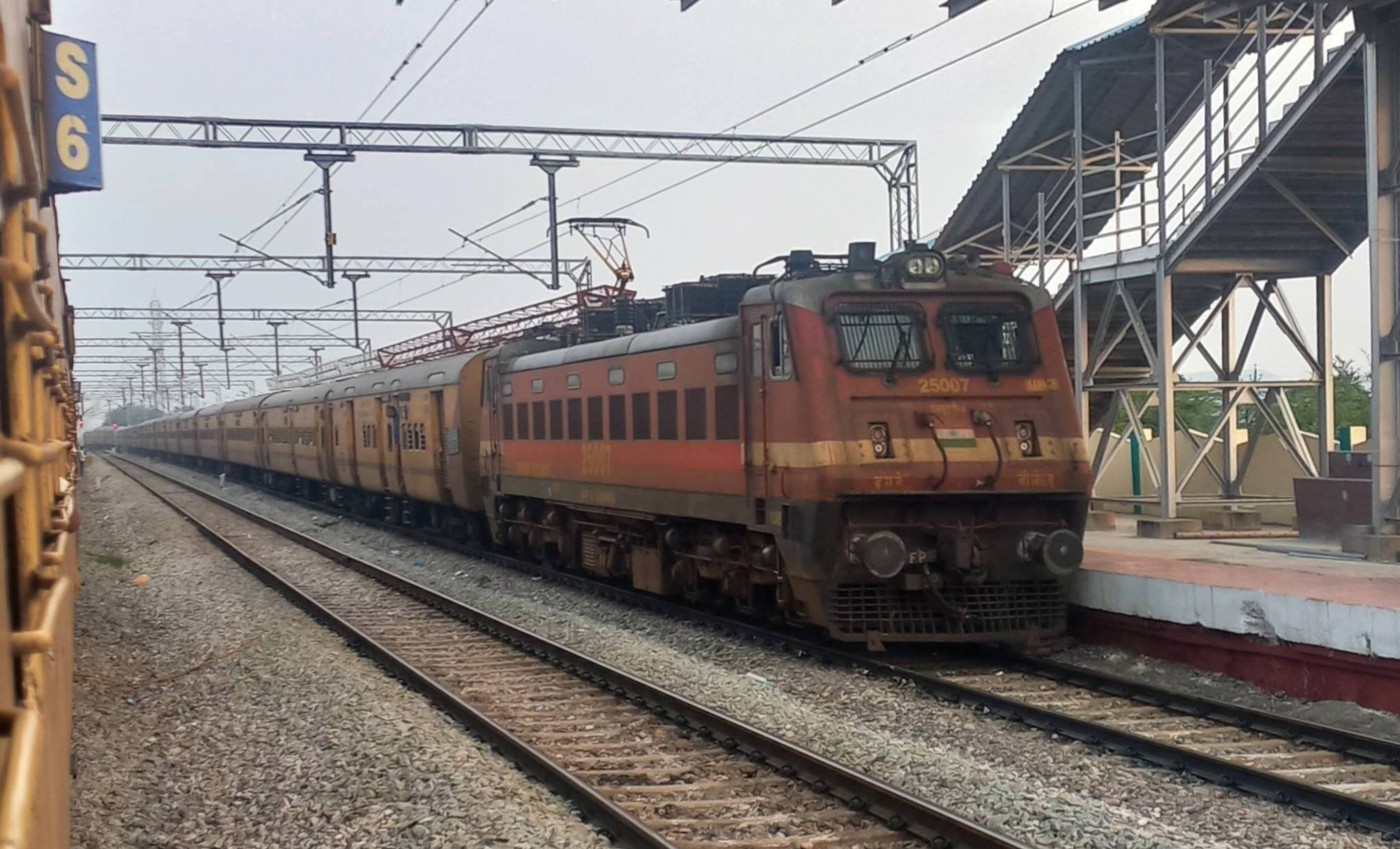

General information
- Location: Piduguralla, Palnadu district, Andhra Pradesh; India
- Coordinates: 16°34′38″N 80°33′45″E
- System: Commuter, Inter-city and Regional rail station
- Owner: Indian Railways
- Operator: Indian Railways
- Line: Pagidipalli–Nallapadu section
- Platforms: 2
- Tracks: 5 ft 6 in (1,676 mm) broad gauge

Construction
- Structure type: Standard (on ground)
- Accessible: Disabled access

Other information
- Station code: PGRL
- Zone(s): SCoR
- Division(s): Guntur

Services
Preceding station	Indian Railways	Following station
Kamepalli towards ?	Pagidipalli–Nallapadu section	Anupalem towards ?
Route map
Location
- Location within Andhra Pradesh Location within India

Piduguralla railway station (station code:PGRL), is an Indian Railway station in Piduguralla of Palnadu District in Andhra Pradesh. It is situated on Pagidipalli–Nallapadu section and is administered by Guntur railway division of South Coast Railway zone. It is selected as one of the station to be developed under Adarsh station scheme.

== See also ==
- List of railway stations in India
