= Nallamala Hills =

Mountain range in India

- The Nallamalas
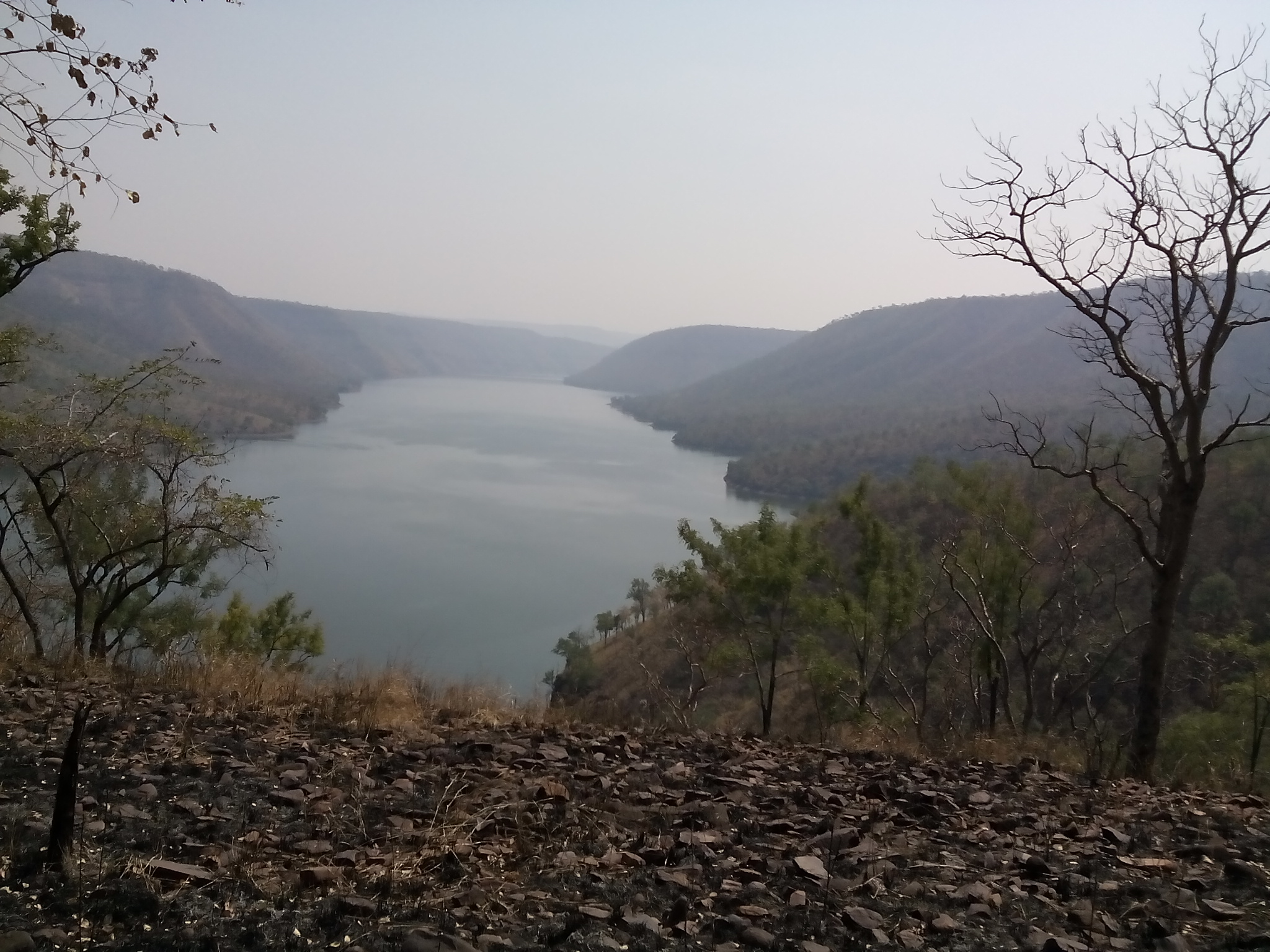
- The Nallamalas Hills

Highest point
- Peak: Bhairani Konda (Sikhareswaram)
- Elevation: 3,608 ft (1,100 m)
- Coordinates: 15°40′41″N 78°47′10″E

Dimensions
- Length: 90 mi (140 km) north-south

Geography
- Location within Andhra Pradesh
- Country: India
- Provinces/States: Andhra Pradesh and Telangana

Geology
- Rock age: Proterozoic

The Nallamalas (also called the Nallamalla Range) are a section of the Eastern Ghats which forms the eastern boundary of Rayalaseema region of the state of Andhra Pradesh and Nagarkurnool district of the state of Telangana, in India. They run in a nearly north–south alignment, parallel to the Coromandel Coast for close to 430 km between th rivers, Krishna and Pennar. Its northern boundaries are marked by the flat Palnadu basin while in the south it merges with the Tirupati hills. An extremely old system, the hills have extensively weathered and eroded over the years. The average elevation today is about 520 m which reaches 1100 m at Bhairani Konda and 1048 m at Gundla Brahmeswara. Both of these peaks are in a north westerly direction from the town of Cumbum. There are also many other peaks above 800m. There are several sites in this forest such as Ahobilam and Tungabhadra valley.

== Geology ==
The rocks of the Nallamala ranges belong to the Kadapa system which is a series some 20,000 ft. thick. The main rocks are quartzite overlaid with an uneven slaty formation. Some sandstone is also to be found. The rocks here are very irregular and soft in texture thus making commercial exploitation impossible. These rocks are among the oldest in the world and have been formed as a result of large scale volcanic activity hundreds of millions of years ago. The evidence of the volcanic forces are evident in the foldings into which the rocks have been forced. Rock age : proterozoic

== Climate ==
The Nallamalas have a rather warm to hot climate throughout the year. Rainfall averages about 90 cm and is concentrated in the months of the Southwest monsoon (June–September). The fissured rocks prevent any water from percolating underground and hence most of the discharge runs off as mountain streams to join the Gundlakamma River, the largest river to arise in these hills. Winters are mostly cool and dry with the average temperature around 25 degrees Celsius. Summers are very hot, with temperatures as high as 45 degrees Celsius.

== Gallery ==
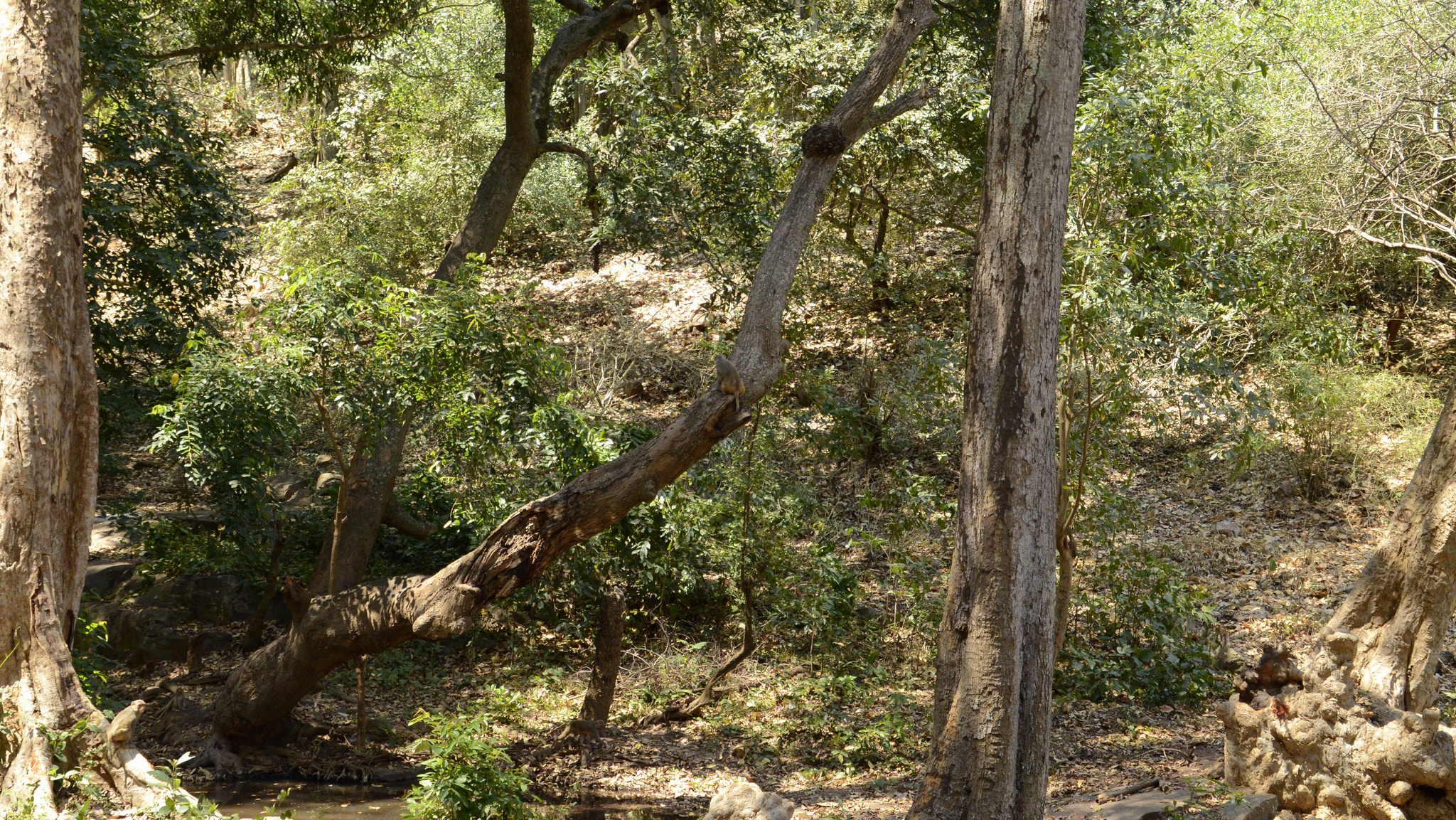
Nallamalla forests at Srisailam

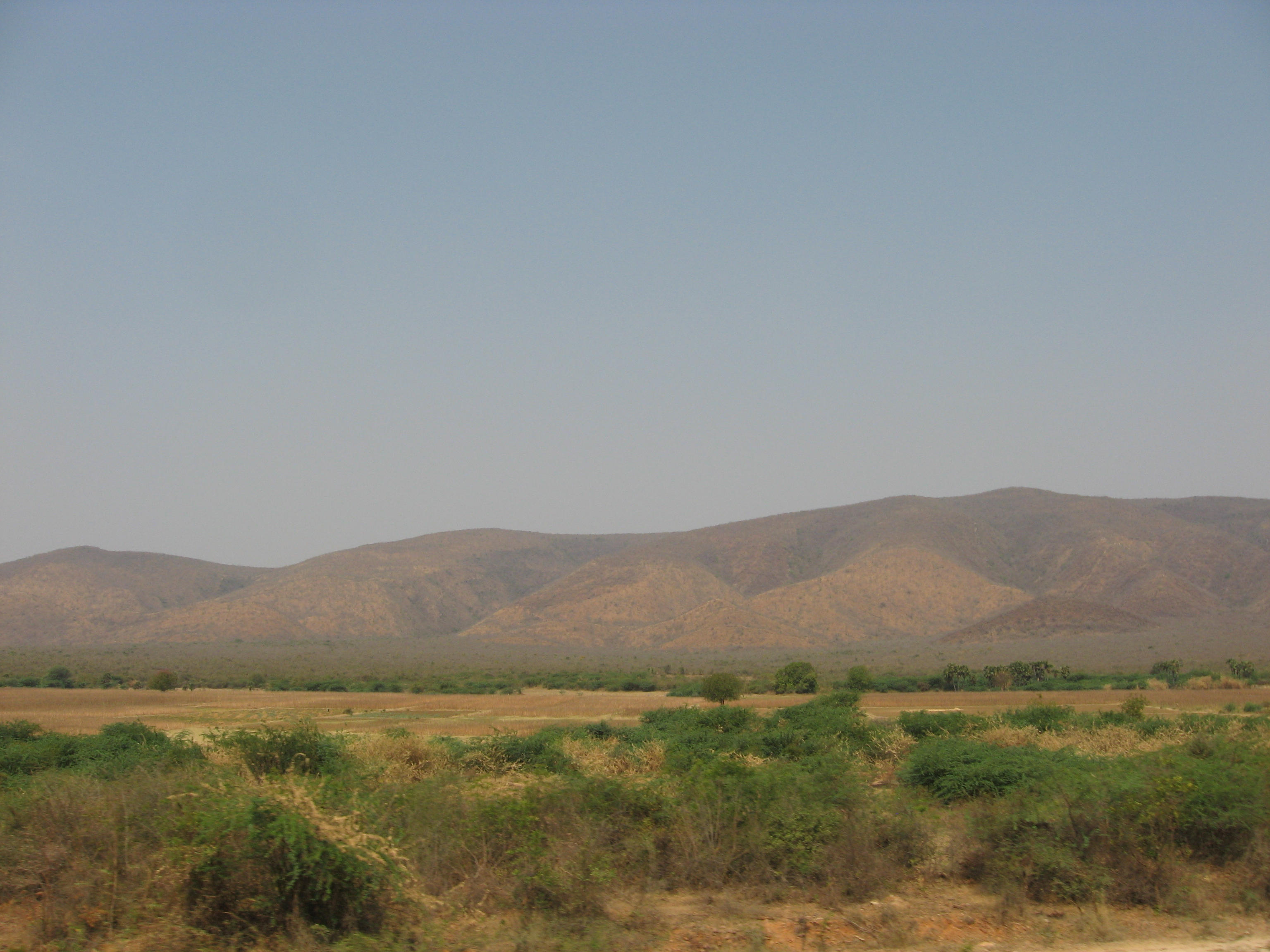
The Nallamallas from a distance during the dry season

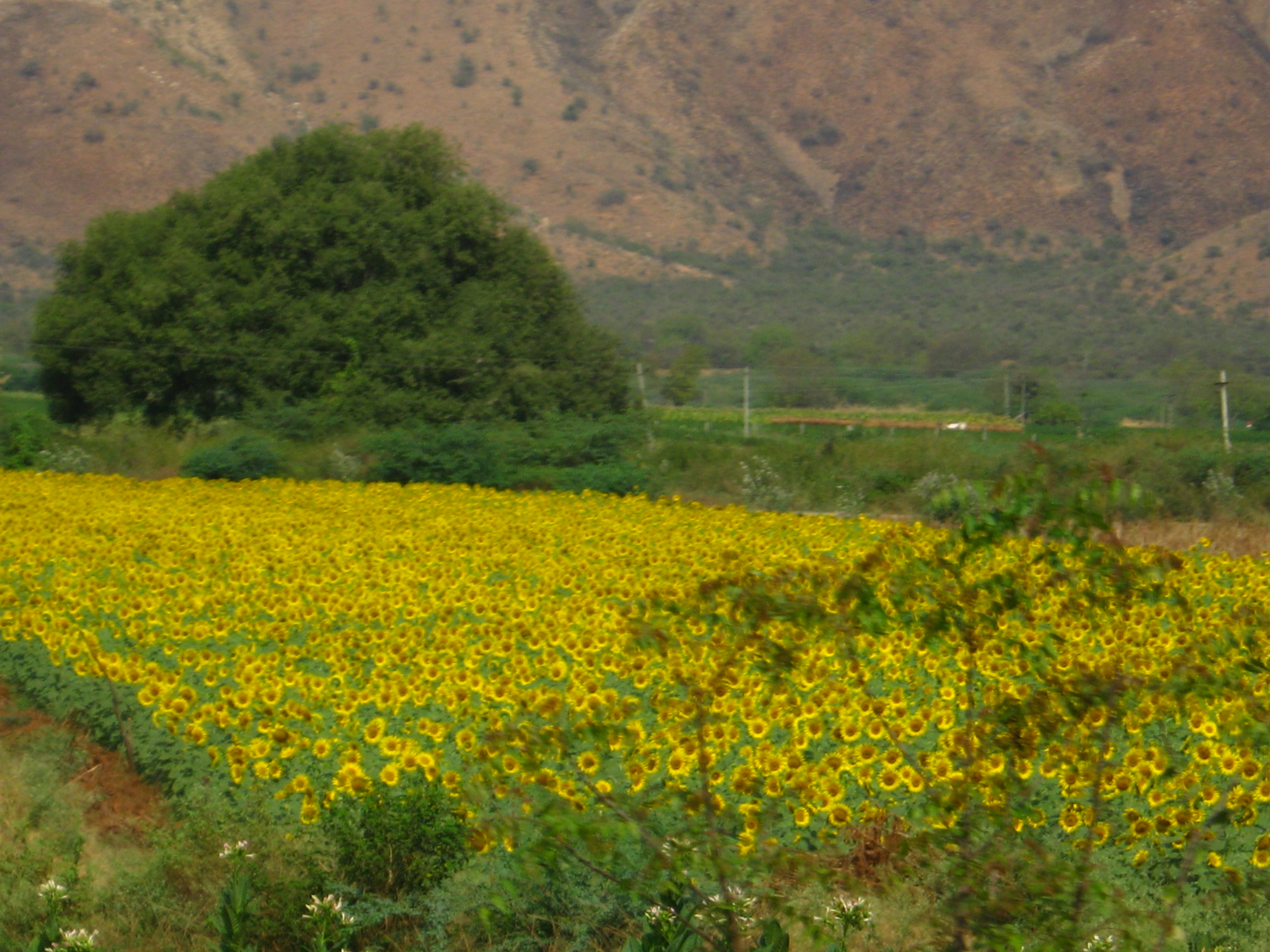
Sunflower cultivation at the foot of Cumbum at the Nallamalas

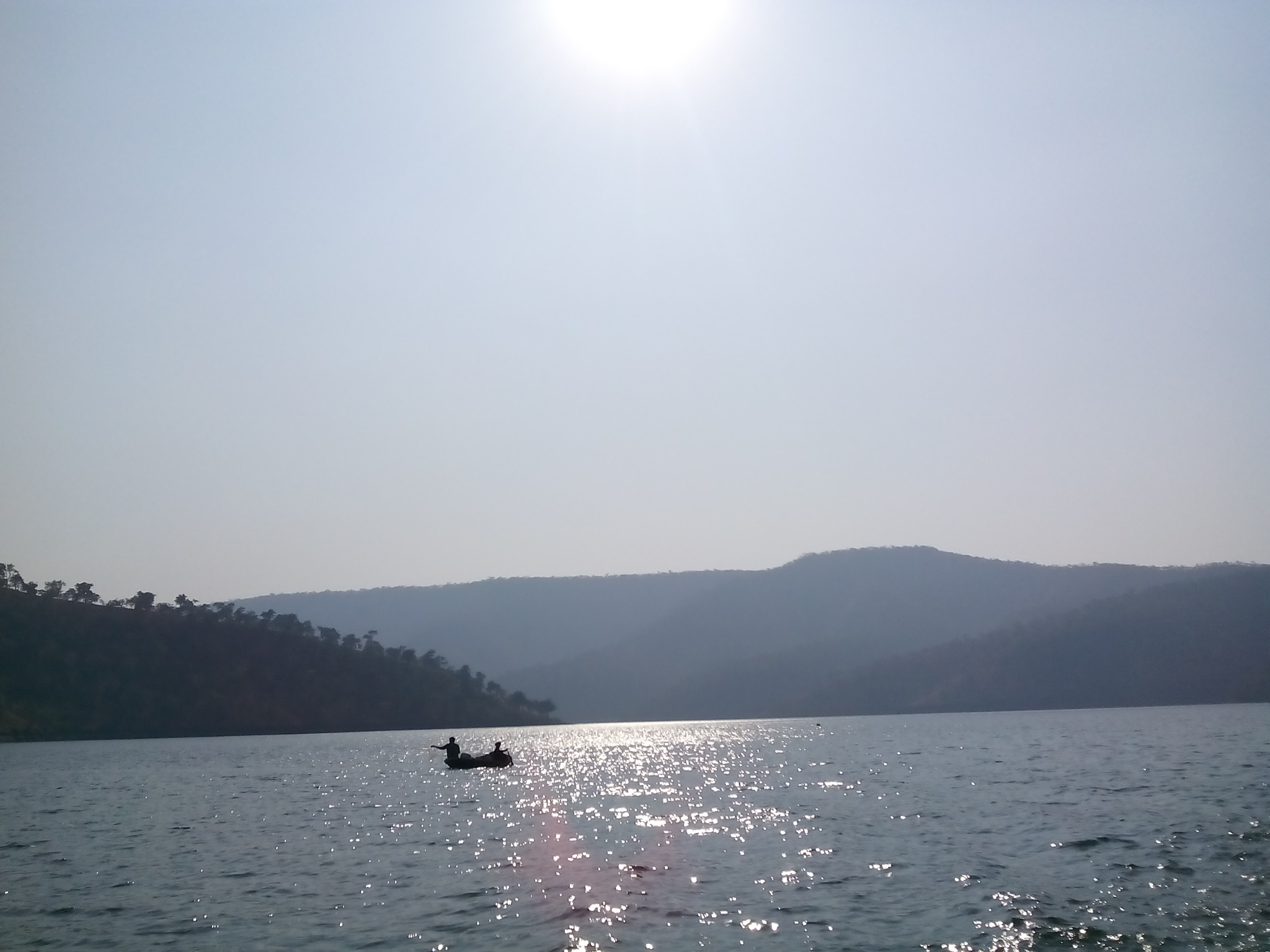
After noon in Nallamalla Forest

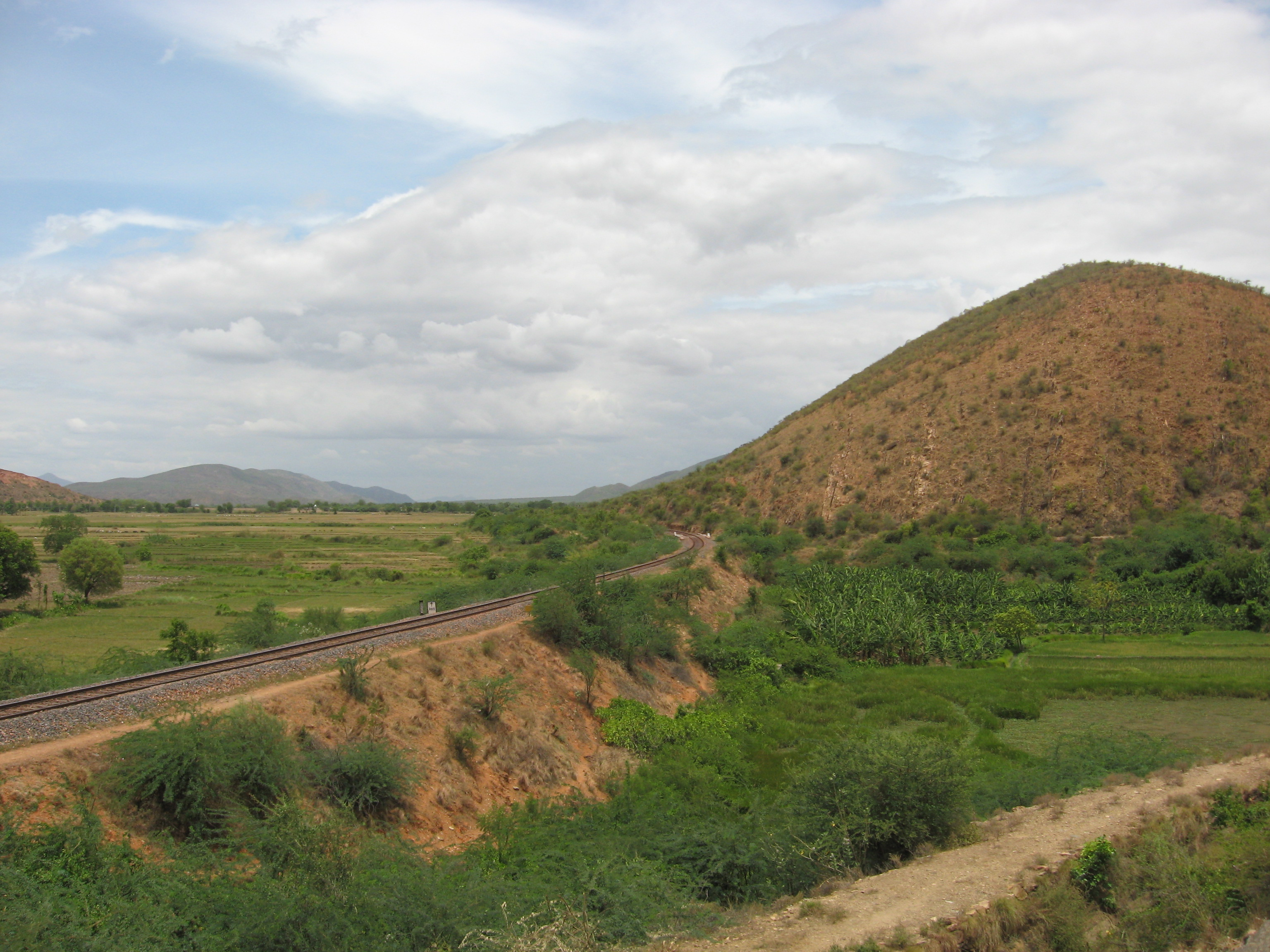
The railway curves into the Nallamalas at the Nandikamma Pass, Cumbum

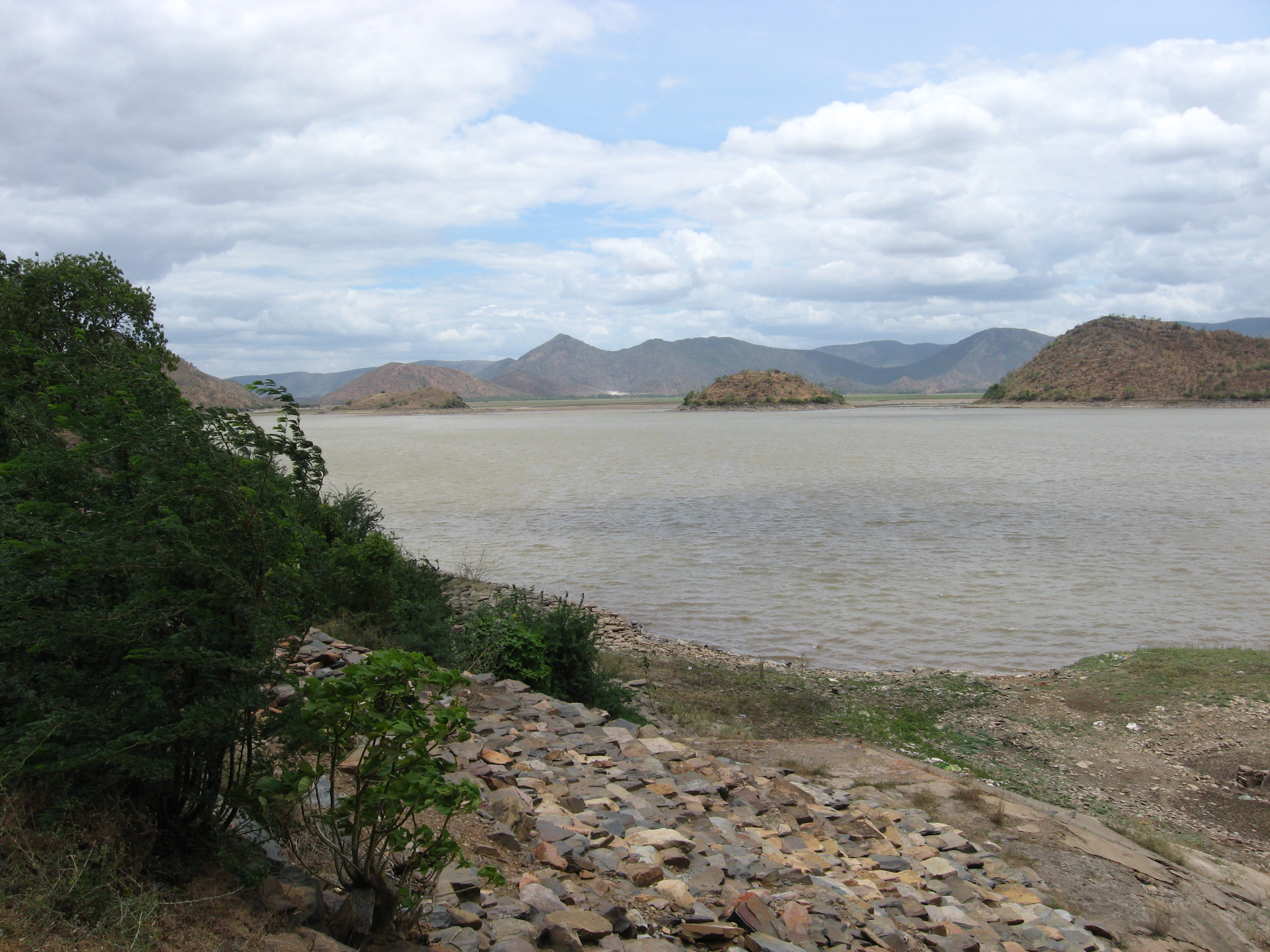
A view of the Cumbum Lake

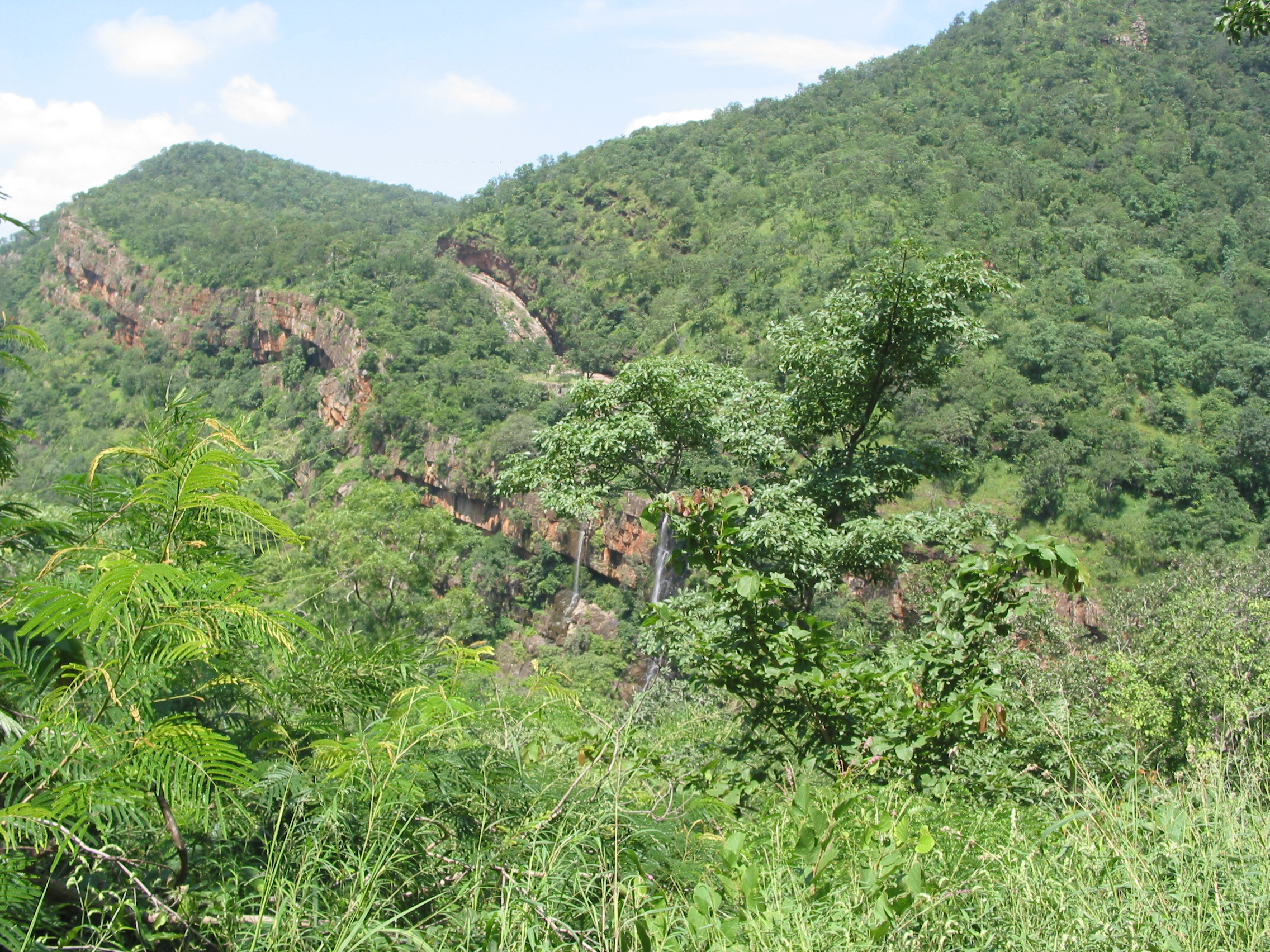
Nallamalla forests at Ahobilam

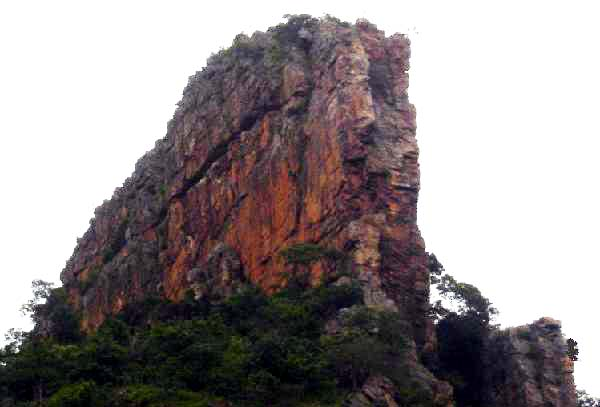
Ugra stambham rock at Ahobilam

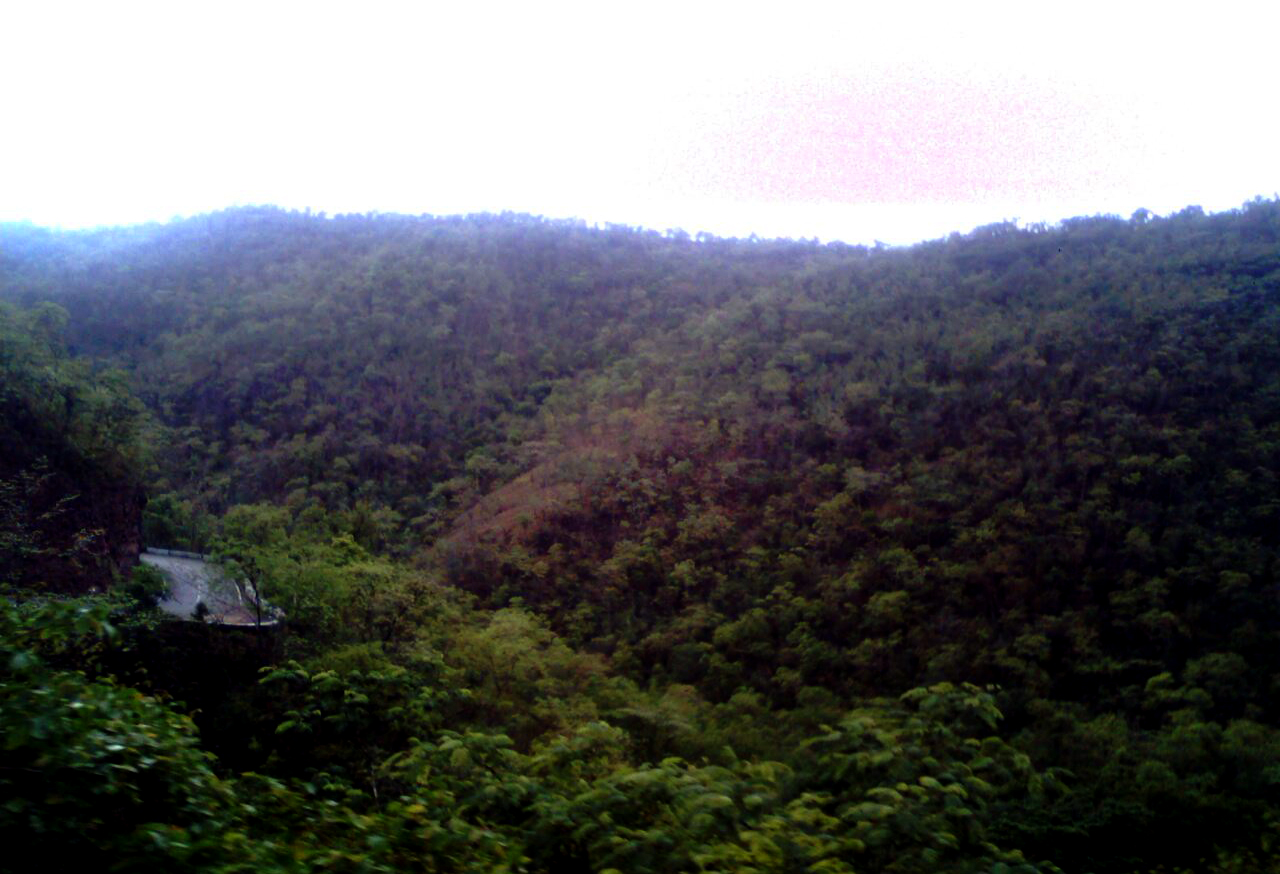
Nallamalla hills on rainy day near Atmakur

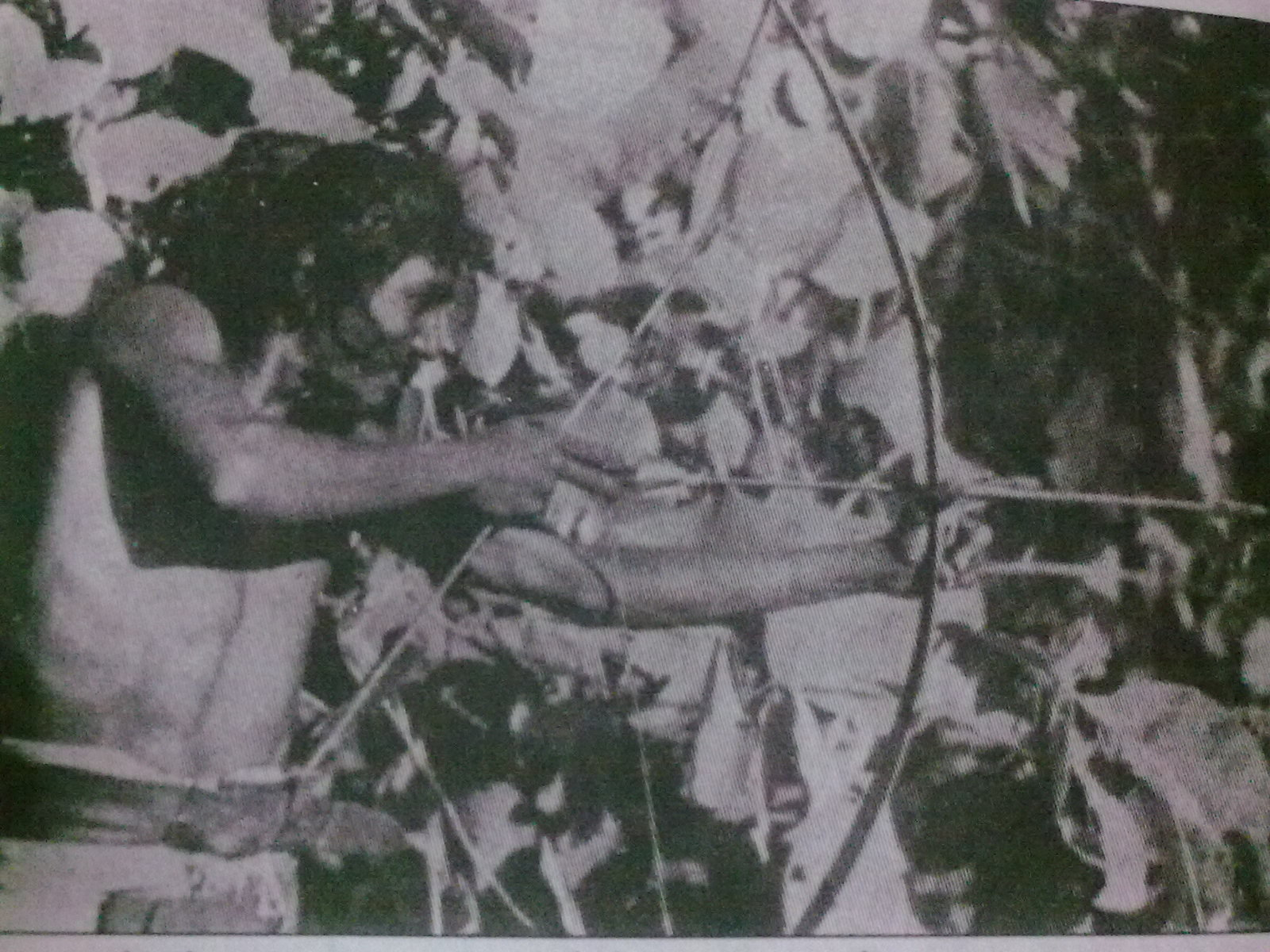
Chenchu tribal hunting picture from Nallamala Hills

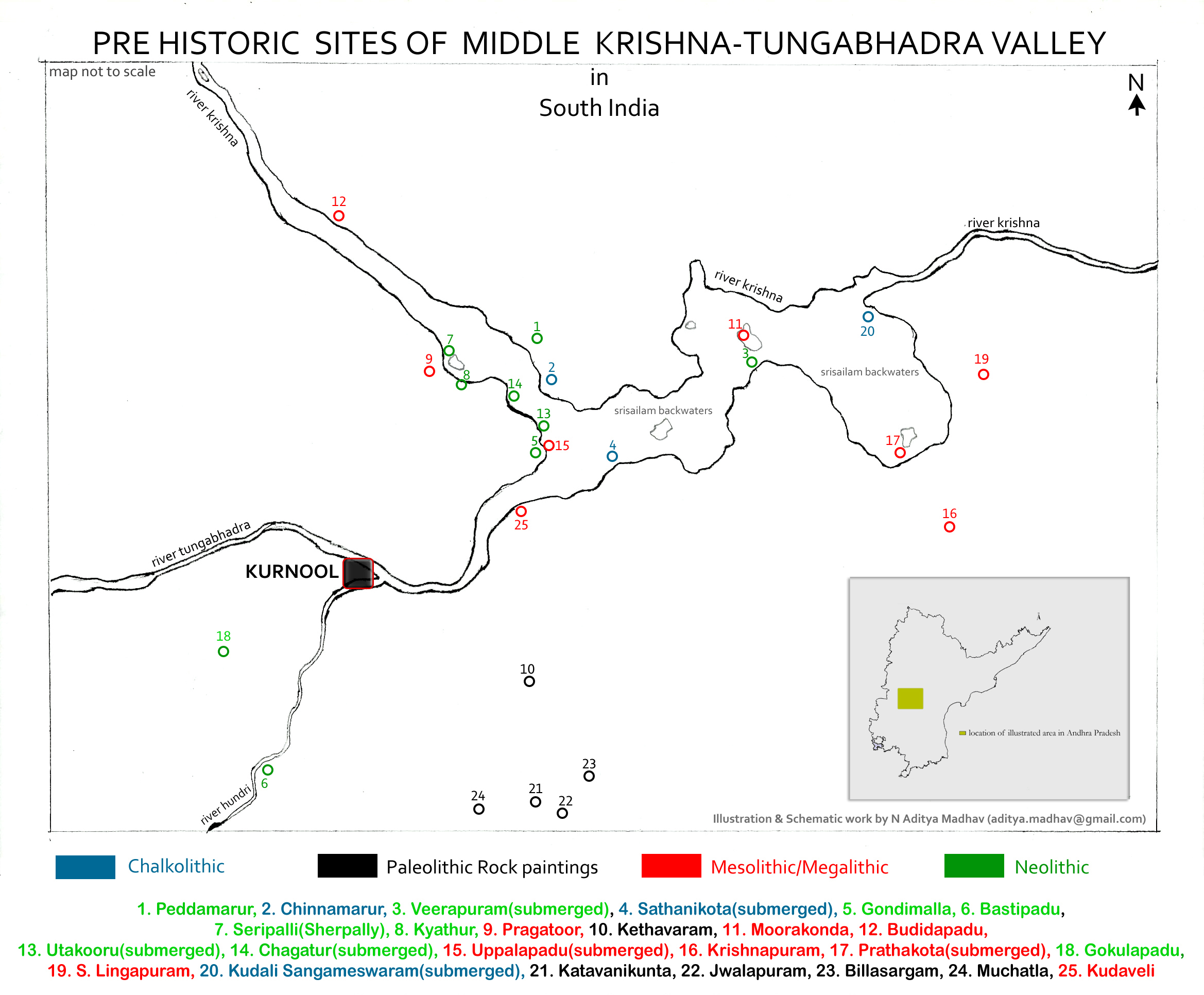
Pre Historic Mid Krishna-Tungabhadra Valley sites

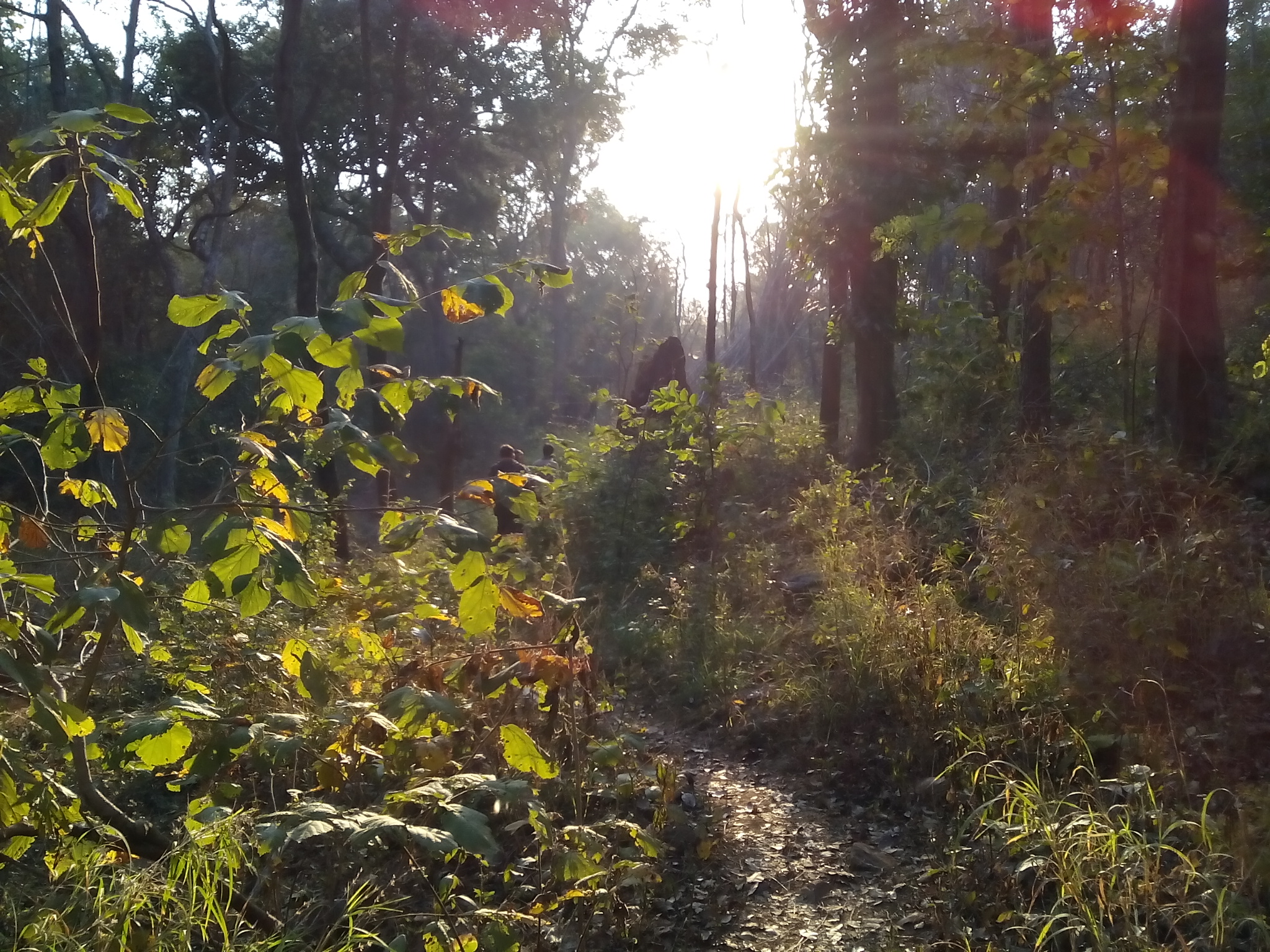
Morning in Nallamalla Forest

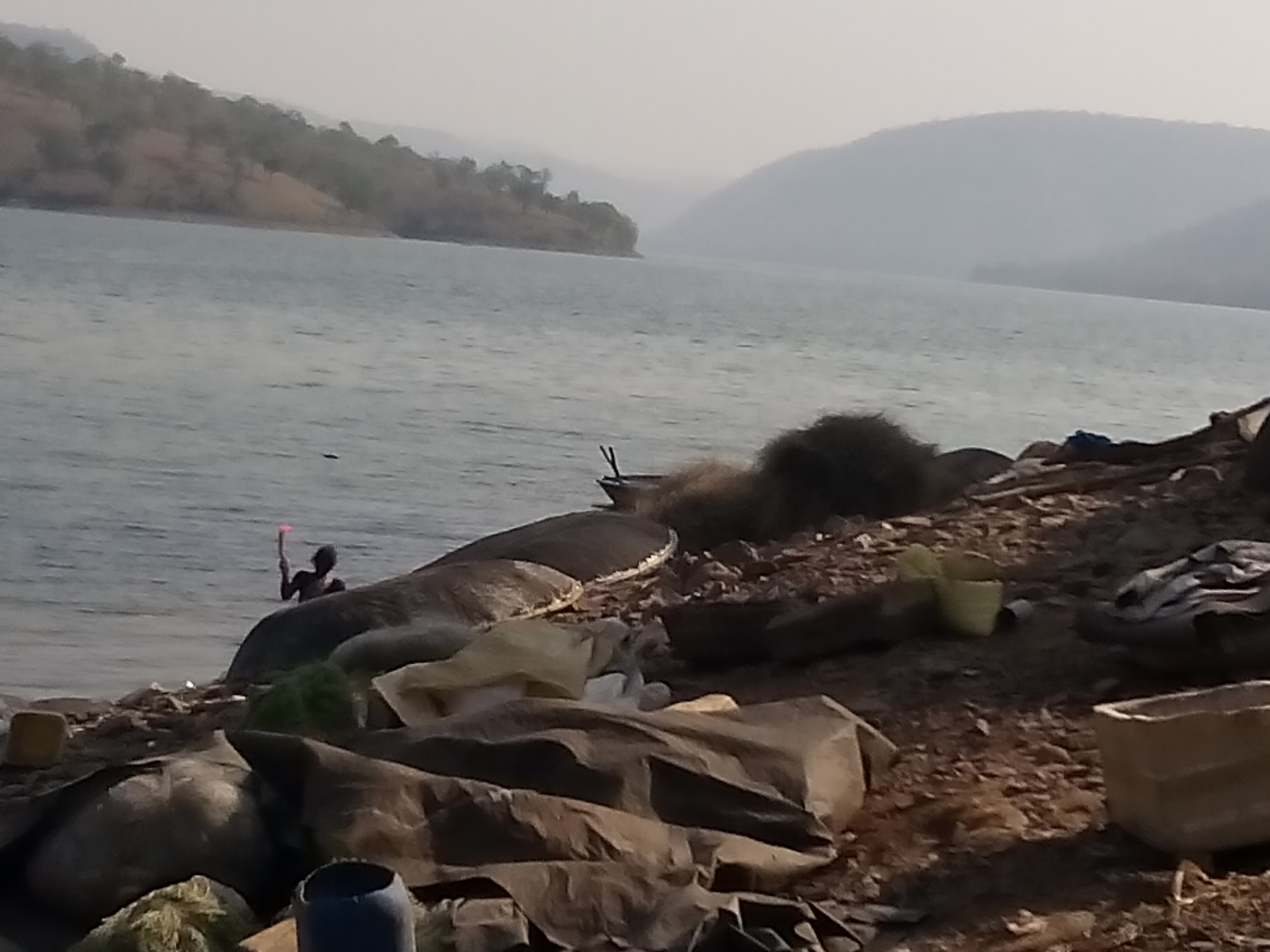
Tribals staying in Nallamalla Forest

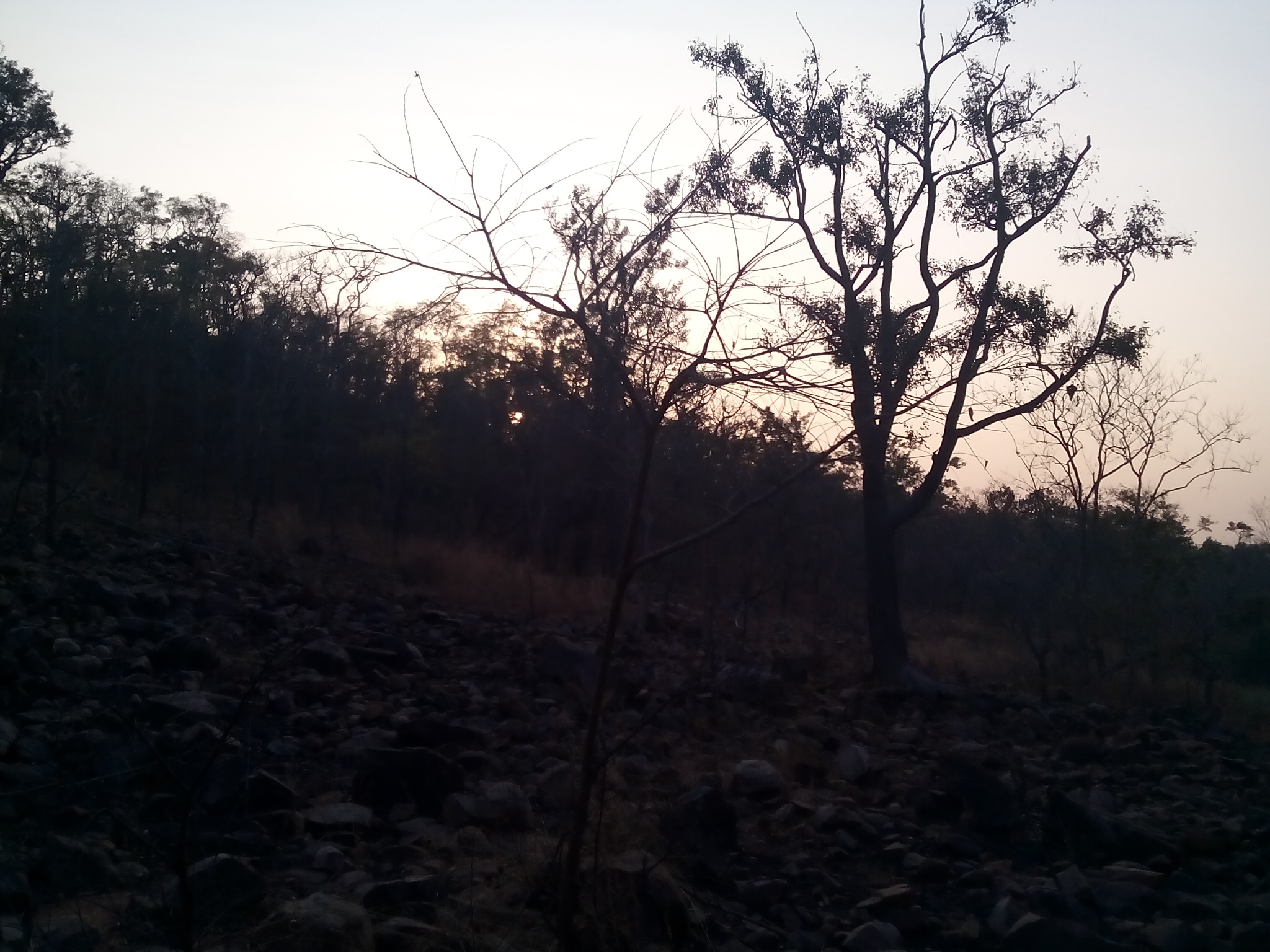
view on Sun set time

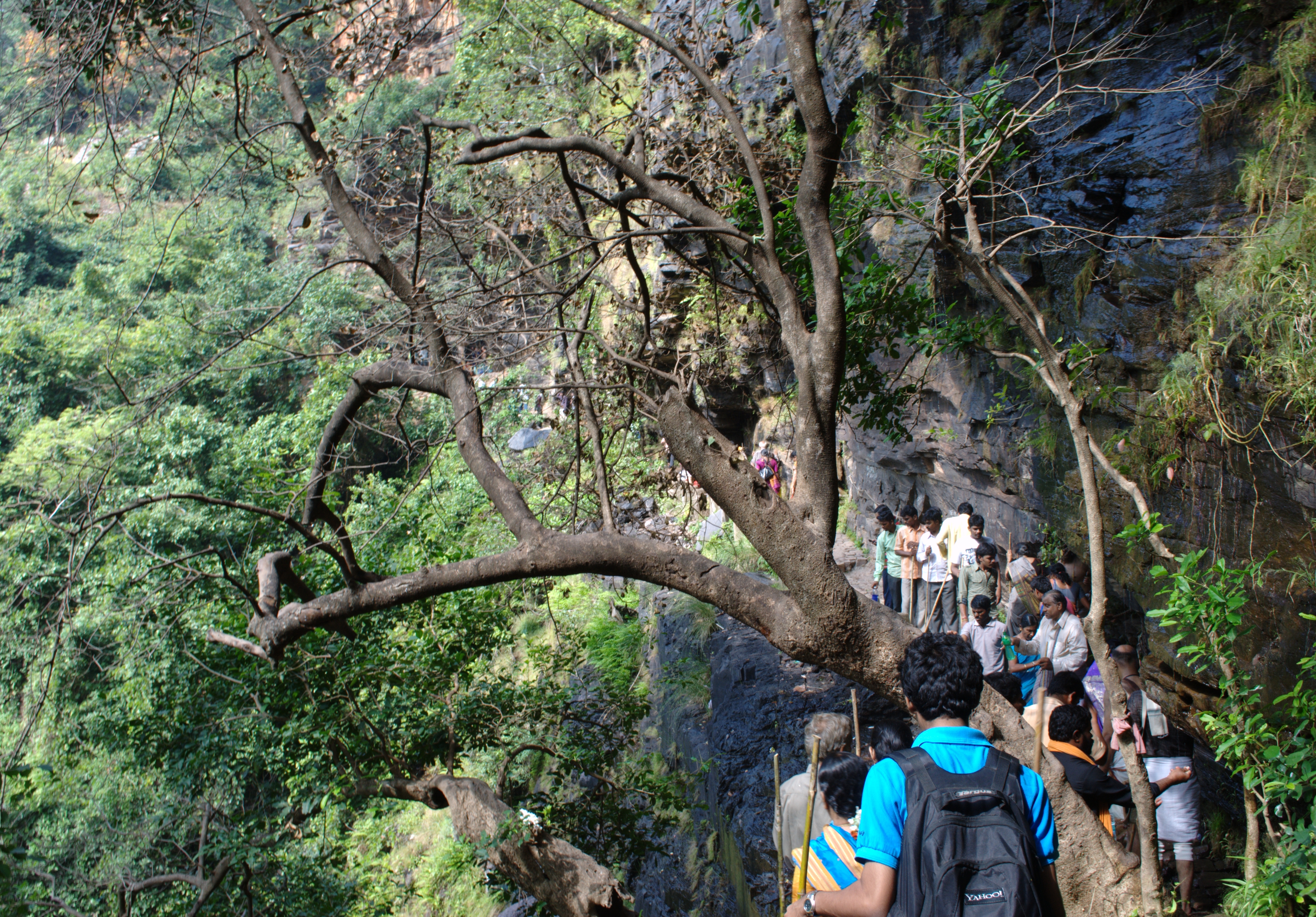
Trek to Ugra stambham at Ahobilam in Nallamala Forests

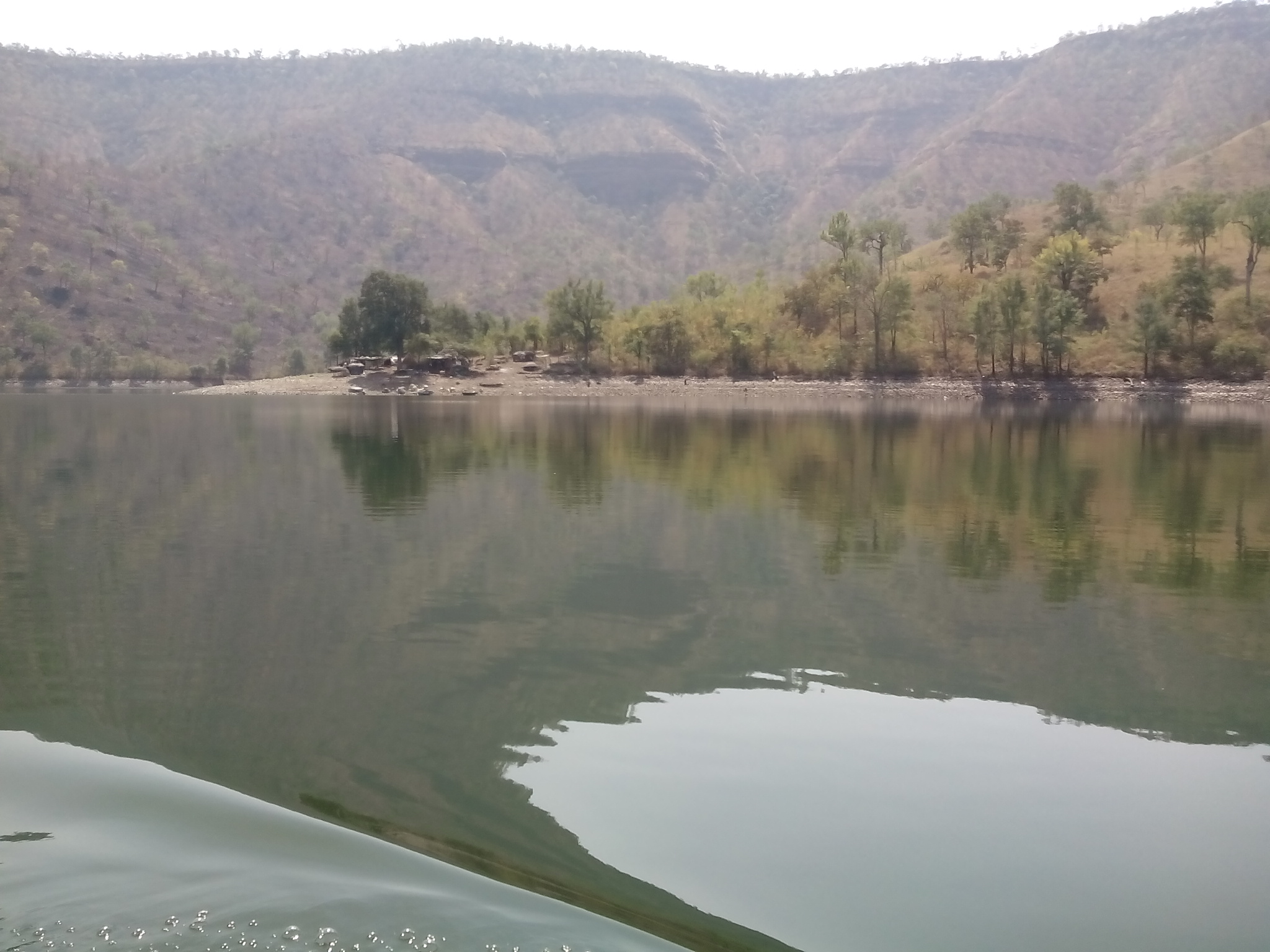
View From Boat Journey towards caves

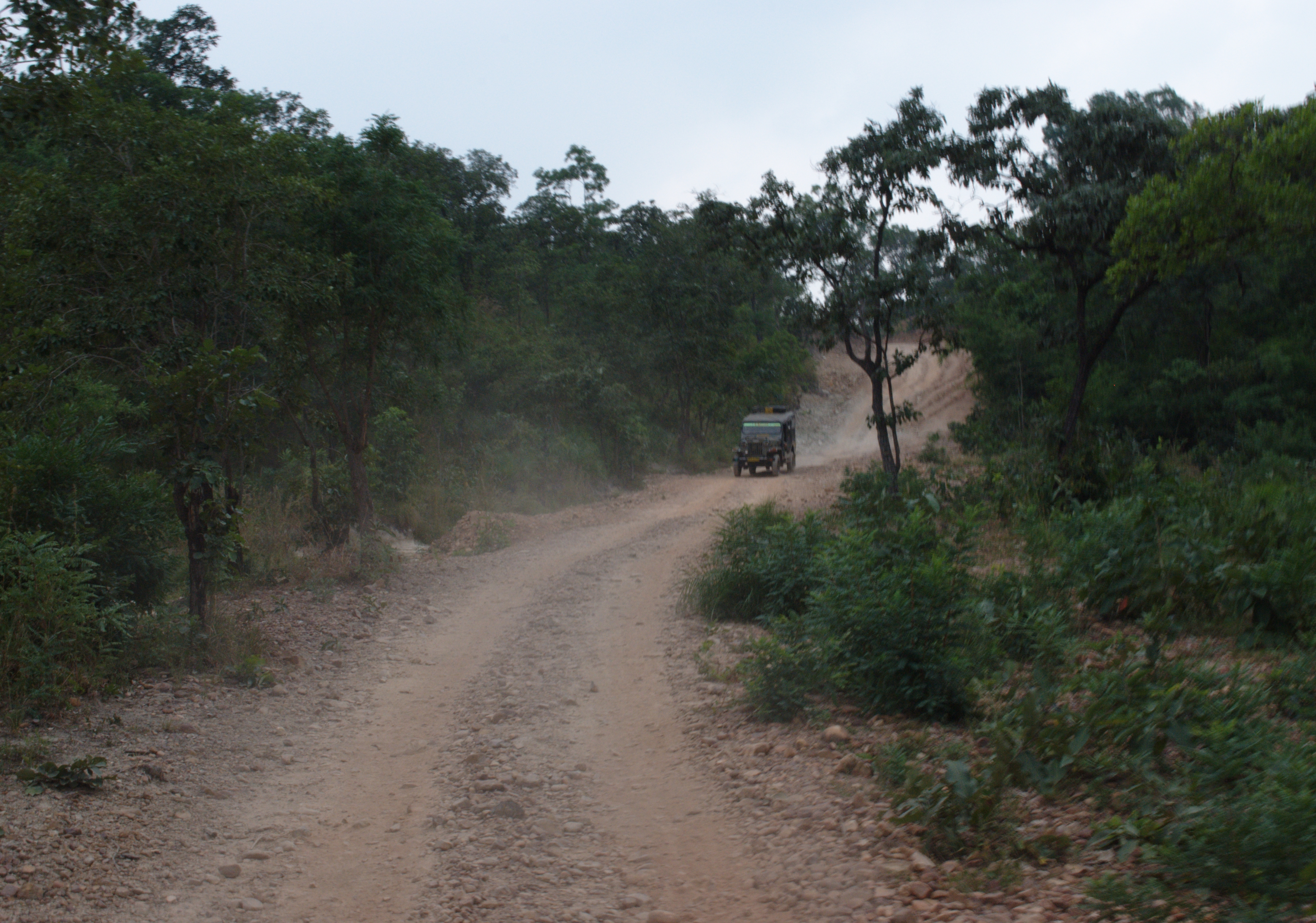
Dirt road along Nallamala Forests near Ahobilam

== Flora and fauna ==
These hills are almost completely covered with open jungle. Lack of water prevents the growth of large trees and the prevalent vegetation consists of dry deciduous forest with the trees Terminalia, Hardwickia and Pterocarpus predominant. Agriculture is almost non existent apart from isolated patches near villages where subsistence farming is practiced. The Nallamala Forests are probably the largest stretch of undisturbed forest in South India apart from the Western Ghats and were particularly rich in game till the 1970s. A large part of the forest is a part of the Nagarjunsagar-Srisailam Tiger Reserve that has a viable tiger population. Leopard sightings too are not uncommon. Many of the adventures of the popular wildlife writer, Kenneth Anderson are set in these forests.

== Population ==
The uneven terrain and the scarcity of water has prevented the growth of any large cities in this region. Nandyal is the largest city in this region. The indigenous population consists of the Chenchus, a forest dwelling tribe who have remained cut off from the modern world even today. Farming is the primary occupation of the people in the plateaus while the Chenchus are still hunter gatherers. The hills were a hotbed of Naxal activities until recently. Police action since 2005 has all but cleared the forest of them.

== Transport ==
A state highway and the Nallapadu-Nandyal line of the Guntur railway division pass through the hills. The railway was first built by the Madras and Southern Mahratta Railway and is a feat of engineering, having 2 tunnels at Bogada and Chelama and a few viaducts, the most famous being the now abandoned Dorabavi Viaduct. The railway enters the hills at the Nandikama Pass near Cumbum Lake. The highway follows a zig zag alignment and thus avoids any tunnels. The primary exports of this region are forest produce like timber waste, honey and molasses.

== Places of interest ==
Srisailam on the River Krishna is the site of a large hydroelectric power project as also an ancient temple dedicated to Lord Shiva. Mahanandi temple and Ahobilam Nava Narsimha Temples are situated here. A stream descends down the Gundla Brahmeswara peak and ends in a waterfall and sacred pool called Nemaligundam (Peacock Pool). The Mallela Theertham waterfall on the river Krishna is also located in this forest.

The Cumbum Lake is one of Asia's oldest man made lakes and dates back to the 15th century. It was built by the Gajapati kings of Orissa for irrigating about 420 km^{2} farmland by damming a narrow opening between two adjoining hills and later renovated by queen Vardarajamma of Vijayanagara kingdom in the 16th century.

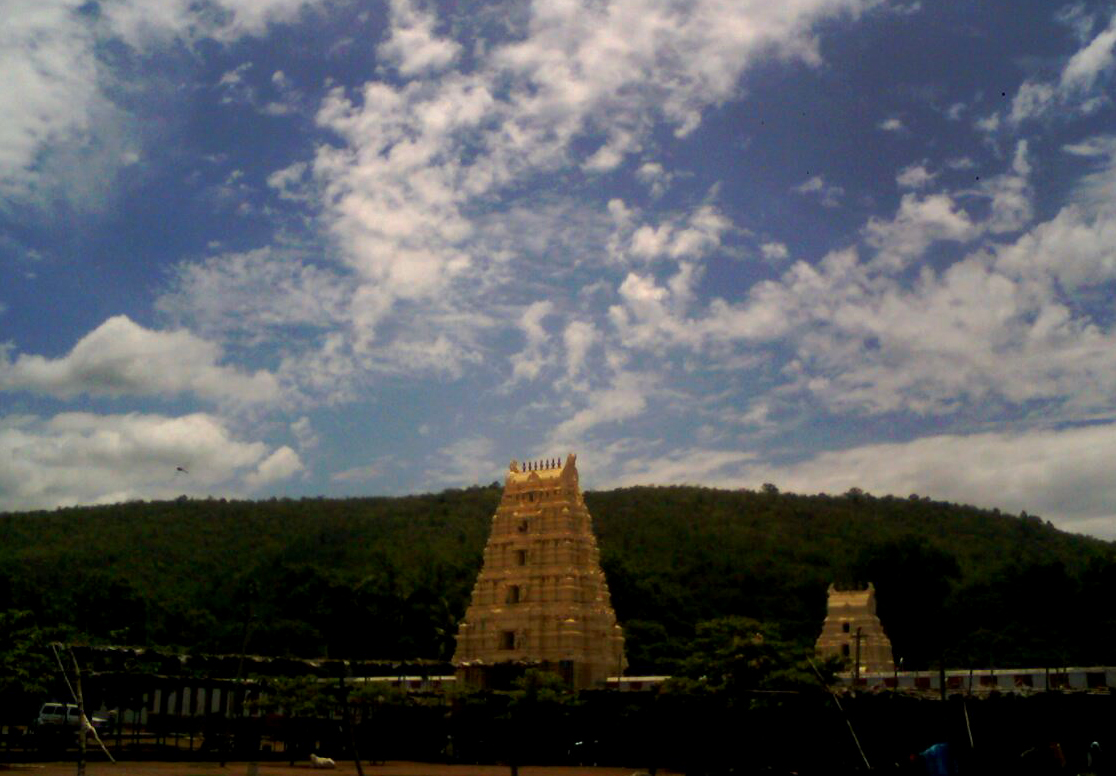
Mahanandi Temple along the foothills of Nallamala

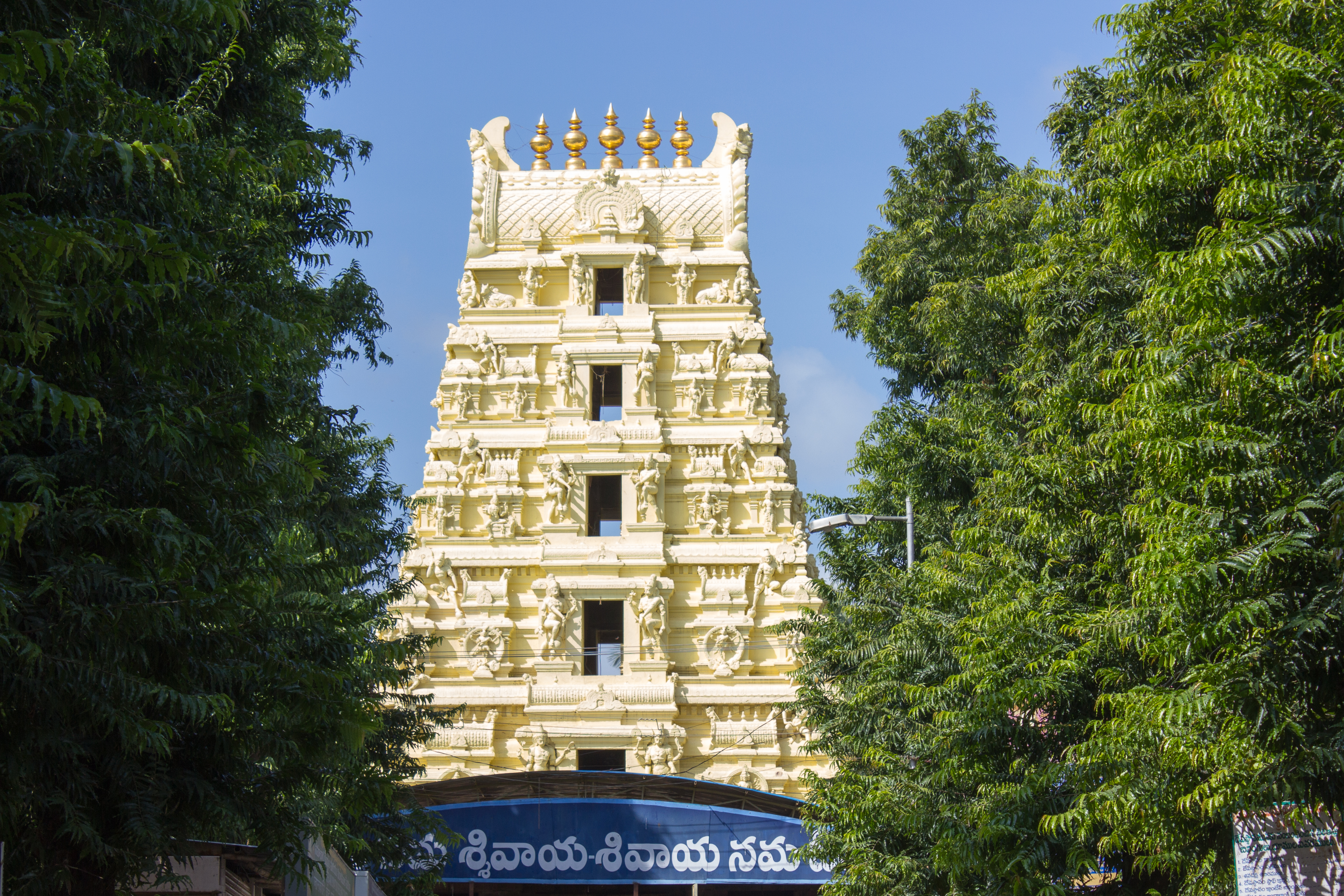
Srisailam Entrance Gopuram

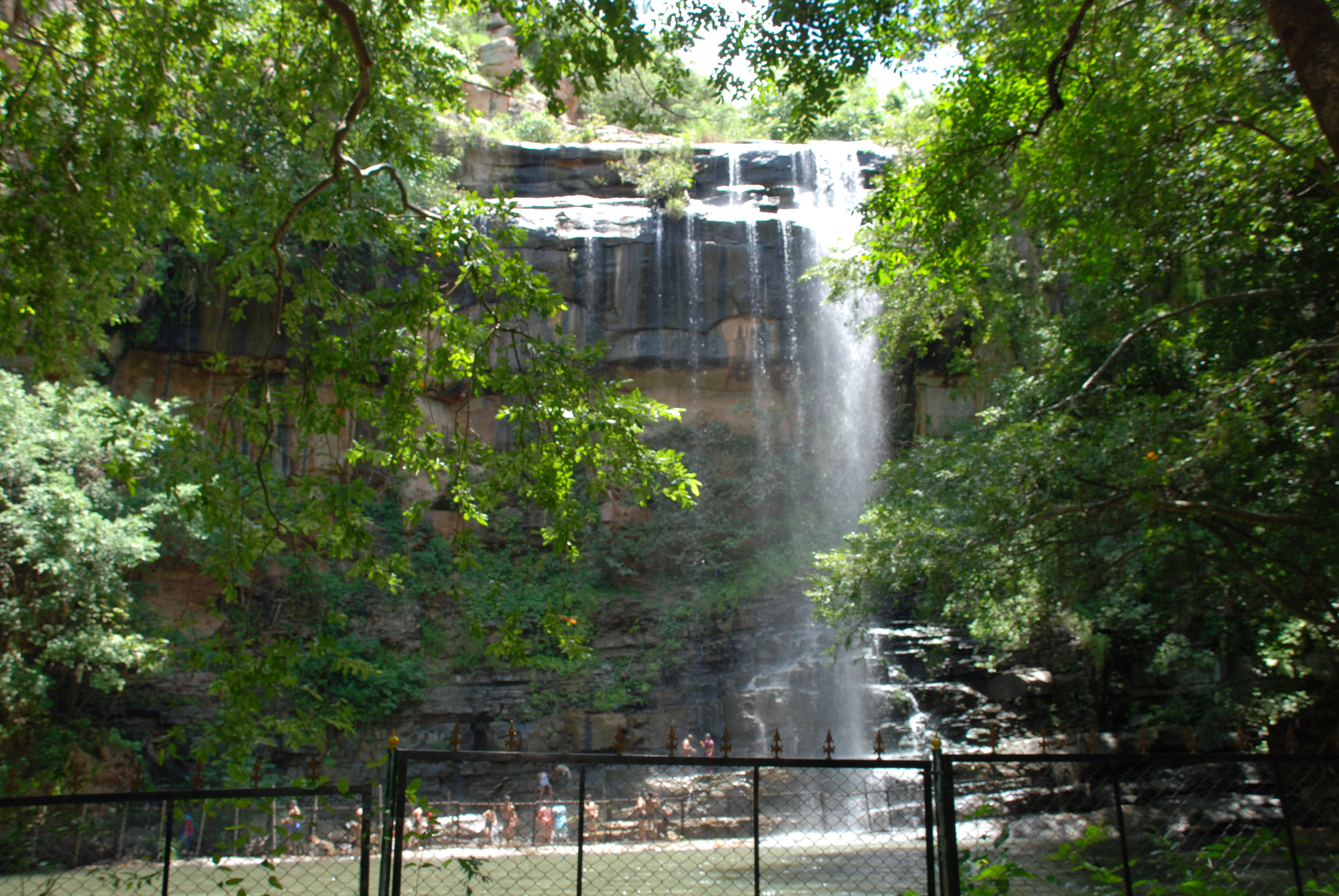
Mallelatheertham Waterfalls, Srisailam

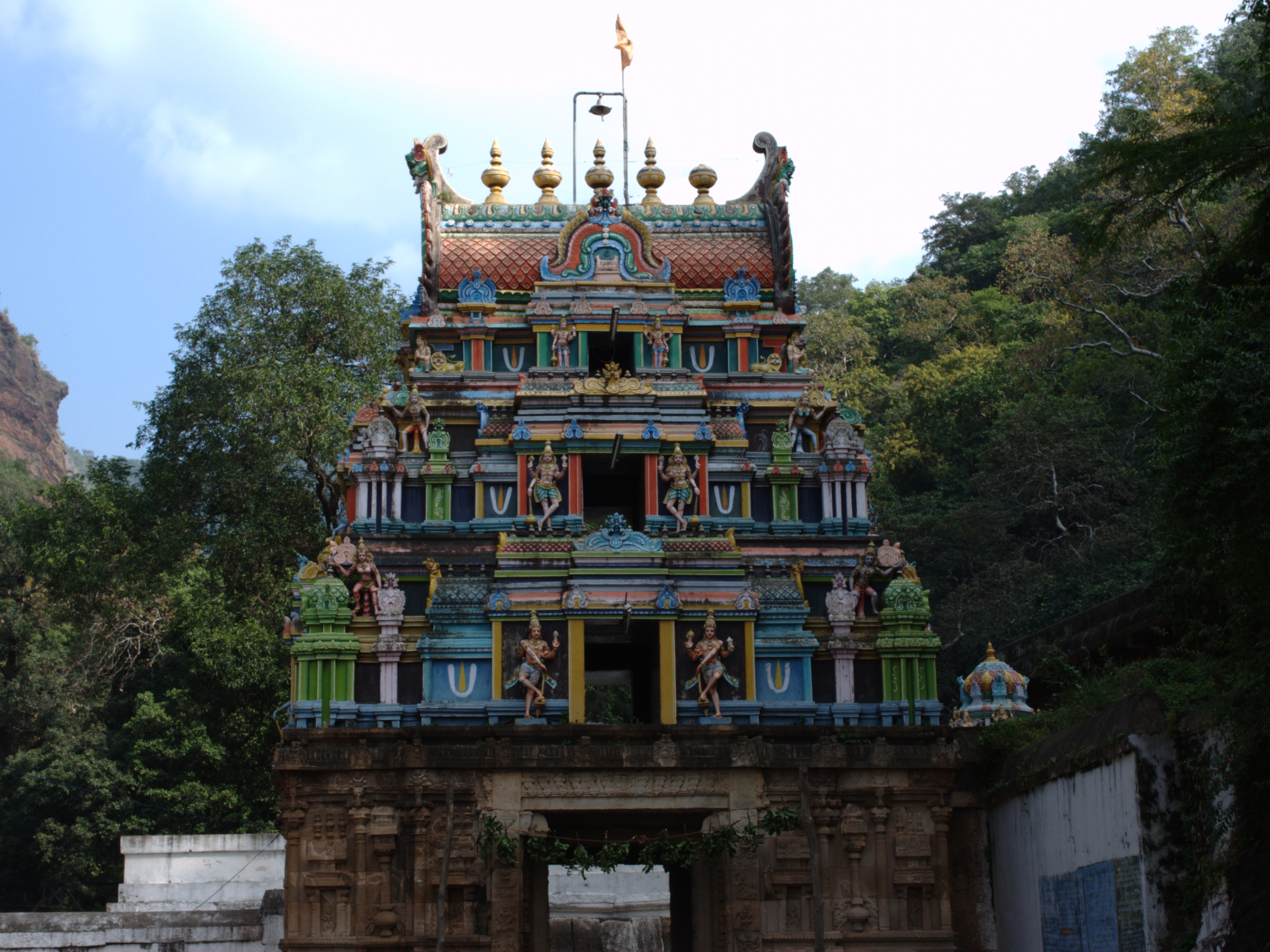
Upper Ahobilam temple Gopuram

== Notable incidents ==
On 2 September 2009, a Bell-430 chopper carrying the Andhra Pradesh Chief Minister Y.S. Rajasekhara Reddy, with two pilots, a chief security officer and secretary went missing in the Nallamala forest. After nearly twenty four hours of search by police, para military, Indian Army, Indian Air Force, India Space Research Organization personnel among others, the chopper was located in a mangled and charred state on the top of the 800 ft. Pavuralla Konda (Doves' hill). All five died in the crash owing to inclement weather conditions.

== See also ==
- Gundlakamma River
- Nallamala Forest
