= Atchampet mandal, Palnadu district =

Atchampet mandal
- Mandal
- Atchampet H/O Chamarru
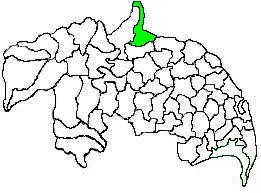
- Mandal map of Guntur district showing Atchampet mandal (in green)
- Interactive map of Atchampet mandal
- Location in Andhra Pradesh, India
- Country: India
- State: Andhra Pradesh
- District: Palnadu
- Headquarters: Chamarru

Government
  - Body: Mandal Parishad
  - Tehsildar: K.Nagesh

Area
  - Total: 191.17 km^{2} (73.81 sq mi)

Population (2011)
  - Total: 58,447
  - Density: 305.73/km^{2} (791.85/sq mi)

Languages
  - Official: Telugu
- Time zone: UTC+5:30 (IST)

Atchampet mandal (officially Atchampet H/O Chamarru) is one of the 28 mandals in Palnadu district of the Indian state of Andhra Pradesh. The mandal is under the administration of Sattenapalli revenue division and the headquarters are located at Atchampet, Palnadu district. The mandal is located on the banks of Krishna River, at a distance 68 km from the district headquarters. It is bounded by Amaravathi, Krosuru, Pedakurapadu, Bellamkonda and Sattenapalli mandals.

== Demographics ==
As of 2011 census, the mandal had a population of 58,447. The total population constitute, 29,749 males and 28,698 females —a sex ratio of 965 females per 1000 males. 6,676 children are in the age group of 0–6 years.

== Government and politics ==
The mandal is under the control of a tahsildar and the present tahsildar is G.Sujatha. Atchampet mandal is one of the 5 mandals under Pedakurapadu (Assembly constituency), which in turn represents Narasaraopet (Lok Sabha constituency) of Andhra Pradesh.

=== Jurisdiction ===
As of 2011 census, the mandal has 18 villages.

The settlements in the mandal are listed below:

1. Ambadipudi
2. Challagariga
3. Chamarru
4. Chigurupadu
5. Chintapalle
6. Ginjupalle
7. Kastala Agraharam
8. Kogantivaripalem
9. Konduru
10. Konuru
11. Madipadu Agraharam
12. Madipadu Seri
13. Mittapalem
14. Orvakallu
15. Pedapalem
16. Taduvoy
17. Thallacheruvu
18. Velpuru

== See also ==
- List of mandals in Andhra Pradesh
- Villages in Atchampet mandal
