= Gudipudi railway station =

Railway station in Andhra Pradesh, India

Gudipudi

General information
- Location: Gudipudi, Palnadu district, Andhra Pradesh; India
- Coordinates: 16.24180°N 80.09101°E
- Operator: Indian Railways
- Platforms: 2

Construction
- Structure type: On ground
- Accessible: Disabled access

Other information
- Station code: GPDE
- Zone(s): South Central Railway
- Division(s): Guntur

Services
Preceding station	Indian Railways	Following station
Pedakurapadu towards ?	South Central Railway zone Nallapadu-Pagidipalli section	Sattenapalle towards ?
Location
- Location within Andhra Pradesh Location within India

Gudipudi railway station (station code: GPDE), is an Indian Railways station in Gudipudi village of Palnadu district in Andhra Pradesh. It lies on the Nallapadu–Pagidipalli section and is administered under Guntur railway division of South Central Railway zone. It halts 6 trains every day.

== Structure and amenities ==
The station has roof top solar panels installed by the Indian railways, along with various railway stations and service buildings in the country, as a part of sourcing 500 MW solar energy.

== See also ==
- List of railway stations in India
