= Pedakurapadu railway station =

Railway station in Andhra Pradesh, India

Pedakurapadu

General information
- Location: Pedakurapadu, Palnadu district, Andhra Pradesh; India
- Coordinates: 16.24180°N 80.09101°E
- Operator: Indian Railways
- Line: Nallapadu–Pagidipalli section
- Platforms: 2

Construction
- Structure type: On ground
- Accessible: Disabled access

Other information
- Station code: PKPU
- Zone(s): South Central Railway
- Division(s): Guntur

Services
Preceding station	Indian Railways	Following station
Lingamguntla towards ?	South Central Railway zone Nallapadu-Pagidipalli section	Gudipudi towards ?
Location
- Location within Andhra Pradesh Location within India

Peadkurapadu railway station (station code: PKPU), is an Indian Railways station in Pedakurapadu of Palnadu district in Andhra Pradesh. It lies on the Nallapadu–Pagidipalli section and is administered under Guntur railway division of South Central Railway zone. It is one of the railway stations to be a part of planned Amaravati–Sattenapalle–Narasaropet section for linking the state capital.

== Structure and amenities ==
The station has roof top solar panels installed by the Indian railways, along with various railway stations and service buildings in the country, as a part of sourcing 500 MW solar energy.

== See also ==
- List of railway stations in India
