= Kammavaripalem =

Kammavaripalem is the name of a number of populated places in the Indian State of Andhra Pradesh.

These may include:

- Kammavaripalem, Guntur district
- Kammavaripalem, Krishna district
- Kammavaari palem, Nellore district
- Kammavaripalem, Prakasam district
