= Kanneganti Hanumanthu =

Indian freedom fighter (1870–1922)

- కన్నెగంటి హనుమంతు
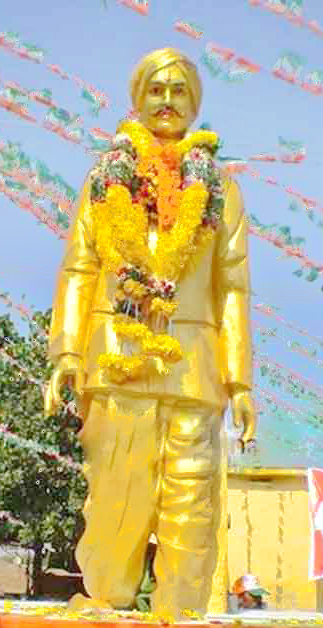
- Born: 1870; Minchalapadu, Krishna district, Madras Presidency (present-day Palnadu district, Andhra Pradesh)
- Died: 22 February 1922 (aged c. 51); Minchalapadu, Guntur district, Madras Presidency (present-day Palnadu district, Andhra Pradesh)
- Cause of death: Execution by firing squad
- Occupation: Freedom fighter
- Movement: Indian independence movement

Kanneganti Hanumanthu (also spelled as Kaneganti Hanumanthu; 1870–1922) was an Indian freedom fighter and farmer leader who rebelled against British rule and spearheaded the Palnadu Rebellion.

The British imposed a tax called 'Pullari' on farmers for using the forest produce and grazing their cattle in the forest. As a part of the non-cooperation movement, Pullari Satyagraha was organized in the Palnadu region and Hanumanthu mobilised people to not pay the tax. Under his leadership, people organised a social boycott of Revenue and Forest department officials. All goods and services were denied to the officials including food, laundry, barbering.

Hanumanthu was arrested multiple times by the police. British colonial administrator T. G. Rutherford tried bribing Hanumanthu. Rutherford offered to make Hanumanthu a zamindar for 45 villages in the Durgi region, but he refused. The village Karanam betrayed Hanumanthu. On 22 February 1922, the police besieged the village and shot him 24 to 26 times and even prevented the villagers from offering him water. Hanumanthu shouted the Vande Mataram slogan for nearly six hours and died.

== Life ==
Kanneganti Hanumanthu was born in a Kapu family in 1870 in Minchalapadu village (Kolagatla), in Durgi Mandal of Palnadu district of present-day Andhra Pradesh. He was the second son of Achamma, and Venkatappayya. Growing up, he was enraged by the conditions and humiliation suffered by Indians under British rule.

Pullari was a tax imposed by the British on farmers of the forest villages for using the forest produce. Tax was imposed on gathering wood and even for grazing cattle in the forests. As a part of the non-cooperation movement, Pullari Satyagraha was organized in the Palnadu region. Hanumanthu mobilised the people to not pay the tax. Hanumanthu was supported by local leaders such as Konda Venkatappayya during the no-tax movement. Under the leadership of Hanumanthu, people organised a social boycott of Revenue and Forest department officials. People denied all goods and services to the officials including food, laundry, barbering.

Hanumanthu was arrested multiple times by the British. Under the leadership of Hanumanthu, the Chenchus of Nallamalla Hills fought against the British as a part of Palnadu forest satyagraha in 1921-22. The people came out in full support of Hanumanthu. All the strategies planned by the British against the people, were defended by him. The support of these masses was too strong to cause any impact. So, British colonial administrator T. G. Rutherford tried bribing Hanumanthu. Rutherford offered to make Hanumanthu a zamindar for 45 villages in the Durgi region, but he refused.

The following rebellion cry is attributed to Hanumanthu:

Neeru pettava, Naatu vesava? Kotha kosava, Kuppa nurchava? Endhuku kattali ra sisthu? (transl. Have you ever irrigated any land, or planted a seedling? Ever harvested or trashed any field? Why would I pay you any tax for what is mine?)

== Death ==
On 22 February 1922, some British officials came to Minchalapadu village, and warned Hanumanthu of severe consequences if the Pullari tax was not paid. As Gandhi had called-off the non-cooperation movement already, Hanumanthu agreed to pay the tax. He planned to continue the struggle later in other ways. On the day of Maha Sivaratri at Kotappakonda, Hanumanthu and his followers left to take part in the procession, leaving only women and children. Taking advantage of his absence, district collector Warner gave some police troops to Inspector Raghavayya. The police surrounded the village and began to take away the cattle, forcibly beating up the elder and women with their rifle butts when they tried to protest.

Hanumanthu rushed to his village and pleaded with the British to stop harassing the residents. The village karanam betrayed Hanumanthu. The British treated him with cruelty by shooting him 24 to 26 times and preventing the villagers from even offering him water. He shouted the Vandemataram slogan for nearly six hours and died. After four days, Hanumanthu’s last rites were performed by his wife and relatives at Minchalapadu.

== In popular culture ==
- Gurram Jashuva penned a poem about the valour of Hanumanthu.
- Hanumanthu was referred to in a song from the 1974 biographical action film Alluri Seetarama Raju.
