= Macherla railway station =

Railway station in Andhra Pradesh, India

General information
- Location: PWD Colony, Macherla, Palnadu district, Andhra Pradesh; India
- Coordinates: 16.48°N 79.43°E
- Owner: Indian Railways
- Operator: Indian Railways
- Line: Nadikudi–Macherla branch line
- Platforms: 1
- Tracks: 1
- Train operators: Indian Railways

Construction
- Structure type: Terminus
- Parking: Available
- Accessible: Disabled access

Other information
- Status: Active
- Station code: MCLA
- Zone(s): South Central Railway
- Division(s): Guntur Railway DivisionGuntur
- Website: irctc.com

Services
Preceding station	Indian Railways	Following station
Paluvayi Halt towards ?	Nadikudi–Macherla branch line	Terminus
Location
- Location within Andhra Pradesh Location within India

Macherla railway station (station code: MCLA), is an Indian Railways station in Macherla of Andhra Pradesh. It lies on the Nadikudi–Macherla branch line and is administered under Guntur railway division of South Central Railway zone.

== See also ==
- List of railway stations in India
