= Andugulapadu =

- Village
- Interactive map of Andugulapadu
- Location within Andhra Pradesh Location within India
- Coordinates: 16°01′56″N 79°36′05″E
- Country: India
- State: Andhra Pradesh
- District: Palnadu

Area
  - Total: 17.49 km^{2} (6.75 sq mi)

Population (2011)
  - Total: 2,878
  - Density: 164.6/km^{2} (426.2/sq mi)

Languages
  - Official: Telugu
- Time zone: UTC+5:30 (IST)
- PIN: 522647

Andugulapadu is a village in Palnadu district of the Indian state of Andhra Pradesh. It is located in Vinukonda mandal of Narasaraopet revenue division.

== Demographics ==
As of 2011 India census, Andugulapadu had a population of 2878 comprising 49.8% male population and females 50.1%. Andugulapadu has an average literacy rate of 45.65%, lower than the national average of 74%: male literacy is 62.86%, and female literacy is 37.13%. In Andugulapadu, 11% of the population is under 6 years of age.
