= Guntupalem =

- village
- Interactive map of Guntupalem
- Location in Andhra Pradesh, India Guntupalem (India)
- Coordinates: 16°2′43″N 79°52′4″E
- Country: India
- State: Andhra Pradesh
- District: Palnadu

Government
  - Type: people elected
  - Body: Lok Sabha

Population
  - Total: 2,500

Languages
  - Official: Telugu
- Time zone: UTC+5:30 (IST)
- PIN: 522646
- Vehicle registration: AP
- Nearest city: Vinukonda, Narasaraopeta
- Literacy: 65%
- Lok Sabha constituency: Narasaraopet
- Vidhan Sabha constituency: Vinukonda

Guntupalem is a village in Palnadu district in the state of Andhra Pradesh, India.
