= Bandlamotu =

- Village
- Interactive map of Bandlamotu
- Location in Andhra Pradesh, India
- Coordinates: 16°12′52″N 79°39′27″E
- Country: India
- State: Andhra Pradesh
- District: Palnadu

Government
  - Type: State Government
  - Body: Panchayati raj

Area
  - Total: 96 km^{2} (37 sq mi)
- Elevation: 95 m (312 ft)

Population (2011)
  - Total: 3,653
  - Density: 38/km^{2} (99/sq mi)

Languages
- Time zone: UTC+5:30 (IST)
- PIN: 522663
- Telephone code: 0863
- Vehicle registration: TG

Bandlamotu is a village in Bollapalle mandal, located in Palnadu district of Indian state of Andhra Pradesh.
