= Konanki =

- Village
- Interactive map of Konanki
- Location in Andhra Pradesh, India
- Coordinates: 16.6°N 79.7333°E
- Country: India
- State: Andhra Pradesh
- District: Palnadu
- Mandal: Piduguralla

Government
  - Type: Panchayati raj
  - Body: Konanki gram panchayat

Area
  - Total: 1,619 ha (4,000 acres)

Population (2011)
  - Total: 5,894
  - Density: 364.1/km^{2} (942.9/sq mi)

Languages
  - Official: Telugu
- Time zone: UTC+5:30 (IST)
- PIN: 522xxx
- Area code: +91–8649
- Vehicle registration: AP

Konanki is a village in Piduguralla mandal,Palnadu district of the Indian state of Andhra Pradesh.
