= Nallapadu railway station =

Railway station in Nallapadu, India

Nallapadu
- Nallapadu railway station

General information
- Location: Nallapadu, Guntur district, Andhra Pradesh; India
- Coordinates: 16.3082°N 80.3978°E
- Owner: Government of India
- Operator: Indian Railways
- Lines: Nallapadu–Nandyal section, Pagidipalli–Nallapadu section
- Platforms: 3
- Tracks: 4

Construction
- Structure type: On ground
- Accessible: Disabled access

Other information
- Status: Active
- Station code: NLPD
- Zone(s): South Central Railway
- Division(s): Guntur

Services
Preceding station	Indian Railways	Following station
Bandarupalle towards ?	Pagidipalli–Nallapadu section	Guntur Junction towards ?
Perecherla towards ?	Vijayawada–Hubballi line Nallapadu–Nandyal section	Guntur Junction towards ?
Location
- Location within Andhra Pradesh Location within India

Nallapadu railway station (station code: NLPD), is an Indian Railways station in Guntur of Andhra Pradesh. It is located at Nallapadu, a suburb of the city on the Nallapadu–Nandyal section. It is administered under Guntur railway division of South Central Railway zone.
