= Abbarajupalem, Pedakurapadu mandal =

Abbarajupalem
- Village
- Interactive map of Abbarajupalem
- Location in Andhra Pradesh, India Abbarajupalem (India)
- Coordinates: 16.4833°N 80.2667°E
- Country: India
- State: Andhra Pradesh
- District: Palnadu
- Mandal: Pedakurapadu

Government
  - Type: Panchayati raj
  - Body: Abbarajupalem Gram Panchayat
  - Sarpanch: Jannavarapu sitareddy

Area
  - Total: 5.86 km^{2} (2.26 sq mi)
- Elevation: 52 m (171 ft)

Population (2011)
  - Total: 770
  - Density: 130/km^{2} (340/sq mi)

Languages
  - Official: Telugu
- Time zone: UTC+5:30 (IST)
- PIN: 522 436
- Telephone code: +91–8640
- Vehicle registration: AP

Abbarajupalem is a village in Pedakurapadu mandal, Palnadu district of the Indian state of Andhra Pradesh. It is located in middle of Amaravathi to Sattenapalle main road.

== Government and politics ==
Abbarajupalem gram panchayat in Pedakurapadu mandal is the local self-government of the village. It is divided into wards and each ward is represented by a ward member. The ward members are headed by a Sarpanch. The village forms a part of Andhra Pradesh Capital Region and is under the jurisdiction of APCRDA.

== Education ==
As per the school information report for the academic year 2018–19, the village has only one primary school and one preschool (Anganvadi).
