= Narasaraopet =

Narasaraopeta
- District Headquarter; Municipal Town
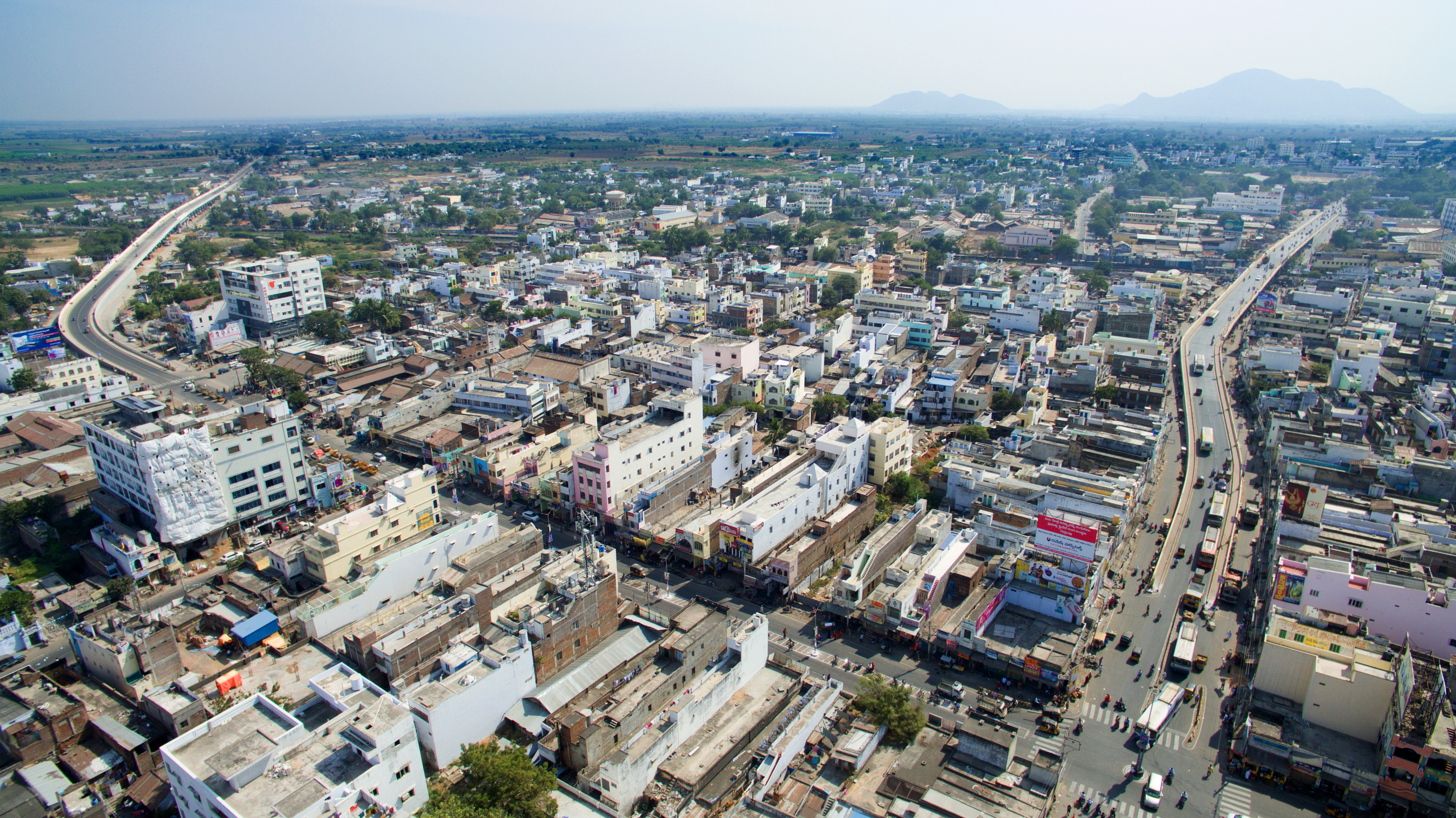

- Location in Andhra Pradesh, India Narasaraopeta (India) Narasaraopeta (Asia) Narasaraopeta (Earth)
- Coordinates: 16.235965°N 80.049798°E
- Country: India
- State: Andhra Pradesh
- District: Palnadu

Area
  - Total: 7.65 km^{2} (2.95 sq mi)
- Elevation: 55 m (180 ft)

Population (2011)
  - Total: 116,250
  - Rank: 288th in India and 28th in Andhra Pradesh
  - Density: 15,200/km^{2} (39,400/sq mi)

Languages
  - Official: Telugu
- Time zone: UTC+5:30 (IST)
- PIN: 522601, 522602
- Telephone code: +91–8647
- Vehicle registration: AP-07
- Website: narasaraopet.cdma.ap.gov.in/en

Narasaraopeta is a town and district headquarters of Palnadu District of the Indian state of Andhra Pradesh. The town is a municipality and mandal headquarters of Narasaraopet mandal and Headquarters of Narasaraopet revenue division. The town also is the seat of the court of Additional District Judge. Kotappakonda (Nallamala Forest region) in Narasaraopeta is famous for Kotappakonda Tirunalla and is considered a holy place. The town is also referred as the 'Gateway of Palnadu'. The main offices of Nagarjuna Sagar Jawahar Canal (N.S. Right Canal) Operation & Maintenance Lingamguntla Circle known as NSJC O&M Circle, Lingamguntla are located in this town.

== Etymology ==
The original name of the village was Atluru. The name Narsaraopet comes from Rajah Malraju Narasa Rao, the local Zamindar, who owned much of the surrounding areas.

== Geography and climate ==
Narasaraopeta is the major commercial trading centre in Palanadu district. Narasaraopeta is located on flat land ringed by hills that are an extension of the Eastern Ghats with red rock soil. The summer months can get exceedingly hot up to 45 °C (113 °F), while winters are mild around 21 °C (70 °F). Rainfall is due to the monsoon and is concentrated in the months of July–September. The average annual rainfall is 761 millimetres (30.0 in). The southwest monsoon season contributes 400 mm (16 in), while the northeast monsoon contributes 299 mm (11.8 in). Pre-monsoon thundershowers contribute 75 mm (3.0 in).

== Demographics ==
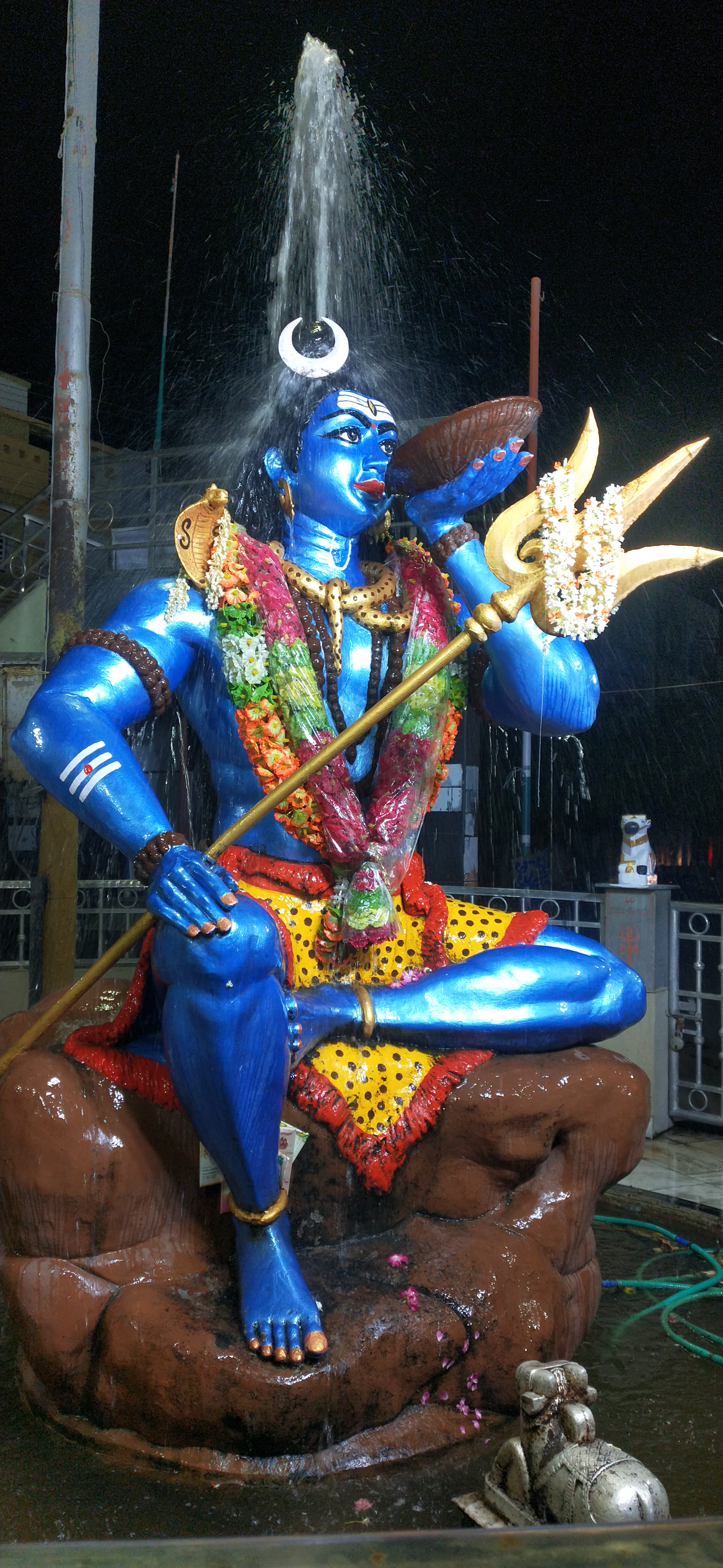
శివుడి బొమ్మ

As of 2011 census, Narasaraopet had a population of 116,329 with 28,186 households. The total population constitute, 58,898 males and 57,431 females —a sex ratio of 975 females per 1,000 males. 10,445 children are in the age group of 0–6 years, of which 5,390 are boys and 5,055 are girls —a ratio of 938 per 1,000. The average literacy rate stands at 79.45% with 84,123 literates, significantly higher than the state average of 67.41%.

The Urban Agglomeration had a population of 118,568, of which males constitute 60,514, females constitute 58,054 —a sex ratio of 975 females per 1,000 males and 10,519 children are in the age group of 0–6 years. There are a total of 84,889 literates with an average literacy rate of 79.30%.

== Economy ==
It serves as a major commercial centre to the surrounding villages and nearby villages of the Prakasam district and Bapatla district. The City is the regional centre for higher education and health services. As a result of proximity to several towns/cities like Chilakaluripet (21 km [13 mi]), Palnadu district (47.9 km [29.8 mi]), Piduguralla (34.4 km [21.4 mi]), Sattenapalle (22.3 km [13.9 mi]), Vinukonda (43.7 km [27.2 mi]), on an average around 50,000 floating population is observed on a daily basis.

== Governance ==
=== Civic administration ===
Narasaraopet Municipality is a civic body of Narasaraopet, constituted on 18 June 1915. It got upgraded to Grade–I municipality on 28 April 1980 and it got upgraded to Selection Grade Municipality and has a jurisdictional area of 7.65 km^{2} (2.95 sq mi).

=== Politics ===
Narasaraopet is a part of Narasaraopet assembly constituency of Andhra Pradesh Legislative Assembly Dr. Chadalavada Aravinda Babu is the current MLA of this constituency from the TDP Party. It is also a part of Narasaraopet Lok Sabha constituency Vacant of this Member of Parliament (India).

== Transport ==
The Guntur to Kurnool / Ananthapuram / Ballari NH 544D bypasses the city and the NH167A road (Piduguralla to Chirala) passes through the city. The town has a total road length of 157.08 km (97.60 mi). APSRTC operates buses from Narasaraopet bus station.

Narasaraopet railway station is located on the Nallapadu–Nandyal section and administered under Guntur railway division of South Coastal Railway zone.

== Tourism ==
Kotappakonda hill is a major religious destination dedicated to Lord Shiva. On the auspicious day of Mahasivarathri, a grand fair is conducted nearby the hill. During which people around the surrounding regions visit the shiva temple on the Kottappakonda hill.

Bheema Lingeswara Swamy Temple and Pathuru Shivalayam (renovated) located in the city also receive limited tourism. Sri Veera Brahmamendra Swamy Temple, located at Lingamguntla Agraharam is two kilometres (1.2 mi) away from main city.

== Notable people ==
The city is known for Politics, Drama, Poetry. Some notable include

- Bharathi Tirtha (36th Shankaracharya of Sringeri Sharada Peetham)
- Dr.Kodela Siva Prasada Rao (Speaker of Andhra Pradesh Legislative Assembly)
- Kasu Brahmananda Reddy (Chief Minister of A.P)
- Vijay Nirmala (Indian Actor and Producer)
- Sivaji (Telugu Film Actor)
- Ramajogayya Sastry (Telugu Film Lyricist)
- Ramya Behara (Indian Playback Singer)

== Education ==
The primary and secondary school education is imparted by government, aided and private schools, under the School Education Department of the state.

== See also ==
- List of cities in India by population
- List of cities in Andhra Pradesh by population
- List of municipalities in Andhra Pradesh
