= Karlakunta =

- Village
- Interactive map of Karlakunta
- Location in Andhra Pradesh, India
- Country: India
- State: Andhra Pradesh
- Region: Palnadu
- District: Palnadu district
- Mandal: Rompicherla

Languages
  - Official: Telugu
- Time zone: UTC+5:30 (IST)
- PIN: 522 615
- Telephone code: 08647
- Vehicle registration: AP–07

Karlakunta is a village in Rompicherla mandal, located in Palnadu district of the Indian state of Andhra Pradesh.

== Geography ==
Karlakunta is located near the main route from Hyderabad-Addanki highway near Santhagudipadu, which is about 2 km away from the main highway, 55 kilometres (34 mi) from Palnadu district, the administrative capital of its district, and 255 kilometres (158 mi) from Hyderabad, the capital city of its state. Karlkunta is surrounded by villages like Santhagudipadu, Rompicherla, Ramireddy palem, Buchibapannapalem and Muppala.
