= Kuchinapally =

- Village
- Interactive map of Kuchinapally
- Location in Andhra Pradesh, India Kuchinapally (India)
- Coordinates: 16.463892°N 80.617428°E
- Country: India
- State: Andhra Pradesh
- District: Palnadu

Languages
  - Official: Telugu
- Time zone: UTC+5:30 (IST)

Kuchinapally is a hamlet under Ipur village, Ipur mandal, Palnadu district, Andhra Pradesh, India.
