= Kothaganesunipadu =

kotha ganesunipadu
- Village
- Country: India
- State: Andhra Pradesh
- District: Palnadu
- Mandal: machavaram mandal

Government
  - Type: Panchayati raj
  - Body: Thummalacheruvu gram panchayat

Area
  - Total: 2,578 ha (6,370 acres)

Population (2011)
  - Total: 8,889
  - Density: 344.8/km^{2} (893.0/sq mi)

Languages
  - Official: Telugu
- Time zone: UTC+5:30 (IST)
- PIN: 522413
- Area code: +91–8643
- Vehicle registration: AP

Kotha ganesunipadu is a village in Palnadu district of the Indian state of Andhra Pradesh. It is located in machavaram mandal of Guntur revenue division.
