= Jangamaheswarapadu =

Coordinates: 16.53990°N 79.64039°E

Jangamaheswarapadu is a village in Gurajala mandal of Palnadu district of Andhra Pradesh in South India. It is 2 km south of Gurajala.
