= Atchampet, Palnadu district =

Village in Palnadu district, Andhra Pradesh, India

Coordinates: 16°37′46″N 80°07′12″E

Atchampet is a village and headquarters of Atchampet mandal, Palnadu district, Andhra Pradesh, India.
