= Abbarajupalem =

Abbarajupalem may refer to:

- Abbarajupalem, Pedakurapadu mandal, a village in Pedakurapadu mandal, Guntur district, Andhra Pradesh, India
- Abbarajupalem, Amaravati (state capital), a neighbourhood of Amaravati (state capital), Guntur district, Andhra Pradesh, India
