= Ellamanda =

- Village
- Interactive map of Ellamanda
- Location in Andhra Pradesh, India
- Coordinates: 16°11′02″N 80°03′14″E
- Country: India
- State: Andhra Pradesh
- District: Palnadu
- Mandal: Narasaraopet

Government
  - Type: Panchayati raj
  - Body: Ellamanda gram panchayat

Area
  - Total: 4,480 ha (11,100 acres)

Population (2011)
  - Total: 17,336
  - Density: 387/km^{2} (1,000/sq mi)

Languages
  - Official: Telugu
- Time zone: UTC+5:30 (IST)
- PIN: 522xxx
- Area code: +91–
- Vehicle registration: AP

Ellamanda is a village in Palnadu district of the Indian state of Andhra Pradesh. It is located in Narasaraopet mandal of Narasaraopet revenue division.

== Governance ==
Ellamanda gram panchayat is the local self-government of the village. It is divided into wards and each ward is represented by a ward member.

== Education ==
As per the school information report for the academic year 2018–19, the village has a total of 16 schools. These include 14 Zilla Parishad/MPP and 2 private schools.
