= Ravipadu, Narasaraopet mandal =

Ravipadu
- Village (now merged in Narasaraopet MD)
- Interactive map of Ravipadu
- Location in Andhra Pradesh, India
- Coordinates: 16.25°N 80.01°E
- Country: India
- State: Andhra Pradesh
- District: Palnadu
- Mandal: Narasaraopet

Government
  - Type: Panchayati Raj
  - Body: Ravipadu Gram panchayati

Area
  - Total: 2,149 ha (5,310 acres)

Population (2011)
  - Total: 8,047
  - Density: 374.5/km^{2} (969.8/sq mi)

Languages
  - Official: Telugu
- Time zone: UTC+5:30 (IST)
- PIN: 522603
- Area code: +91–
- Vehicle registration: AP

Ravipadu is a Village in Palnadu district of the Indian State of Andhra Pradesh. It is located in Narasaraopet mandal of Narasaraopet revenue division.

Ravipadu Gram Panchayati is the local self-government of the village. It is divided into wards and each ward is represented by a ward member.

== Education ==
As per the school information report for the academic year 2018-19, the village has a total of ten schools. These include one Andhra Pradesh Tribal Welfare Residential, six private and four Mandal Parishad Primary schools.

== History ==
Ravipadu (Telugu: రావిపాడు) is a major panchayat 4 km West of Narasaraopet along the Hyderabad highway. There are over 12,000 people with various socio-religious backgrounds. The majority of the people depend on cultivation as the main source of income. Christianity and Hinduism are two major religions prevalent in the village.

The village is divided into many colonies as the Main Village, Karcheri, Kotturu, Jaripet, Jamminagar, and separate colonies for Backward castes along the Narasaraopet highway. Over 4,000 acres (16 km2) of land is under irrigation, which includes wet and dry land. Paddy, chillies, cotton and other commercial crops are produced annually. Tobacco once produced here was well acclaimed all over Andhra and India.

It is believed that a group of the Brahman community started to habituate this place, starting somewhere in the middle of the 17th century. They named this place Ravipadu for a tree called Ravi Chettu, which has been growing there on the bank of the lake for more than 200 years. It got de-routed in 1998 cyclone, killing one and wounding one.

Roman Catholic Church (Immaculate Conception Church) built during the British Colonial time (1890) is considered to be one of the oldest Churches in Andhra Pradesh. There are over ten schools in Ravipadu run by different organizations. Also, the village hosts an Industrial Training Institute (ITI) where different job-oriented vocational training courses are offered. Catholic missionaries play a major role in education; there are three Roman Catholic Schools in the church compound. It is estimated that Christianity entered the village back in the early decades of 18 century through a group of migrating people called "Gandikota Kammas" originating from Rayalaseema (Present Kadapa & Ananthapur districts in Andhra Pradesh) and Eastern Tamil Nadu regions

There are many Hindu temples for Lord Rama, Shiva and other gods. It is said that many people from this village had fought for the Nagarjuna Sagar irrigation project. Over 300 people are living in the US, UK, Italy and other countries for better fortunes and careers. Politically active members can be seen in the TDP, Congress and Communist parties. There have been political differences between the people of the two major political parties which usually trigger at the time of local body elections.

Christianity: per the findings collected over a period of two decades by various sources in private and government archives, the religion spread into the village through a group of converted Christians originating from the South Eastern regions of India, now known to be "Gandikota". It is believed that a large group of other groups (Reddy and Kapu) also converted to the religion during the downfall of the Sri Krishna Devarya dynasty which was invaded by then Muslim Sultanates. Having close associations with Christianity and colonial British rulers, these converted groups were well educated and hence had been considered for high positions in the British Colonial Rule.
