= Mathukumalli =

- village
- Country: India
- State: Andhra Pradesh
- District: Palnadu

Population
  - Total: 4,000

Languages
  - Official: Telugu
- Time zone: UTC+5:30 (IST)
- PIN: 522646
- Telephone code: 08646
- Lok Sabha constituency: Narasaraopet
- Vidhan Sabha constituency: Vinukonda

Mathukumalli is a village in Savalyapuram mandal of Palnadu district in Andhra Pradesh, India.
