= Narasaraopet railway station =

Railway station in Andhra Pradesh

Narasaraopet

General information
- Location: Railway station road, Narasaraopet, Andhra Pradesh; India
- Coordinates: 16.2297°N 80.0399°E
- Operator: Indian Railways
- Line: Nallapadu–Nandyal section
- Platforms: 3
- Tracks: Electric Double line

Construction
- Structure type: On ground
- Parking: Available
- Accessible: Disabled access

Other information
- Status: Active
- Station code: NRT
- Zone(s): South Coast Railway zone
- Division(s): Guntur
- Fare zone: South Coast Railways

Services
Preceding station	Indian Railways	Following station
Satulur towards ?	Nallapadu–Nandyal section	Munumaka towards ?
Location
- Location within Andhra Pradesh Location within India

Narasaraopet railway station (station code:NRT), is an Indian Railways station in Narasaraopet of Andhra Pradesh. It lies on the Nallapadu–Nandyal section. The station is electrified as a part of guntur guntakal Electrification process. It is one of the stations in the division to be equipped with Automatic Ticket Vending Machines (ATVM's). It is administered under Guntur railway division of South Coast Railway zone. It is classified as a D–category station in Guntur railway division.
