= Nadikudi railway station =

Railway Station in DACHEPALLE Municipality in Andhra Pradesh

Nadikude Junction
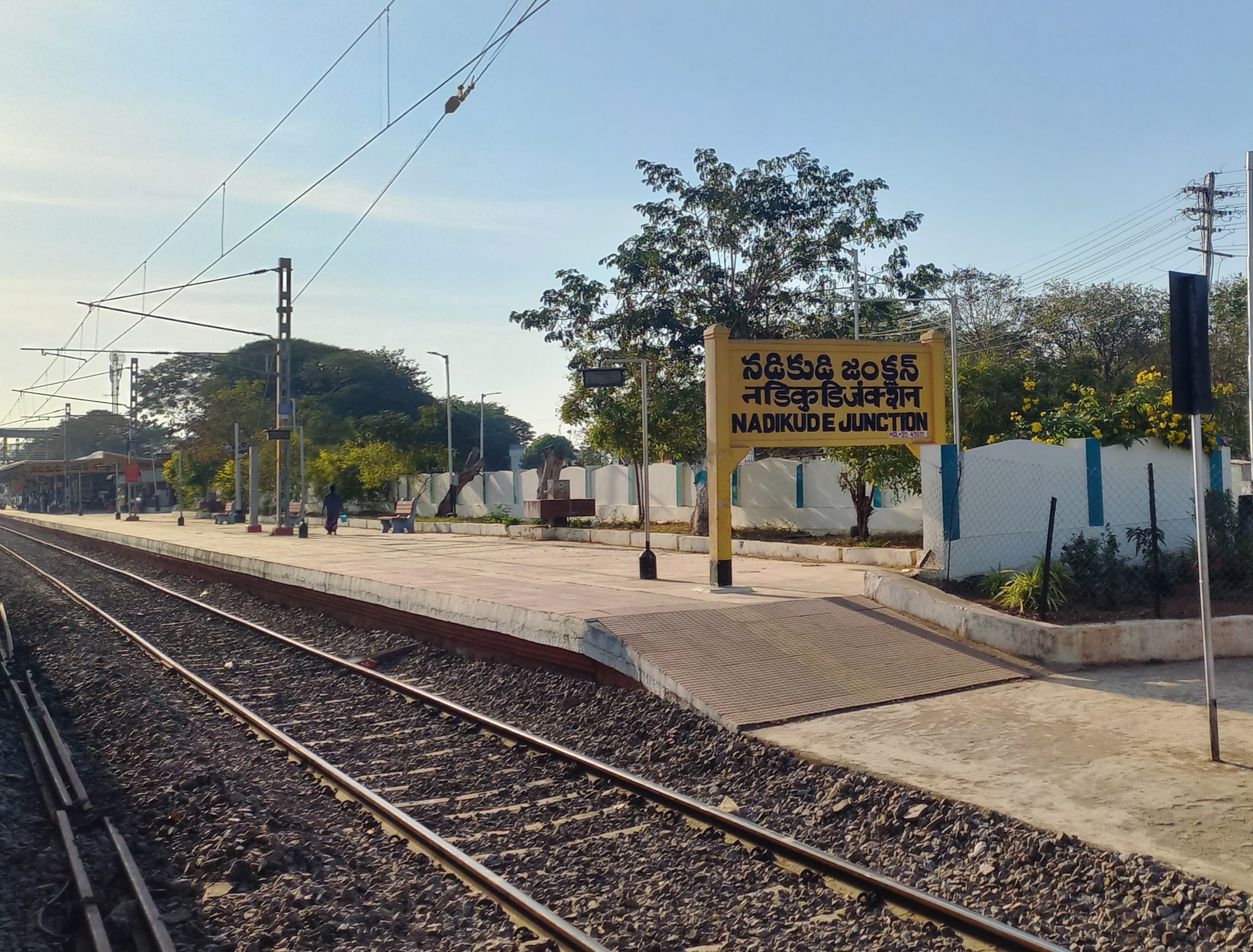
- Nadikudi Junction Railway Station ( Dachepalle )

General information
- Location: Railway Station Road, Nadikudi,Dachepalle-522414, Palnadu district, Andhra Pradesh; India
- Coordinates: 16°21′14″N 79°26′17″E
- Elevation: 98 m (322 ft)
- System: Indian Railways junction station
- Owner: Indian Railways
- Operator: South Coast Railway ( SCoR )
- Lines: Nadikudi-Pagidipalli section Nadikudi-Macherla branch line Nadikudi-Srikalahasti section
- Platforms: 5
- Tracks: 6

Construction
- Structure type: Standard
- Parking: Available
- Accessible: Disabled access

Other information
- Status: Functioning
- Station code: NDKD
- Zone(s): South Coast Railway
- Division(s): Guntur

History
- Opened: 1930; 96 years ago
Location

Nadikudi Railway Station (Station Code: NDKD), is a railway junction in Dachepalle Town, Palnadu District, Andhra Pradesh, India.

== History ==
Historically, Nadikudi was a metre-gauge station. Trains which travelled from Guntur to Macherla used to pass through Nadikudi. Later, Guntur–Macherla section, Tenali–Macherla section was converted from metre gauge to broad gauge and a new line was laid from Bibinagar near Hyderabad to Nadikudi, thus making Nadikudi a junction.

== Route ==
Trains that go to Macherla divert at Nadikudi Junction. The nearest town to Nadikudi is Dachepalle. Nadikudi is located on the Pagidipalli–Nallapadu section of Guntur Division(GNT), in South Central Railway zone (SCR).

== Connectivity ==
Nadikude Junction is well connected with Guntur, Hyderabad, Vijayawada, Vizag and other important destinations like Tirupati, Chennai, Trivandrum Central, Kakinada, Nagarsol, Narsapur, Mumbai, Pune, Bhavnagar Terminus, Ahmedabad. Nadikude Junction have 34 trains passing through it, of which there are 2 Terminating and 2 Originating trains including Kacheguda- Nadikude-Kacheguda Demu.

== Amenities ==
Some of the basic amenities available in Nadikudi railway station are :

• Automatic Ticket Vending Machine (ATVM)

• Reservation booking counter

• Parking facility

• Display Boards

• LED Displays

• Waiting halls (also reserved waiting hall)

• Catering stalls

• Cool drinking water

• Washrooms

• Exclusive washrooms & drinking water facilities for divyaang.

• Sitting benches

• Foot Over Bridge

== Station category ==
Nadikudi railway station is classified as a D–category station. It is one of the four Model stations in the Guntur railway division of South Central Railway zone.

== Freight ==
It handles freight traffic and the main commodities include, cement, rice and paddy.

== See also ==
- List of railway stations in India
