= Nadikudi–Macherla branch line =

Overview
- Status: Operational
- Owner: Indian Railways
- Locale: Andhra Pradesh
- Termini: Nadikudi; Macherla
- Stations: 3

Service
- Services: Pagidipalli–Nallapadu section
- Operator: South Coast Railway

Technical
- Line length: 35.01 km (22 mi)
- Number of tracks: 1
- Track gauge: 5 ft 6 in (1,676 mm) broad gauge
- Electrification: Yes
- Operating speed: 100 km/h

Nadikudi–Macherla branch line connects Nadikudi and Macherla of Palnadu district in the Indian state of Andhra Pradesh. It is one of the seven sections under the administration of Guntur railway division of South Coast Railway zone. Further this line connects with Nallapadu–Pagidipalli section. The branch line is an electrified single-track railway.

== Jurisdiction ==
This branch line is having a length of 35.01 km (21.75 mi) and is administered under Guntur railway division of South Coast Railway zone.
