= Pagidipalli railway station =

Railway station in Telangana, India

Pagidipalli
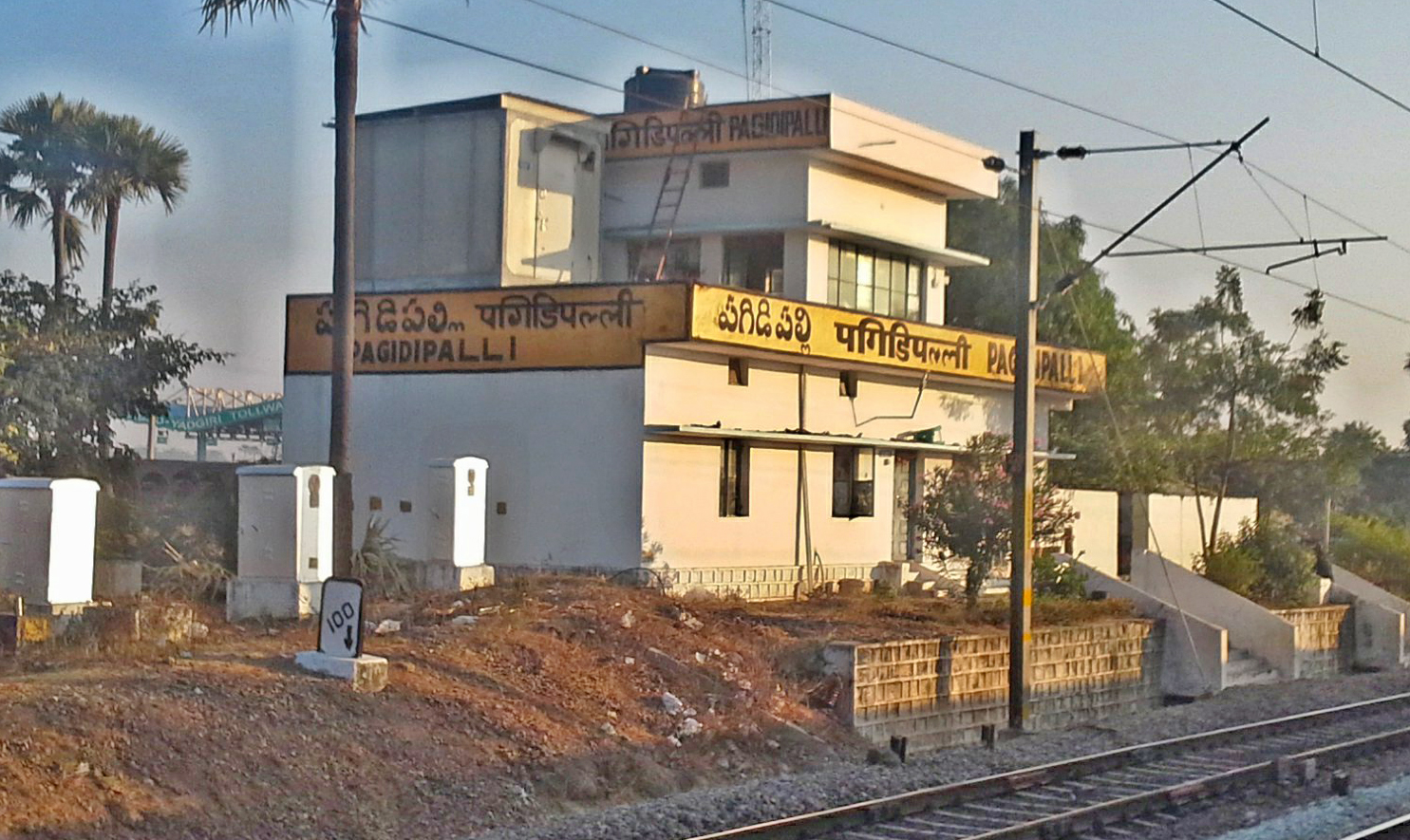

General information
- Location: Warangal Hyderabad highway (NH 163), Telangana; India
- Coordinates: 17°29′04″N 78°49′14″E
- System: Indian Railways station

Construction
- Structure type: Standard (on ground station)

Other information
- Status: Functioning
- Station code: PGDP
- Zone(s): South Central Railway
- Division(s): Secunderabad

Services
Pagidipalli–Nallapadu section
Location
- Location within Telangana Location within India

Pagidipall railway station (station code:PGDP), is a railway junction located near Bibinagar in Bhuvanagiri district where Nadikudi line meets Secunderabad–Kazipet line.
