= Orvakallu =

Village in Andhra Pradesh

Orvakallu is a village in Atchampet Mandal, Guntur District of the Indian state of Andhra Pradesh. It is a part of Andhra Pradesh Capital Region. Orvakallu Village is under Pedakurapadu (Assembly constituency), which in turn represents Narasaraopet (Lok Sabha constituency) of Andhra Pradesh.

Local Language:Telugu

Population:1150 (According to 2014 Voters List)

Male & Female Ratio:1000:998

Famous Festivals: Gangamma Thalli Tirunalla (On Second Pournami Of Every Year), Christmas.
