= Pedapalem =

- Village
- Interactive map of Pedapalem
- Location in Andhra Pradesh, India
- Coordinates: 16.2056°N 80.2813°E
- Country: India
- State: Andhra Pradesh
- District: Palnadu
- Mandal: Atchampet

Government
  - Type: Panchayati raj
  - Body: Pedapalem Gram Panchayat

Area
  - Total: 638 ha (1,580 acres)

Population (2011)
  - Total: 3,916
  - Density: 614/km^{2} (1,590/sq mi)

Languages
  - Official: Telugu
- Time zone: UTC+5:30 (IST)
- PIN: 522410
- Area code: +91–8640
- Vehicle registration: AP

Pedapalem is a village in Palnadu district of the Indian state of Andhra Pradesh. It is the headquarters of Atchampet mandal. The village forms a part of Andhra Pradesh Capital Region and is under the jurisdiction of APCRDA.

== Geography ==
Pedapalem is situated to the southwest of the mandal headquarters, Atchampet, at 16.2056°N 80.2813°E. It is spread over an area of 638 ha (1,580 acres).

== Governance ==
Pedapalem Gram Panchayat is the local self-government of the village. There are wards, each represented by an elected ward member. The sarpanch is elected by the ward members and the office is presently vacant. The village is administered by the Atchampet Mandal Parishad at the intermediate level of panchayat raj institutions.

== Education ==
As per the school information report for the academic year 2018–19, the village has a total of 5 Zilla/Mandal Parishad.
