= Kammavaripalem, Chilakaluripet mandal =

Kammavari Palem is a village in Chilakaluripet mandal, Palnadu district, in the state of Andhra Pradesh, India. The village was originally known as "Kammavari palem."
