= Sattenapalle railway station =

Railway station in Andhra Pradesh, India

Sattenapalle
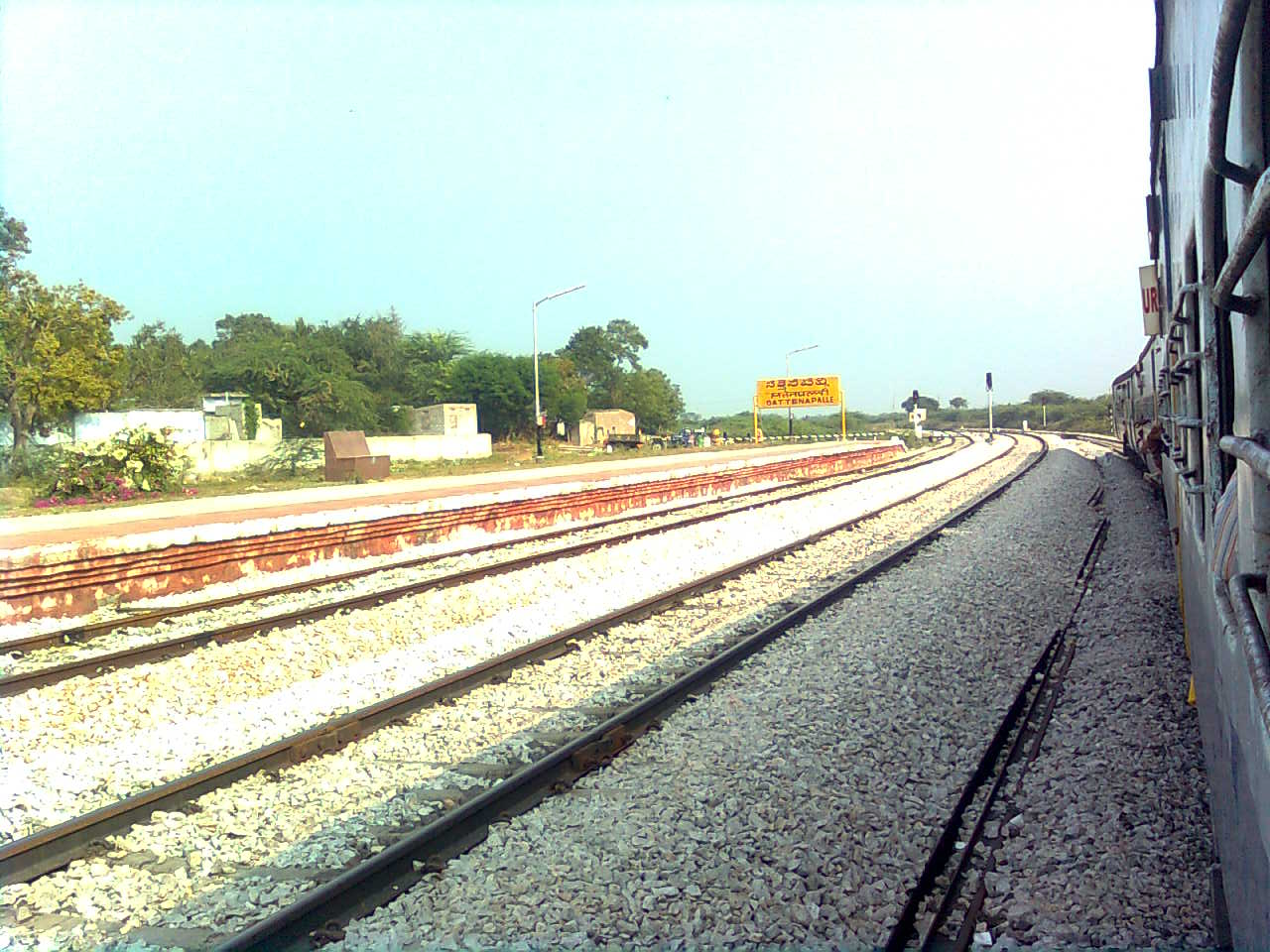
- View of Sattenapalli train station from Janmabhoomi Express

General information
- Location: Sattenapalle, Palnadu district, Andhra Pradesh; India
- Coordinates: 16.24180°N 80.09101°E
- Operator: Indian Railways
- Platforms: 2

Construction
- Structure type: On ground
- Accessible: Disabled access

Other information
- Station code: SAP
- Zone(s): South Central Railway
- Division(s): Guntur

Services
Preceding station	Indian Railways	Following station
Gudipudi towards ?	South Central Railway zone Nallapadu-Pagidipalli section	Reddigudem towards ?
Location
- Location within Andhra Pradesh Location within India

Sattenapalle railway station (station code:SAP) is an Indian Railway station in Sattenapalle of Palnadu district in Andhra Pradesh. It is a D–category station, situated on Nallapadu-Pagidipalli section of Guntur railway division in South Coast Railway zone. It is recognized as one of the Adarsh stations in the division. It forms a new railway line being proposed for the state capital, Amaravati.

== See also ==
- List of railway stations in India
