= Pedakurapadu =

- Village
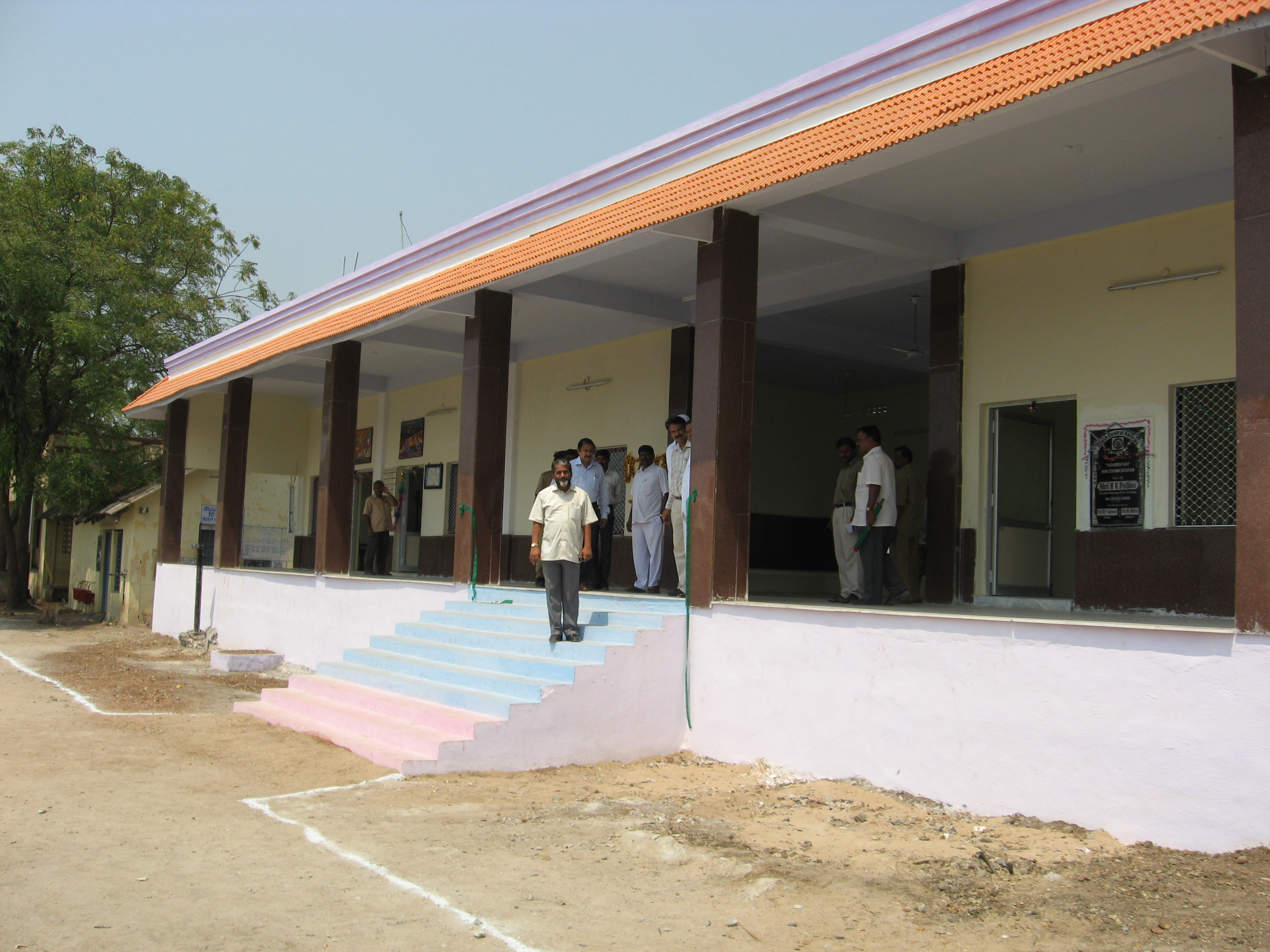
- New railway station of Pedakurapadu, Palnadu
- Interactive map of Pedakurapadu
- Location in Andhra Pradesh, India
- Coordinates: 16.4833°N 80.2667°E
- Country: India
- State: Andhra Pradesh
- District: Palnadu
- Mandal: Pedakurapadu Mandal

Government
  - Type: Panchayati raj
  - Body: Pedakurapadu Gram Panchayat
  - Sarpanch: Gudipudi Raju

Area
  - Total: 1,399 ha (3,460 acres)

Population (2011)
  - Total: 7,062
  - Density: 504.8/km^{2} (1,307/sq mi)

Languages
  - Official: Telugu
- Time zone: UTC+5:30 (IST)
- PIN: 522402
- Area code: +91–8641
- Vehicle registration: AP

Pedakurapadu is a village in Palnadu district of the Indian state of Andhra Pradesh. It is the headquarters of Pedakurapadu mandal in Sattenapalli revenue division.

== Government and politics ==
Pedakurapadu gram panchayat is the local self-government of the village. It is divided into wards and each ward is represented by a ward member. The ward members are headed by a Sarpanch. The village forms a part of Andhra Pradesh Capital Region and is under the jurisdiction of APCRDA.

== Education ==
As per the school information report for the academic year 2018–19, the village has a total of 12 schools. These include 6 Zilla Parishad/Mandal Parishad and 6 private schools.

== Transport ==
Pedakurapadu railway station is situated on Nallapadu–Pagidipalli section. It falls under the administration of Guntur railway division of the South Central Railway zone.
