= Chamarru =

- Village
- Interactive map of Chamarru
- Location in Andhra Pradesh, India
- Coordinates: 16.622633°N 80.173557°E
- Country: India
- State: Andhra Pradesh
- District: Palnadu
- Mandal: Atchampet

Government
  - Type: Panchayati raj
  - Body: Chamarru Gram Panchayat

Area
  - Total: 2,720 ha (6,700 acres)

Population (2011)
  - Total: 12,232
  - Density: 450/km^{2} (1,160/sq mi)

Languages
  - Official: Telugu
- Time zone: UTC+5:30 (IST)
- PIN: 522xxx
- Area code: +91–8649
- Vehicle registration: AP

Chamarru is a village in Palnadu district of the Indian state of Andhra Pradesh. It is the headquarters of Atchampet mandal in Guntur revenue division. The village forms a part of Andhra Pradesh Capital Region and is under the jurisdiction of APCRDA.

== Geography ==
Chamarru is situated at 16.622633°N 80.173557°E. It is spread over an area of 2,720 ha (6,700 acres).

== Governance ==
Chamarru Gram Panchayat is the local self-government of the village. There are wards, each represented by an elected ward member. The ward members elected a sarpanch. The village is administered by the Atchampet Mandal Parishad at the intermediate level of panchayat raj institutions.

== Education ==
As per the school information report for the academic year 2018–19, the village has a total of 11 schools. These schools include 7 Zilla/Mandal Parishad, one KGBV, one State Welfare Residential and two private schools.
