= Gudipudi =

- Village
- Interactive map of Gudipudi
- Location in Andhra Pradesh, India
- Coordinates: 16.52°N 79.74°E
- Country: India
- State: Andhra Pradesh
- District: Palnadu
- Mandal: Sattenapalle

Government
  - Type: Panchayati raj
  - Body: Gudipadu gram panchayat

Area
  - Total: 1,782 ha (4,400 acres)

Population (2011)
  - Total: 5,471
  - Density: 307.0/km^{2} (795.2/sq mi)

Languages
  - Official: Telugu
- Time zone: UTC+5:30 (IST)
- PIN: 522xxx
- Area code: +91–8640
- Vehicle registration: AP

Gudipudi is a village in Palnadu district of the Indian state of Andhra Pradesh. It is located in Sattenapalle mandal of Guntur revenue division.

== Demography ==
Telugu is the local language. The village of Gudipudi covers an area of about 1782 hectares. As of 2011 India census, Gudipudi had a population of 5587, with 2783 men and 2804 women living in 1372 houses.

== Government and politics ==
Gudipudi gram panchayat is the local self-government of the village. The panchayat is divided into wards and each ward is represented by an elected ward member. These ward members are headed by a sarpanch. The present sarpanch of the gram panchayat is Dasari Vijaya Raju, who got elected in the year 2013. The village forms a part of Andhra Pradesh Capital Region and is under the jurisdiction of APCRDA.
