= Ethipothala Falls =

Waterfalls in Andhra Pradesh, India

- యతిపోఁతల
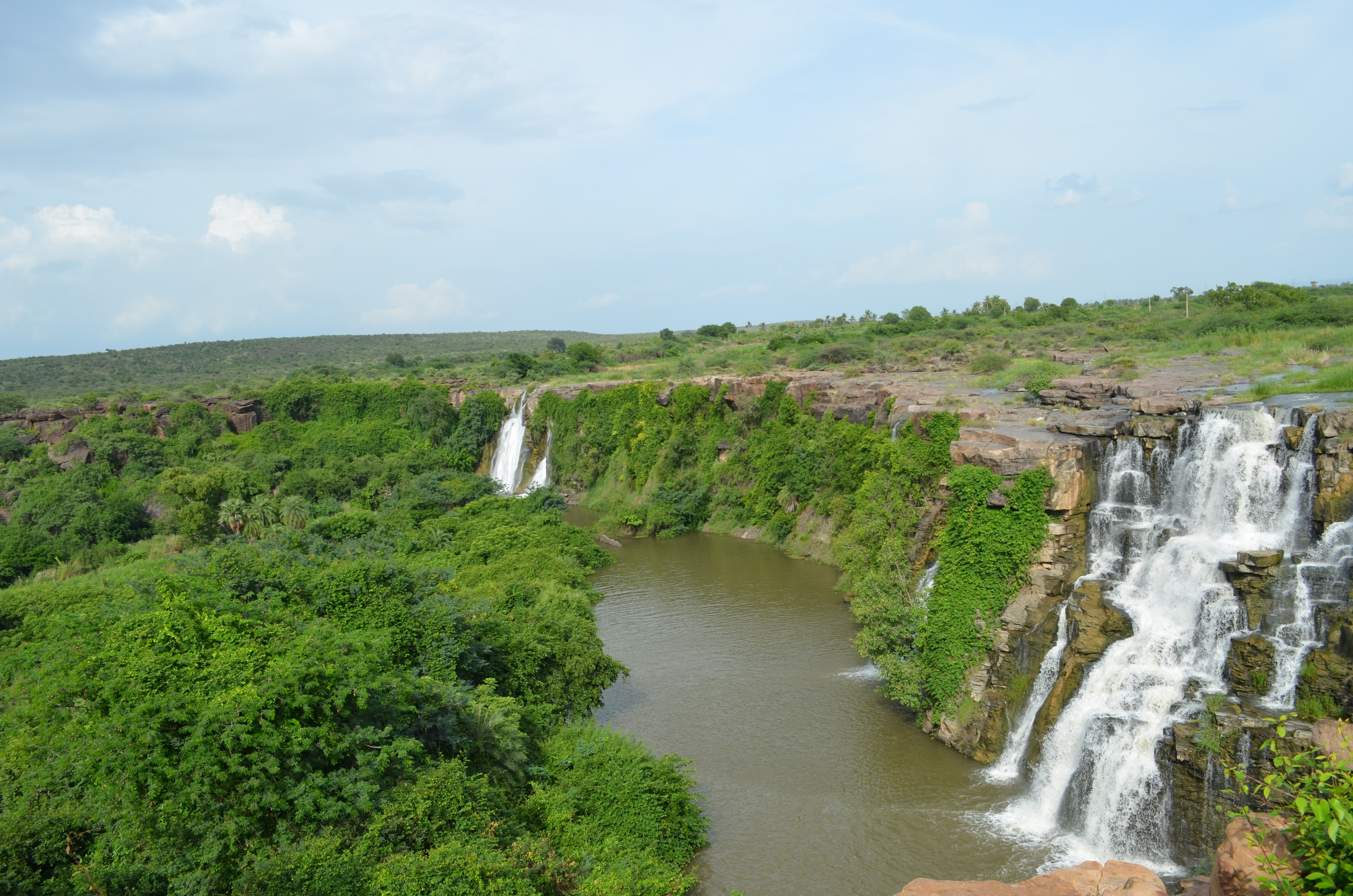

- Location within Andhra Pradesh
- Location: Palnadu district, Andhra Pradesh, India
- Coordinates: 16°32′13″N 79°24′27″E
- Type: Cascade
- Total height: 70 feet (21 m)

Ethipothala Falls is a 70 feet (21 m) high river cascade situated in Palnadu district, Andhra Pradesh, India. Located on the Chandravanka river, a tributary of the River Krishna joining on its right bank, the waterfall is formed by the confluence of three streams: Chandravanka Vagu, Nakkala Vagu, and Tummala Vagu. It is situated about 11 kilometres (6.8 mi) from Nagarjuna Sagar Dam. The river joins the Krishna river after travelling approximately 3 kilometres (1.9 mi) from the falls. A viewing point was established by the Andhra Pradesh Tourism Department on an adjacent hillock. A crocodile breeding centre is located in the pond formed by the waterfall. Water from the Nagarjuna Sagar right bank canal is released into the upstream channels to maintain the flow of the waterfall throughout the year for tourism purposes.

The site also holds religious significance, with a temple dedicated to Lord Dattatreya situated atop a small hillock near the falls.

== Dattatreya Temple ==
The site holds religious significance for the Lambadi tribal community of the surrounding area, for whom Lord Dattatreya is a principal deity. A temple dedicated to Ekamukhi Dattatreya is situated atop a small hillock adjacent to the falls. Below the hillock is the Madhumathy Devi Alayam. According to local tradition, worshippers visit the goddess first before proceeding to the Dattatreya shrine. The temple is noted for the rare combination of both Lord Dattatreya and Goddess Madhumathy Devi at a single site.

== Etymology of Ethipothala and Confusion ==
Ethipothala is derived from eththi, and potha of the Telugu language which means to "lift and pour". Alternatively it could also have been possibly derived from "eththu" (noun form of the verb eththi - 'lifting', and also the great height from which the water falls) and "potha", meaning the downpour as in kundapotha, connoting the downpour of water from a great height.

Incidentally the word ethipothala is also terminology coined in Telugu for lift irrigation. It is a misnomer for people to assume that Ethipothala Falls are part of the Lift Irrigation Scheme. As far as Ethipothala Falls are concerned it has nothing to do with the government's "Ethipothala Padhakam".

The reasons for this confusion is because the administration and media in the state widely use the term "Ethipothala Padhakam" to refer to the Lift Irrigation Scheme (LIS). Both terms are related to water bodies such as rivers, falls, canals, etc. There is also a major irrigation project named Nagarjuna Sagar located nearby Ethipothala Falls. This gives a scope for people to assume that these falls are part of that project, though that project does not concern the LIS.

=== Photos ===
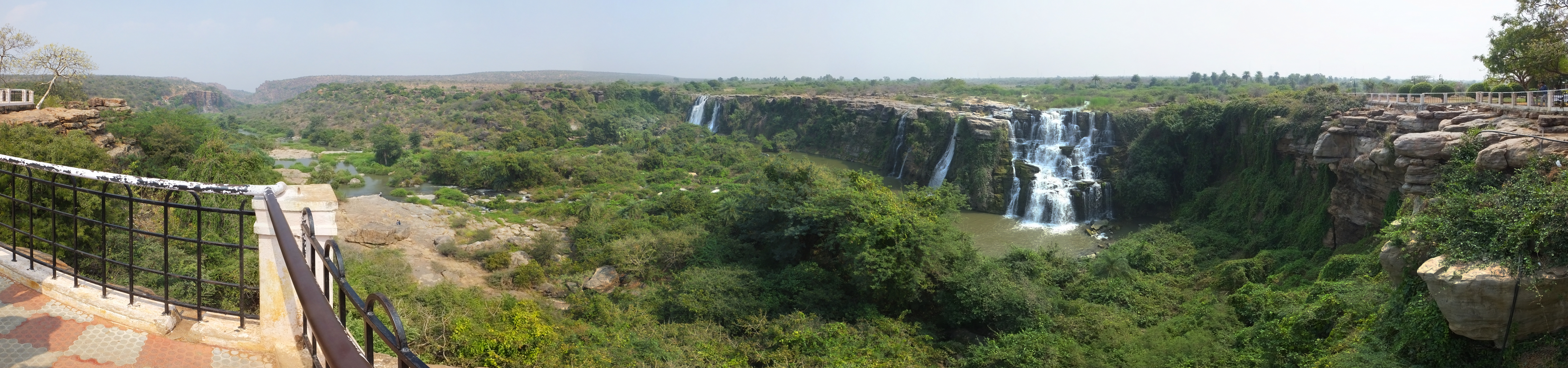
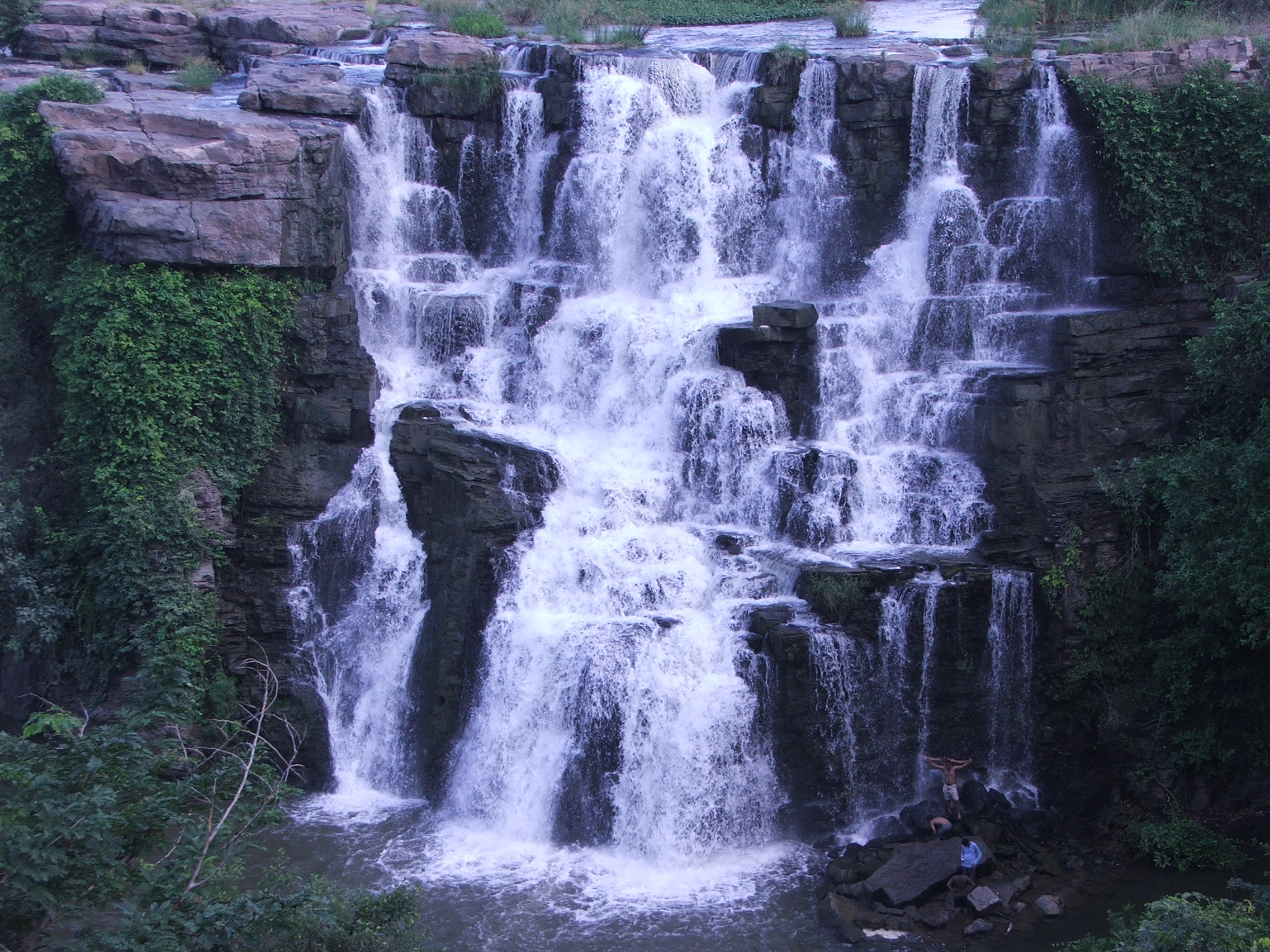
Ethipothala Waterfalls

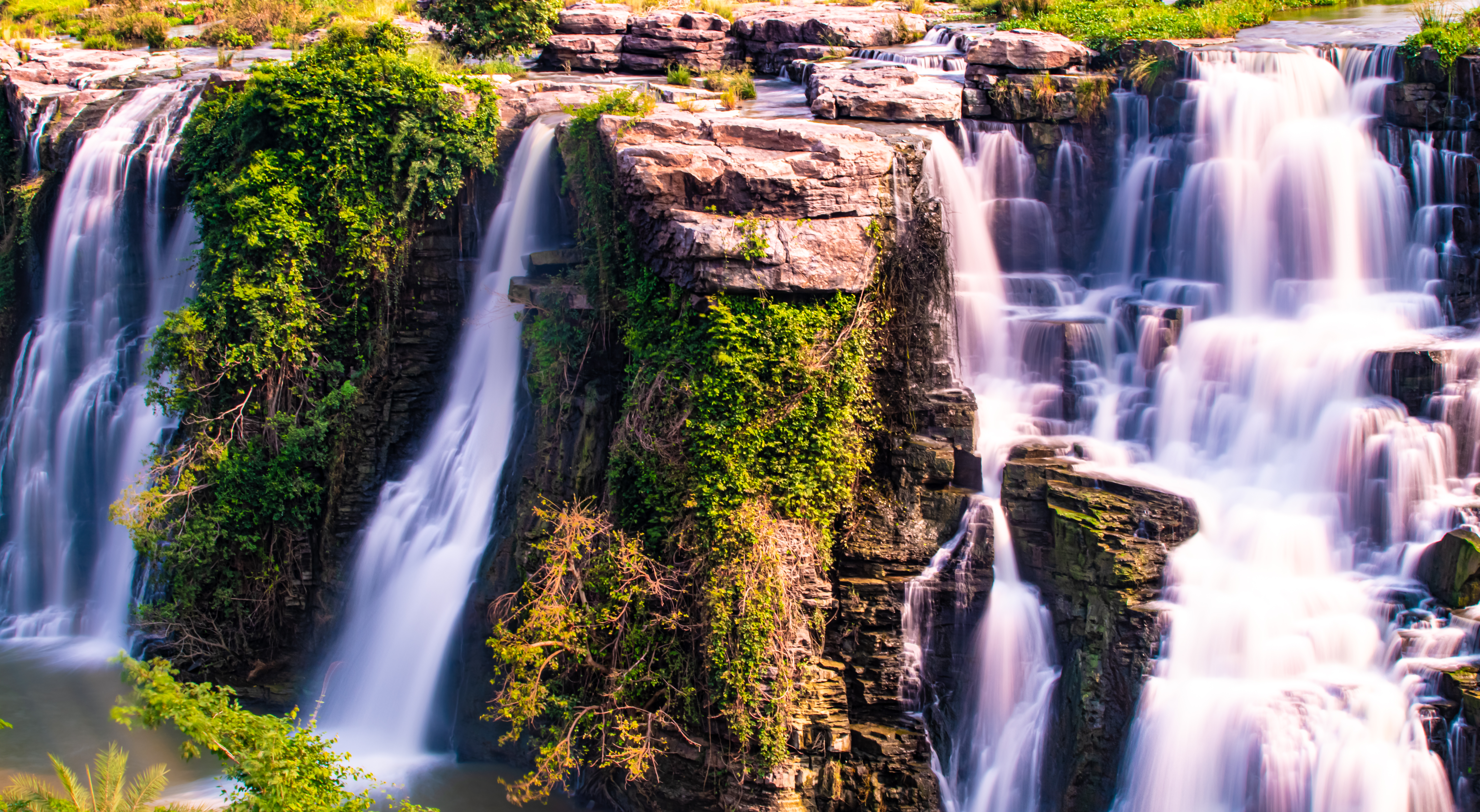

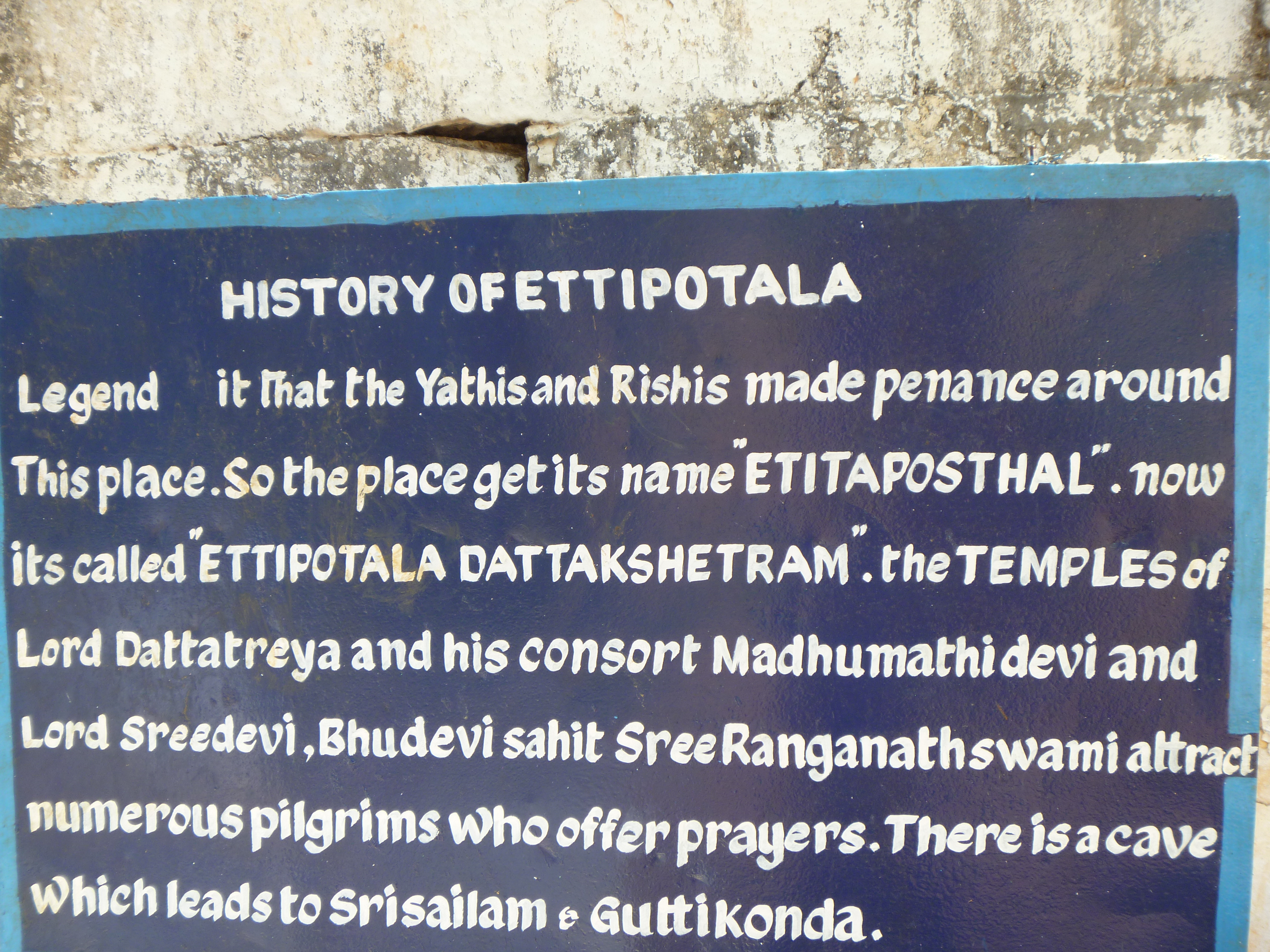
Information board describing how the waterfall's name came into use

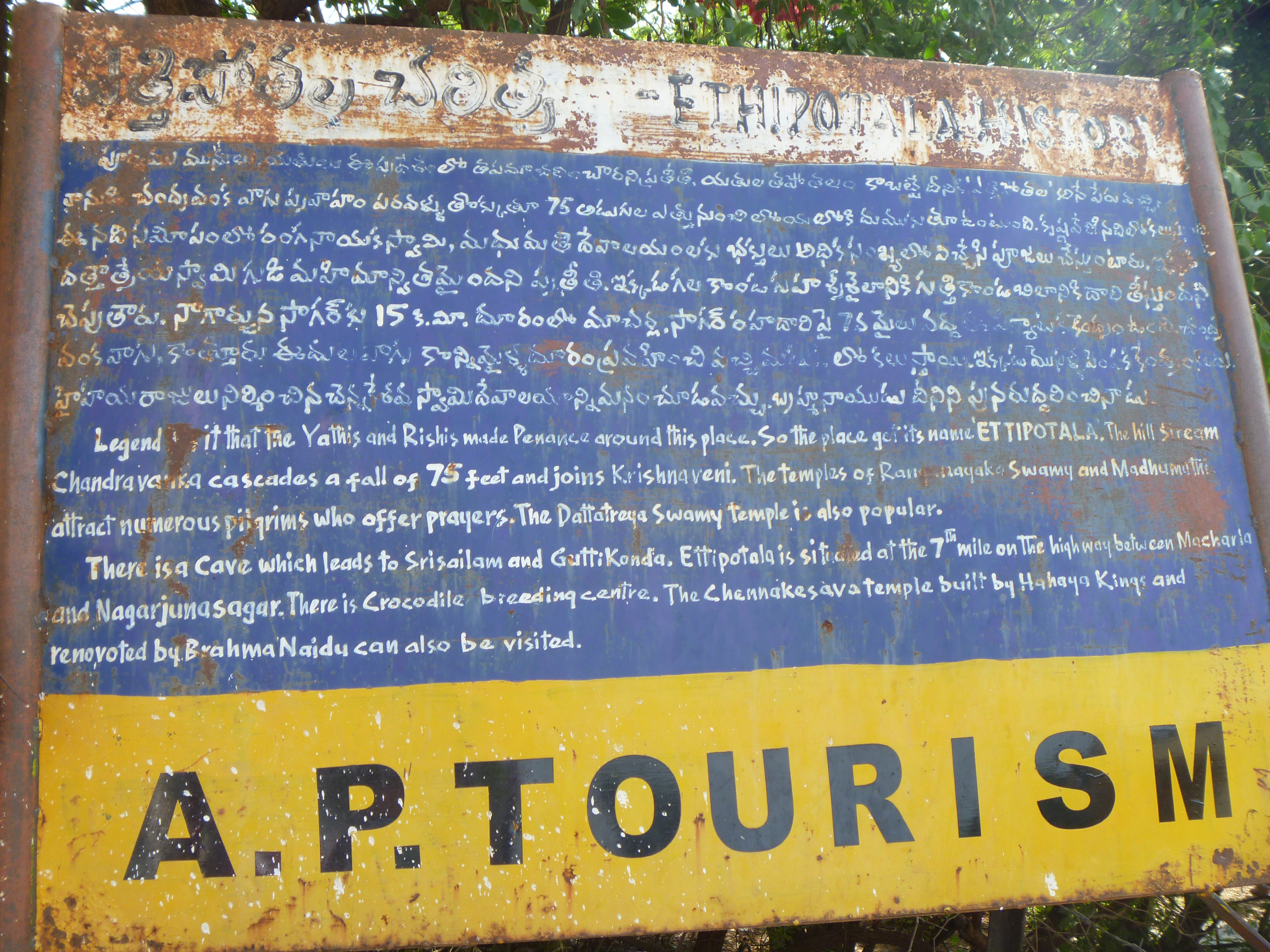
AP Tourism board on the origin of Ethipothala's name

== See also ==
- List of waterfalls
- List of waterfalls in India
