= Thallacheruvu =

- Village
- Interactive map of Thallacheruvu
- Location in Andhra Pradesh, India
- Coordinates: 16°38′54″N 80°05′46″E
- Country: India
- State: Andhra Pradesh
- District: Palnadu

Languages
  - Official: Telugu
- Time zone: UTC+5:30 (IST)
- PIN: 522409
- Telephone code: 08640
- Vehicle registration: AP–07, AP–08
- Nearest cities: Sattenapalli; Narasaraopeta; Guntur
- Lok Sabha constituency: Narasaraopeta
- Vidhan Sabha constituency: Peddakurapadu
- Website: WWW.thallacheruvu.com

Thallacheruvu is a village in Palnadu district of the Indian state of Andhra Pradesh. It is located in Atchampeta mandal of Guntur revenue division. It is a part of Andhra Pradesh Capital Region.

The name of the village is derived from thalla, meaning "palm trees", and cheruvu, meaning "pond" or "lake". The majority of people here are Catholics.

== Geography ==
Thallacheruvu is situated northwest of Guntur, in the state of Andhra Pradesh.
