= Nallapadu–Nandyal section =

Railway line in India

Guntur–Guntakal section
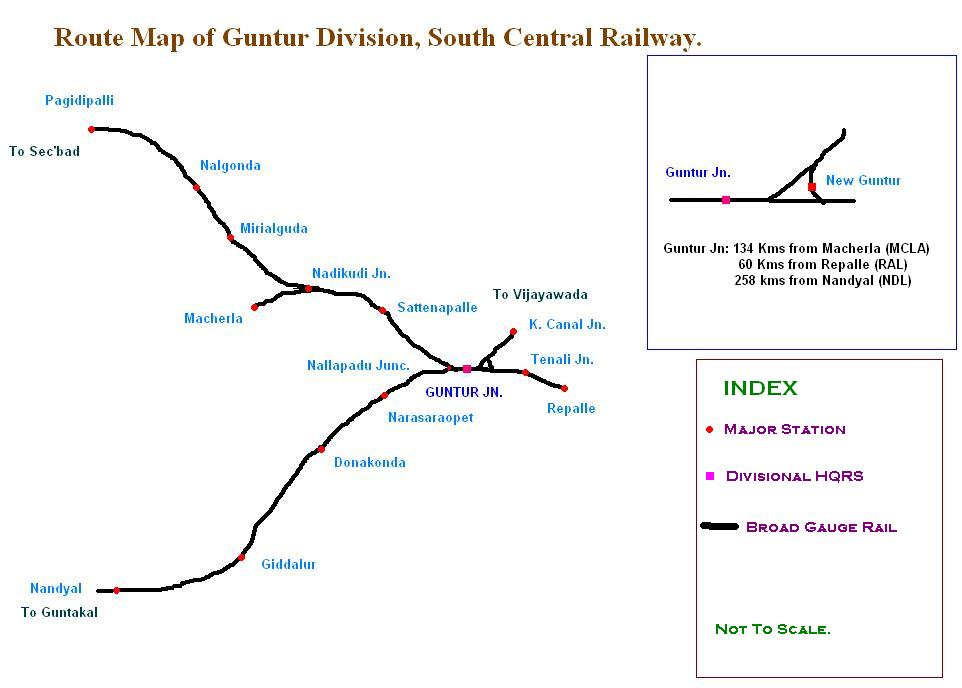
- Schematic diagram showing Nallapadu–Nandyal_section of Guntur Railway Division

Overview
- Status: Operational
- Owner: Indian Railways
- Locale: Andhra Pradesh
- Termini: Nallapadu; Nandyal

Service
- Operator: South Coast Railway

Technical
- Line length: 256.91 km (159.64 mi)
- Track gauge: 5 ft 6 in (1,676 mm) broad gauge
- Electrification: Yes, 25 kV AC 50 Hz
- Operating speed: 110 km/h (68 mph)
Route map
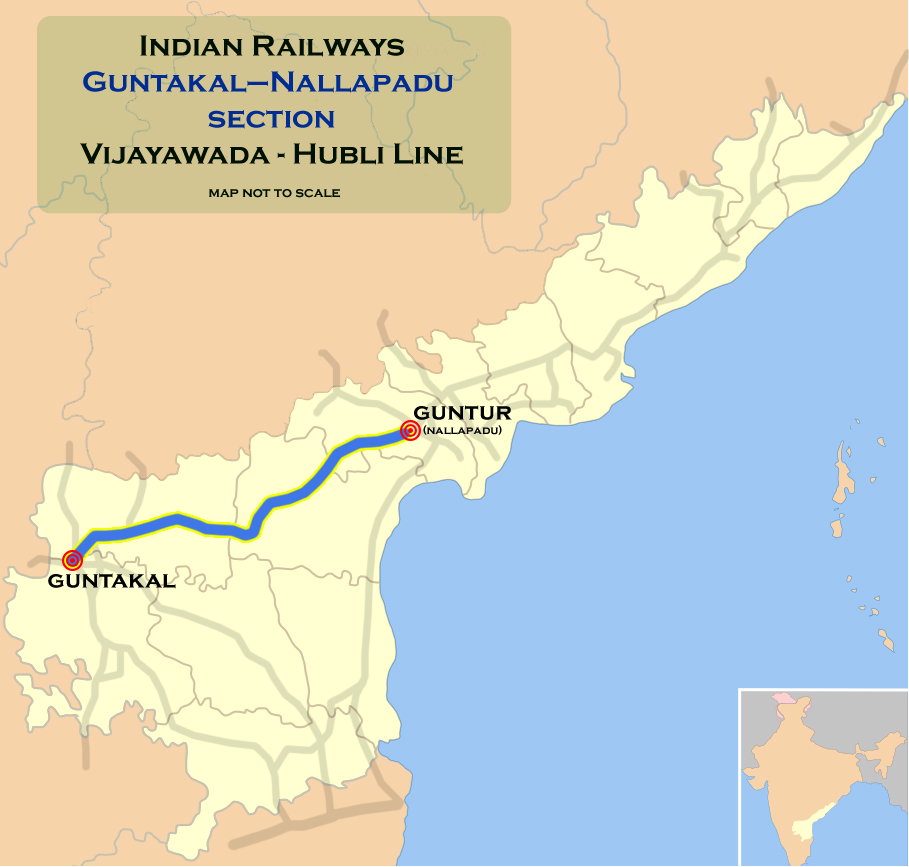

Nallapadu–Nandyal section connects Nallapadu and Nandyal of Guntur district in the Indian state of Andhra Pradesh. Further, this section converges with Nallapadu–Pagidipalli section at Nallapadu. The branch line is an electrified single-track railway.

== Meter Gauge & Broad Gauge Era ==
Nallapadu–Nandyal section was constructed as a Meter Gauge railway line in 1891/92 by the British. The Magnificent Dorabhavi Viaduct used to span in the Nallamalla Range. The Viaduct 1,024 metres (3,360 ft) long spanning over 8 high pillars around 125 metres (410 ft) was an architectural & engineering wonder. The Viaduct was dismantled after the Guntur Junction–Guntakal Junction section was made Broad Gauge in 1997/98. The 1,350 metres (4,430 ft) long Bogada Tunnel & 1,250 metres (4,100 ft) long Chellama Tunnel in the Meter Gauge alignment were sealed in 1997/98 & a new 1,600 metres (5,200 ft) long Bogada Tunnel & 1,000 metres (3,300 ft) long Chellama Tunnel were constructed in 1997/98 in the Broad Gauge line. Guntur Junction–Guntakal Junction section is 401 kilometres (249 mi) long & currently doubling of Nandyal & Guntakal is going on.

== Important trains ==
Vijayawada-Hubballi Amravathi Express, Shalimar(near Howrah)-Vasco Da Gama(nearMadgaon) Amravathi Express, Bhubaneswar-Bengaluru Prasanti Express are the legendary trains in this route. Vijayawada-Hubballi Amravathi Express & Bhubaneswar-Bengaluru(ErstwhileVijayawada-KSR Bengaluru) Prasanti Express were previously Meter Gauge era trains, later re-introduced in Broad Gauge post gauge conversion in 1997/98. Amravathi Express was extended to Howrah on 2008. Recently Howrah-Satya Sai Express & Kondaveedu Express Train are also heavy demand trains in this route.

== Jurisdiction ==
This branch line is having a length of 256.9 km (159.6 mi) and is administered under Guntur railway division of South Coast Railway zone.
