= Kotappakonda =

Hindu temple in Andhra Pradesh, India

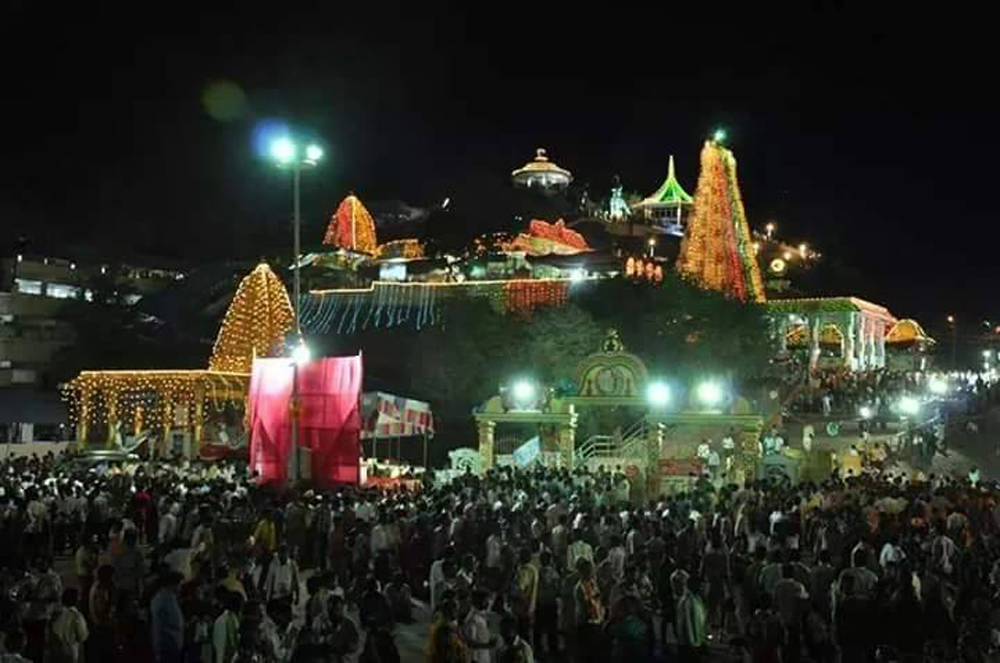
- Trikoteswara Swamy Temple during Maha Shivaratri

- Location in Andhra Pradesh

Religion
- Affiliation: Hinduism
- District: Palnadu
- Festival: Maha Shivaratri

Location
- State: Andhra Pradesh
- Country: India
- Coordinates: 16.145°N 80.039°E

Architecture
- Type: Dravidian
- Creator: Associated with legends of Anandavalli (Gollabhama)
- Established: Unknown date

Website
- Official website

Kotappakonda is a hill and Hindu pilgrimage site in Palnadu district, Andhra Pradesh, India. It lies about 62 km from Guntur city and 20 km from Narasaraopet. The hill has a Trikoteswara Swamy Temple to Shiva.

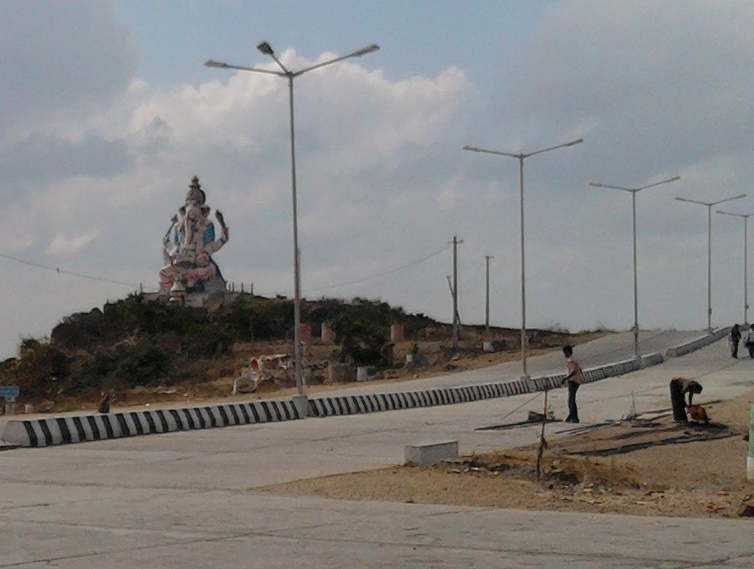
Vinayaka (Ganesha) statue on the way to the hilltop

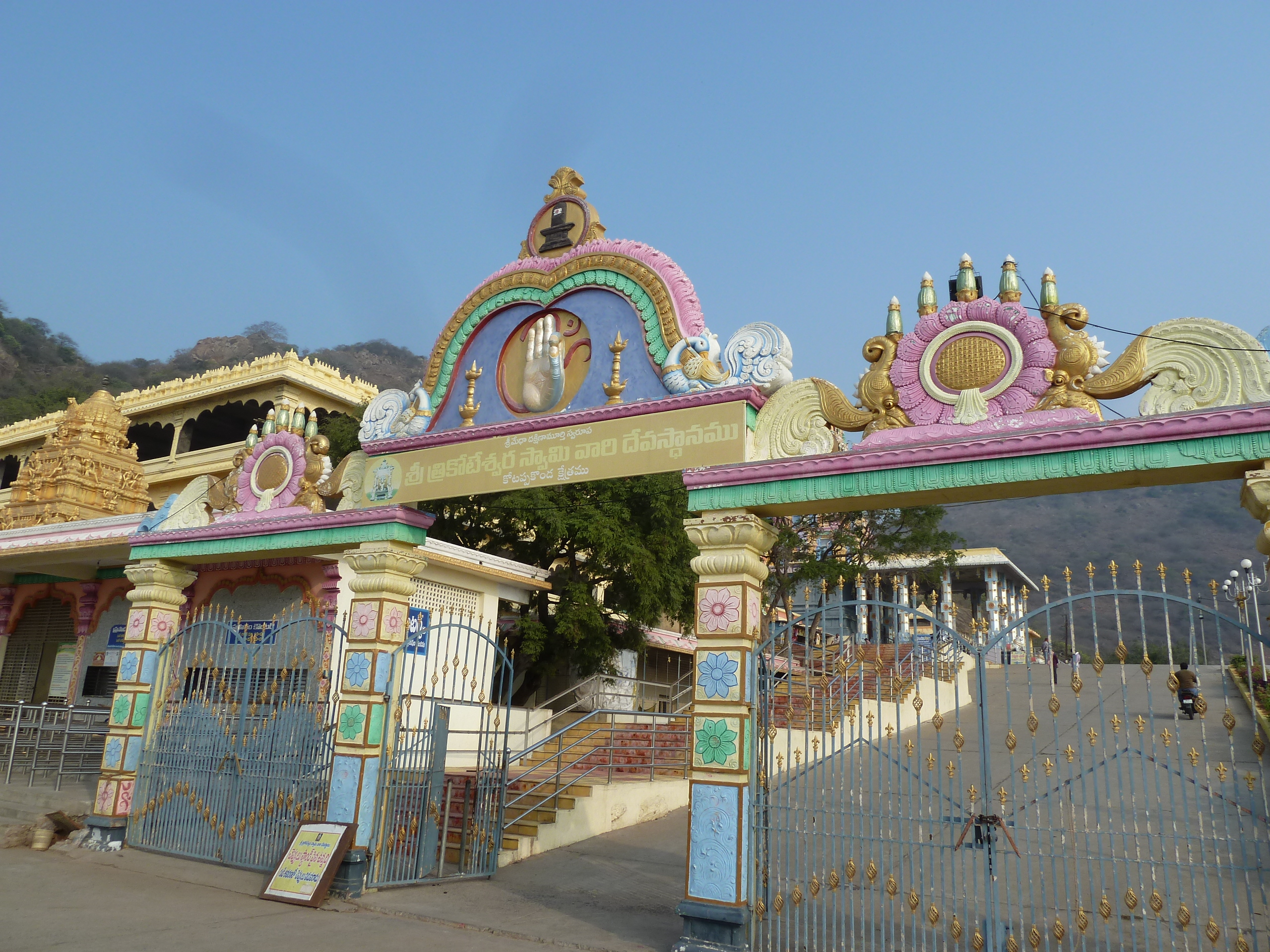
Temple entrance
