= Kammavaari palem, Nellore district =

Kammavaari palem
- village
- Interactive map of Kammavaari palem
- Location in Andhra Pradesh, India
- Country: India
- State: Andhra Pradesh
- District: Nellore
- Elevation: 7 m (23 ft)

Population (2001)
  - Total: 2,000

Languages
  - Official: Telugu
- Time zone: UTC+5:30 (IST)
- PIN: 524223
- Telephone code: (91)8626

Kammavaari palem is a village in Nellore district in the Indian state of Andhra Pradesh.

== Demographics ==
As of 2001 India census, Kammavaari palem had a population of 2000. Kammavaari palem has an average literacy rate of 30%, lower than the national average of 59.5%.
