= Kammavaripalem, Nandigama mandal =

Kammavari Palem
- village
- Interactive map of Kammavari Palem
- Location in Andhra Pradesh, India Kammavari Palem (India)
- Coordinates: 16°46′02″N 80°19′54″E
- Country: India
- State: Andhra Pradesh
- District: NTR

Languages
  - Official: Telugu
- Time zone: UTC+5:30 (IST)
- PIN: 521185
- Telephone code: +8678
- Vehicle registration: AP39
- Nearest city: Vijayawada
- Lok Sabha constituency: Vijayawada
- Vidhan Sabha constituency: Nandigama

Kamma Vari Palem is a village in NTR district of Andhra Pradesh state in southern India. The main occupation is agriculture.

The village is surrounded by the Muneru and Vireru lakes.
