= Palnadu Satyagraha =

1920s protest movement in British India

The Palnadu Satyagraha was a non-violent protest movement that occurred among the residents of the Palnadu district of India against the British Raj in the 1920s.

== Background ==
The Palnad taluka lies in the coastal belt of Andhra Pradesh in India. Though celebrated in tradition as a "land of heroes," the taluka made little economic progress under British rule, and its means of communication remained primitive. Its land was dry, irrigation was scarce, and by far the greater portion of it was unfit for tillage. The forests, however, yielded fodder in plenty, and the people had consequently depended on cattle-rearing from early times. Declaring these forests "Reserves," the British government imposed on them a burdensome grazing levy known as Pullari. From the department's creation in 1878, the Forest Administration sought to regulate how the jungles and lands unfit for cultivation were used. That control cut off the people's customary access to land on which they had grazed their cattle and from which they had gathered crude manure, firewood and food. The local population was subjected to repeated hardship at the hands of the subordinate forest staff, and grazing cattle, cutting fuel and collecting leaf manure all cost them heavy fees.

== Reason for discontent ==
The tract suffered a failure of rains from 1919 to 1921 that wrecked its economy, and the people kept themselves alive on leaves, roots and tree bark, together with wild produce from the jungle. Stricter application of the law at this juncture stirred deep resentment among the population, who were angered by the indifference of the forest officials and by the subsidies the government had announced but never paid out. The masses grew restive and, with the whole atmosphere surcharged by ideas of non-co-operation, resolved to give their discontent expression in some form.

== Execution of a movement ==
The executive of the Guntur District Congress Committee, meeting on 14 November 1921, decided to set up panchayats in Palnad to ready the people for civil disobedience and to send thirty zealous workers to carry on Congress’s plan. Goli Mallikarjuna Sastry attended these deliberations as an observer. People in thousands, drawn from village after village, stood prepared to graze their cattle in the forest without paying the grazing fee, and with this civil disobedience was inaugurated. Macherla, together with the villages in its neighbourhood, formed the centre of the boycott. Its effect was such that the officials could not obtain the services of even washermen, barbers, shopkeepers, hotel-keepers or milkmen. The District Collector, who was encamped there, could get neither supplies nor conveyance, whether for himself or for the District Superintendent of Police. When he sought to proclaim his orders to the villagers by beat of tom-tom, the village munsiff informed him that every drum used for tom-toming in the village had been damaged. The social boycott proved a complete success.

== Reactionary policies by officers ==
In the months that followed, with non-co-operation rising in the district, the government resolved to enforce the forest regulations in Palnad with rigour. A grazing tax of Re. 0-12-0 (Re. 0.75) on each cow and Re. 1-8-0 (Re. 1.50) on each buffalo for every six months was levied in the "Reserves." Goats were denounced as enemies of the forest and barred from entering it. Any person found in the forest without a permit was prosecuted. In Julakallu and Kallagunta the people, unable to pay the grazing tax, had to part with their cattle at throwaway prices. Most of the forest officials were corrupt. The villagers of Wutacherla spent the greater part of their income on bribing the officers, and on lawyers' fees to extricate themselves from the prosecution cases the police had brought against them. On February 16 and 17, 1922, when the villagers of Jangameswarapuram, Ramapuram, Jettipalem and Minchalapadu could not pay the grazing tax, the Collector of Guntur proceeded to these villages with Armed Reserve and Mounted Police in February 1922 and distrained their cattle in very large numbers.

== Demands of Andhra Provincial Congress Committee ==
As the situation turned grave, the Andhra Provincial Congress Committee met in July 1921 to consider the matter and deputed Unnava Lakshminarayana and Vedantam Narasimhachari, two prominent leaders of Guntur, to visit the area and report after a detailed enquiry. Lakshminarayana placed the long-standing demands of the people of Palnad before the District Collector. He represented that:

1. half the forest should be constituted a reserved forest and the other half left unreserved
2. the grazing tax should be levied at reduced rates
3. the ryots should be free to cut wood in the forest for making agricultural implements
4. head-loads of fodder should be allowed out of the forest once permits had been obtained
5. the people should be permitted to gather leaves
6. on payment of a single instalment of taxes the cattle should be free to graze anywhere in the forests of the district for a full year
7. forest lands fit for agriculture should be allotted to the ryots on application
8. cattle found grazing without payment of taxes in the "Reserves" might be impounded, but no compound fees should be collected from their owners

The Collector, however, declined to change any of the laws.

== Imprisonments and resistance ==
The Collector feared that the presence of the two leaders would only worsen the situation and lead to a breach of the peace, and issued summons requiring them to appear before him and show cause. The people escorted them to the Collector's camp in a grand procession, accompanied by the drums the Collector had never before been able to secure. Provoked by this, and by the leaders' refusal to execute a bond and furnish security, he sentenced them to one year's imprisonment.

Word that these two leaders had been jailed, along with three Muslim boycotters, spread to other parts of Guntur district, and protest meetings were held in many places. A no-tax campaign was also put into practical effect by driving cattle into the reserved forests without paying the usual Pullari. Many clashes broke out between the people on one side and the police and forest officials on the other. When cattle were impounded, the people overpowered the police and rescued the animals. The inhabitants of Jattipalem rescued by force over a hundred cattle which, found grazing without permits, had been impounded by the Forest Department. In Mutulcur the forest rules were repeatedly defied by the inhabitants of the village. In Jangameswarapuram a person arrested under Section 188 Cr.P.C. was rescued from custody by the villagers. In response, the Government increased the number of forest guards and posted additional police in the area. It was feared that the people would come into collision with them and that mob violence might break out; the Congress of the Gandhian era therefore withheld its support from this Satyagraha, declaring that the violation of forest laws should cease. The villagers concerned, however, were unwilling to call off the campaign and went on sending their cattle into the forests without paying the grazing fees.

== The final controversy ==
On 26 February, late in the afternoon, a crowd of two to three hundred men and women attacked the forest officers and a Sub-Inspector of Police leading a party of twenty constables with showers of sharply pointed stones. The Sub-Inspector ordered his men to fire, with the result that three fell dead and several were wounded. The death of their leader Hanumanth, the large number of arrests that followed, and the continued use of force by the police broke the spirit of the inhabitants. Moreover, by the end of February the momentum of the Civil Disobedience Movement in the district had weakened as a consequence of the Bardoli resolutions. By 1st March, 1922, the Collector was able to report, "Most of the villagers are now paying up their pullari (grazing fees) and the villagers of Mutkur, which has been a particularly troublesome place both for non-payment of kist and Pullari and for boycotting and molesting of forest officers." Thus the forest Satyagraha of Palnad came to an end.
