= Narasaraopet mandal =

- Mandal
- Interactive map outlining mandal
- Location in Andhra Pradesh, India
- Coordinates: 16°14′34″N 80°38′24″E
- Country: India
- State: Andhra Pradesh
- District: Guntur
- Headquarters: Narasaraopet

Government
  - Body: Mandal Parishad
  - Tehsildar: M.Leela Sanjeeva Kumari

Population (2011)
  - Total: 211,948

Languages
  - Official: Telugu
- Time zone: UTC+5:30 (IST)

Narasaraopet mandal is one of the 28 mandals in Guntur district of the India state of Andhra Pradesh. It is under the administration of Narasaraopet revenue division and the headquarters are located at Narasaraopet city. The mandal is bounded by Rompicherla, Nekarikallu, Muppalla, Phirangipuram, Nadendla and Chilakaluripeta. It also borders Prakasam district.

== Demographics ==
As of 2011 census, the mandal had a population of 211,948. The total population constitute, 106,926 males and 105,022 females —a sex ratio of 982 females per 1000 males. 21,370 children are in the age group of 0–6 years, of which 10,953 are boys and 10,417 are girls —a ratio of 951 per 1000. The average literacy rate stands at 72.09% with 137,390 literates.

== Settlement ==
As of 2011 census, the mandal has 20 settlements. It includes 1 town, 2 out growths and 15 villages.

The settlements in the mandal are listed below:

1. Dondapadu Agraharam
2. Ellamanda
3. Guntagarlapadu Agraharam
4. Allurivari palem
5. Ikkurru
6. Jonnalagadda
7. Kakani
8. Kesanapalle
9. Kondakavuru
10. Lingamguntla Agraharam (Rural) (OG)
11. Mulakaluru
12. Narasaraopet (M)
13. Narasaraopet (Rural) (OG)
14. Palapadu
15. Pamidipadu Agraharam
16. Petlurivaripalem
17. Pothavarappadu
18. Ravipadu
19. Uppalapadu
20. Visappalem

Note: M-Municipality, OG-Out Growth

- Lingamguntla Agraharam (Rural) and Narasaraopet (Rural) are out growths to Narasaraopet (M).

== Administration ==
The mandal is under the control of a tahsildar and the present tahsildar is M.Leela Sanjeeva Kumari. Narasaraopet mandal is one of the 2 mandals under Narasaraopet (Assembly constituency), which in turn represents Narasaraopet (Lok Sabha constituency) of Andhra Pradesh.

== Education ==
The mandal plays a major role in education for the rural students of the nearby villages. The primary and secondary school education is imparted by government, aided and private schools, under the School Education Department of the state. As per the school information report for the academic year 2015–16, the mandal has more than 33,498 students enrolled in over 195 schools.

== See also ==
- List of mandals in Andhra Pradesh
- Villages in Narasaraopet mandal
