= Pagidipalli–Nallapadu section =

Railway line in India

Pagidipalli–Guntur section
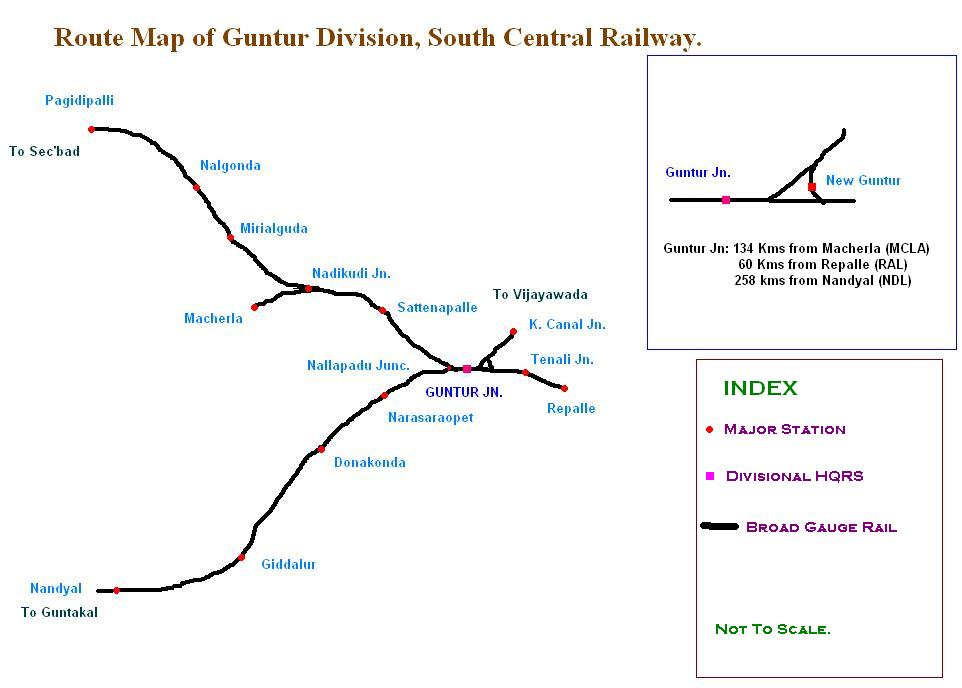
- Route map of Guntur Division showing Pagidipalli–Nallapadu section

Overview
- Status: Operational
- Owner: Indian Railways
- Locale: Telangana; Andhra Pradesh
- Termini: Guntur Junction; Pagidipalli
- Website: scr.indianrailways.gov.in

Service
- Operator: South Coast Railway zone

History
- Opened: 1930; 96 years ago

Technical
- Line length: 238.49 km (148 mi)
- Track length: 130 km (81 mi)
- Number of tracks: 1 (doubling approved in year 2023)
- Track gauge: 5 ft 6 in (1,676 mm) broad gauge
- Electrification: 25 kV AC 50 Hz
- Operating speed: 110 km/h (68 mph)

The Pagidipalli–Guntur section is an electrified single track railway section under the jurisdiction of Secunderabad railway division of South Coastl Railway and Guntur railway division of South Coast Railway.

== History ==
The Guntur–Macherla section was opened in 1930. A new railway line from Bibinagar to Nadikudi was started in 1974, and foundation stone was laid by then-Prime Minister of India Indira Gandhi on 7 April 1974. It opened for traffic in 1989 there by making connectivity between Guntur Junction and Secunderabad Junction.

In 2023, the Centre cleared the doubling of Guntur–Bibinagar railway. The long-pending project is estimated to cost 2,853 crore and will be monitored by the Prime Minister's Office.

== Route ==
This route starts from Pagidipalli (near Bibinagar) and passes through Nalgonda, Miryalaguda, Nadikudi, Piduguralla, Sattenapalle and joins Nallapadu near Guntur.
