= Palnadu district =

District in Andhra Pradesh, India

Coordinates: 16.2°N 80.0°E

Palnadu District
- District of Andhra Pradesh
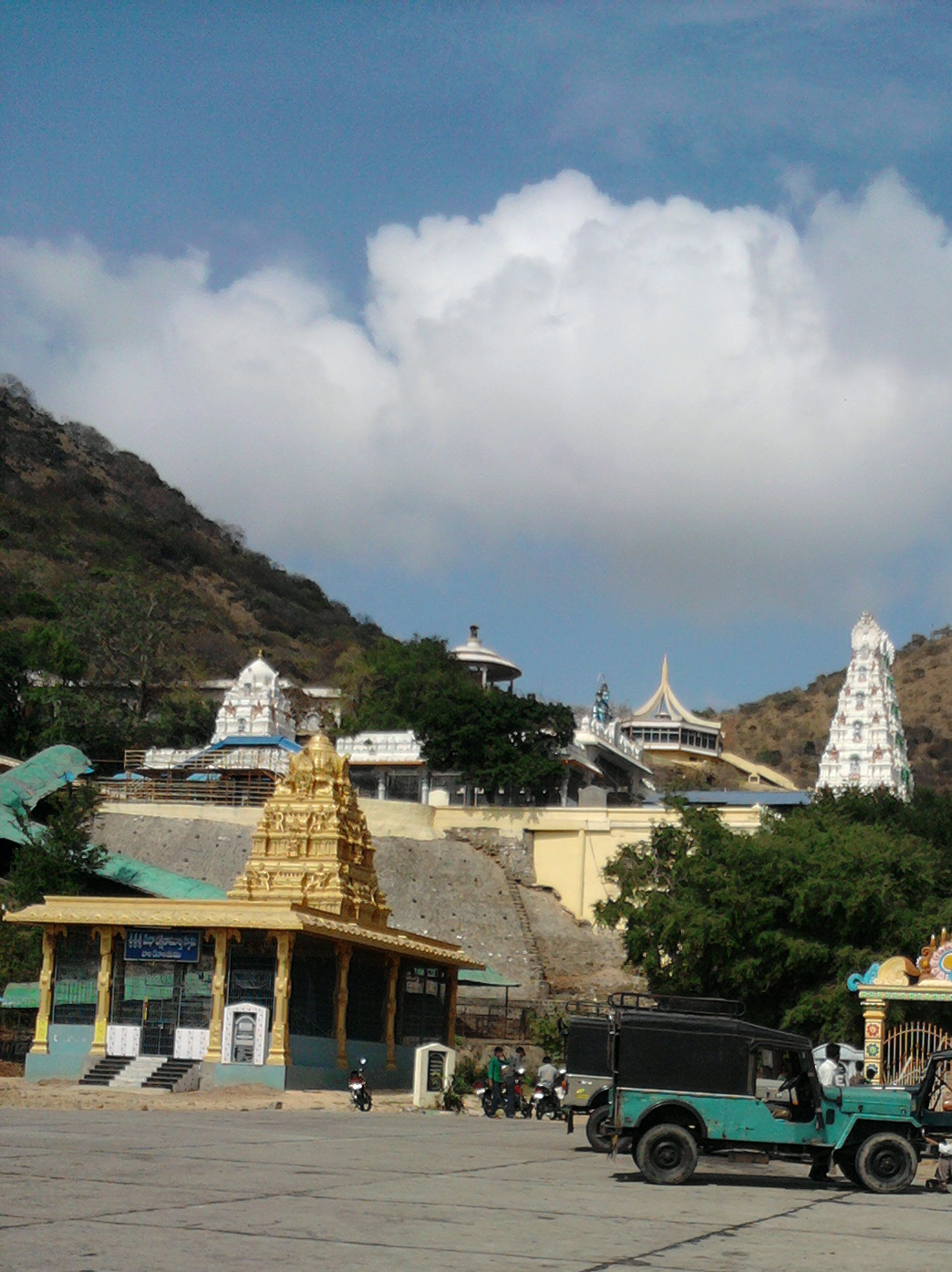
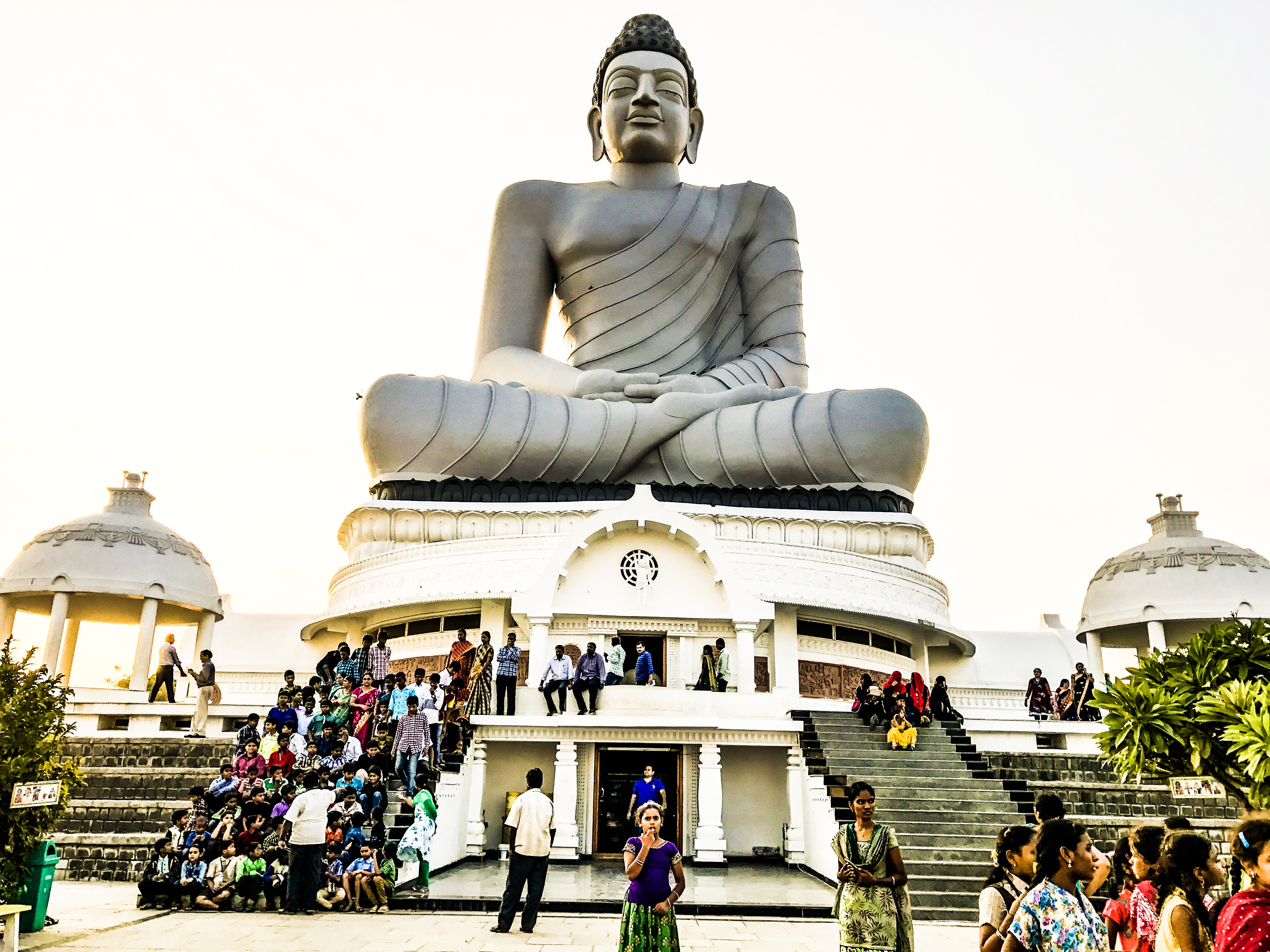
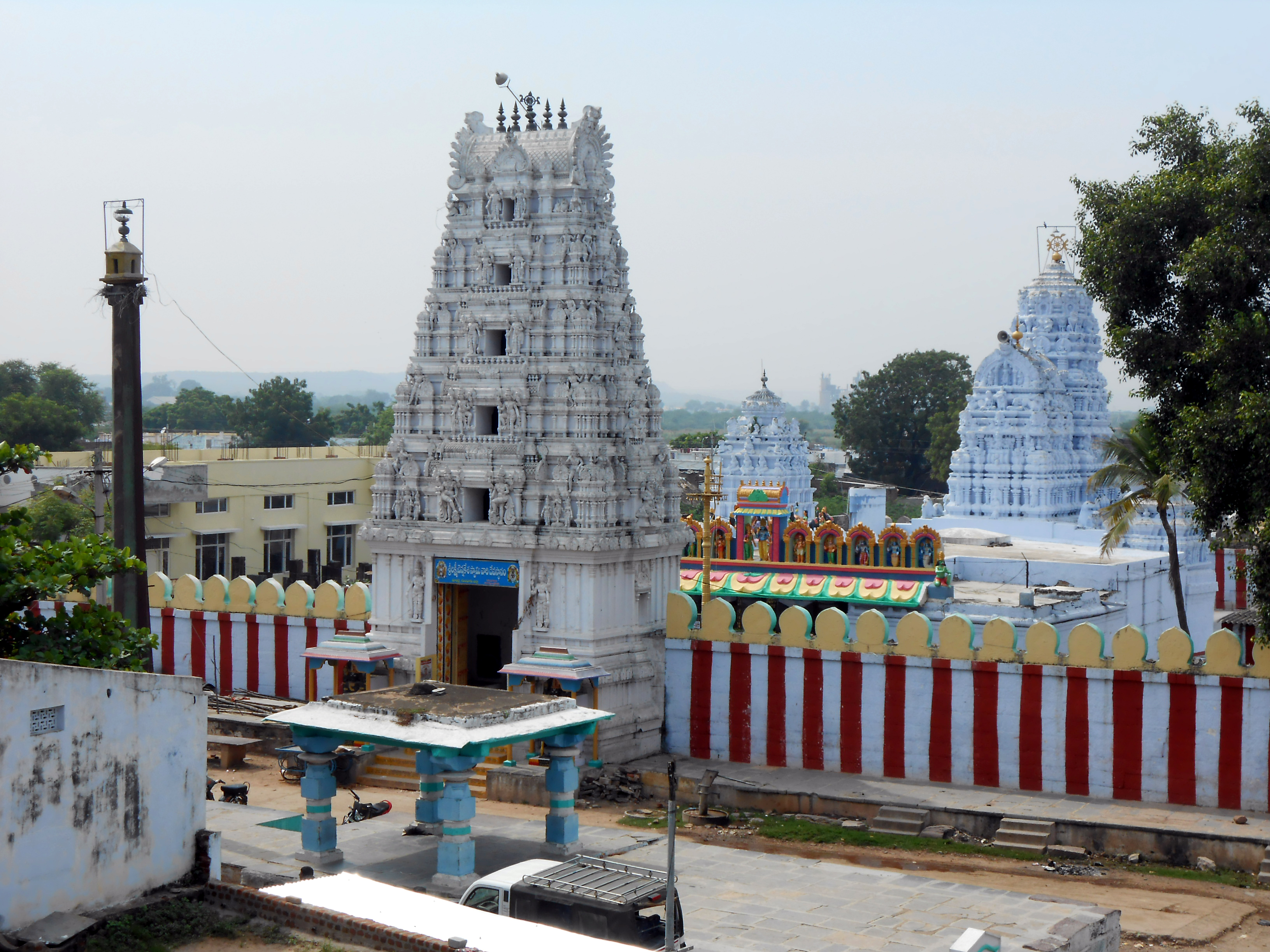
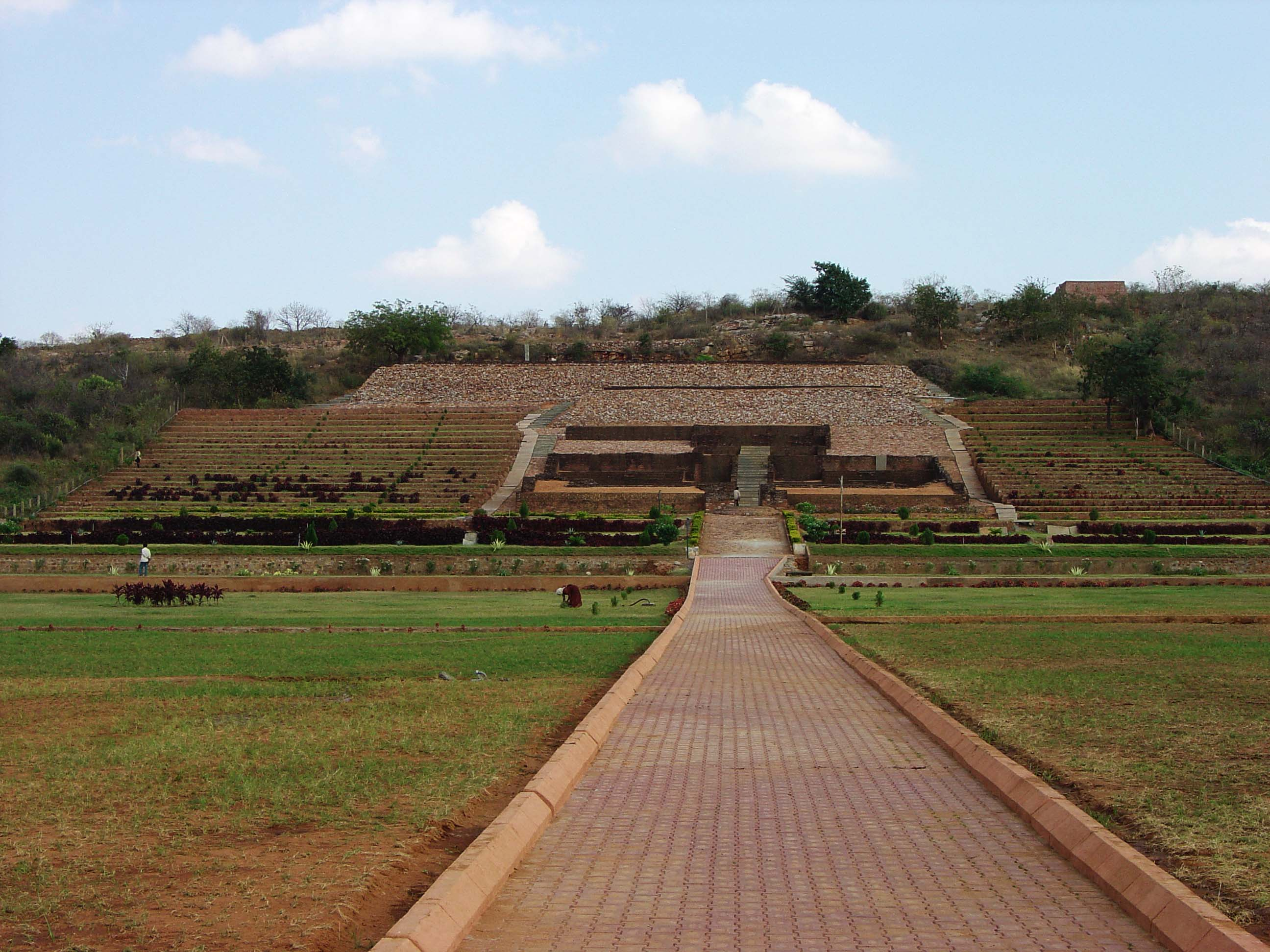
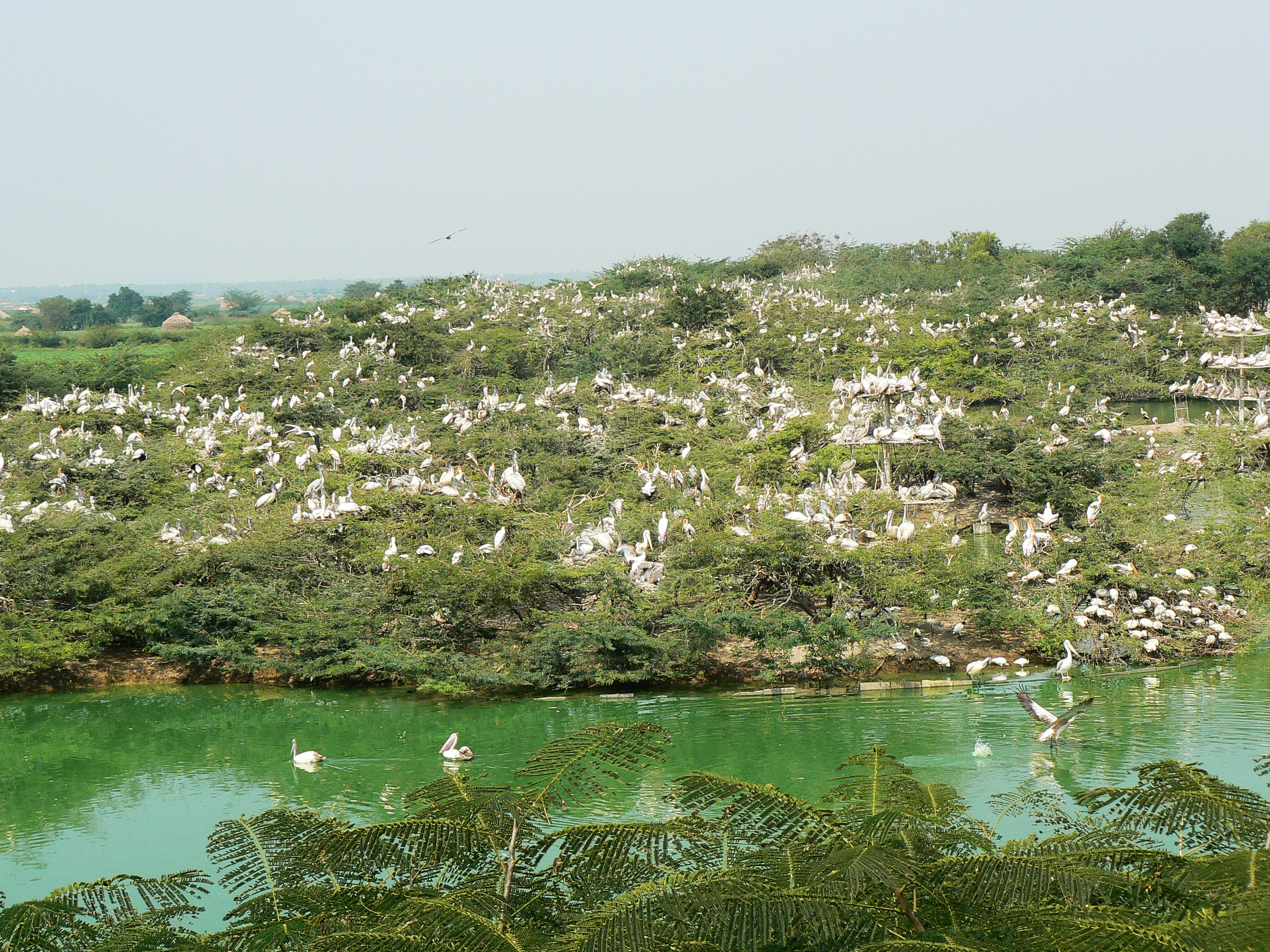
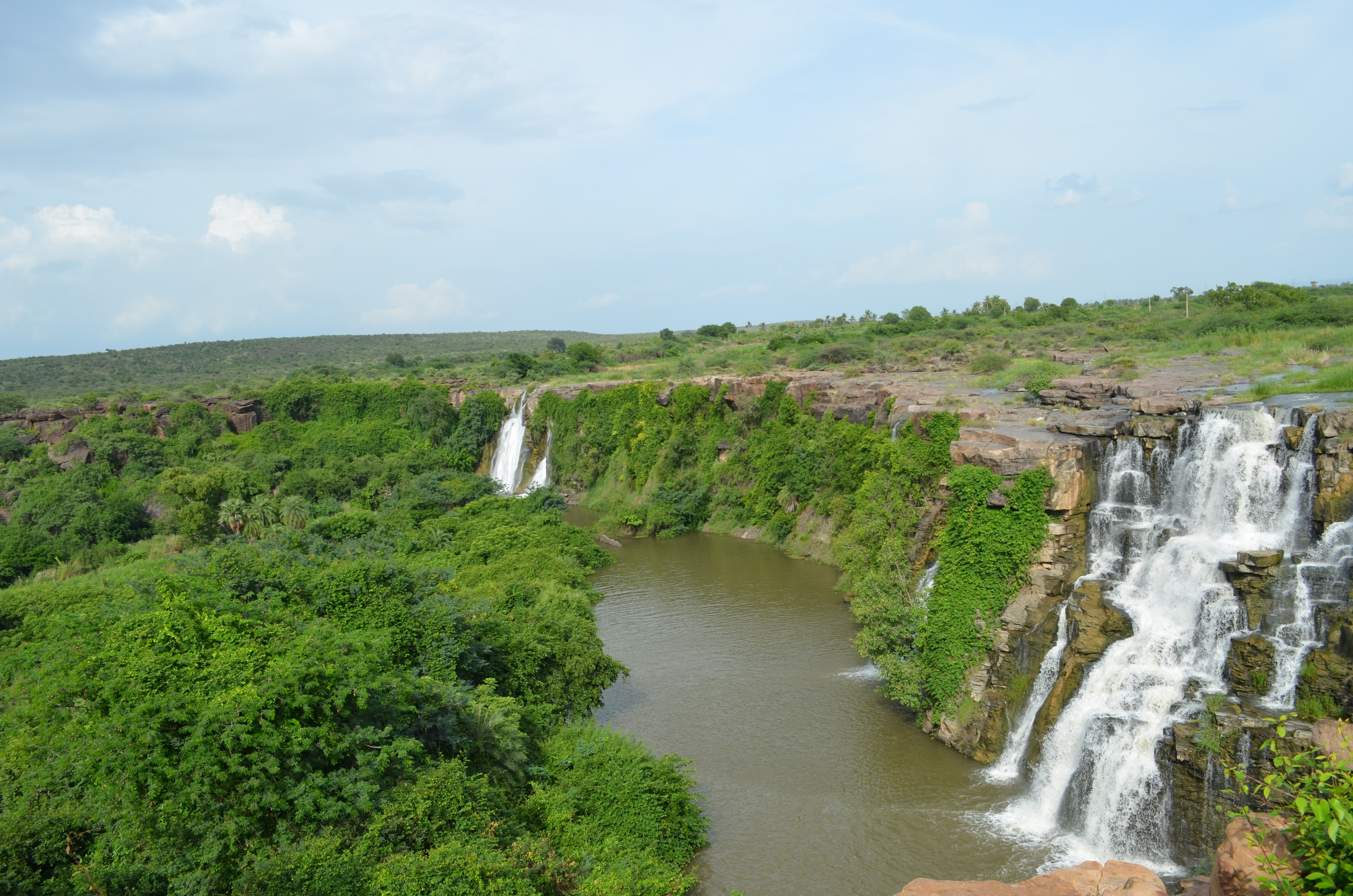
- Clockwise from top-left: Kotappakonda, Dhyana Buddha statue in Amaravati, Lakshmi Channakeshava Swami Temple in Macherla, Pelicans in Uppalapadu Bird Sanctuary, Ethipothala Falls, Buddhist monuments in Anupu

- Location of Palnadu district in Andhra Pradesh
- Interactive map of Palnadu District
- Country: India
- State: Andhra Pradesh
- Region: Kosta Andhra
- Established: 4 April 2022
- Headquarters: Narasaraopet
- Administrative divisions: 3 revenue divisions; 28 mandals

Government
  - District collector and magistrate: P. Arun Babu, I.A.S.
  - Superintendent of Police: Kanchi Srinivasa Rao, I.P.S.
  - Lok Sabha constituency: Narasaraopet
  - MP: Lavu Sri Krishna Devarayalu
  - Assembly constituencies: 07

Area
  - Total: 7,298 km^{2} (2,818 sq mi)

Population (2011)
  - Total: 2,041,723
  - Density: 279.8/km^{2} (724.6/sq mi)
- Time zone: UTC+05:30 (IST)
- District LGD code: 751
- District abbreviation: PLN
- Website: palnadu.ap.gov.in

Palnadu district is a district in the Kosta Andhra region in the Indian state of Andhra Pradesh. It was formed on 4 April 2022 with Narasaraopet as its administrative headquarters.

== Etymology ==
This district has derived its name from the Palnadu, also historically referred to as Pallava Nadu, the “land of the Pallavas”. The term originates from the early Pallava clans who originated in this region before they later expanded their influence toward the Tamil plains.

== History ==
The district was formed on 4th April 2020 from Gurazala, Sattenapalli and Narasaraopet revenue divisions of erstwhile Guntur district.

=== Palnadu Forest Satyagraha ===
Palnadu and its surrounding forests were the site of the Palnadu Satyagraha, a protest against the British rule of the area focused on the rights of residents to forage plants and wild produce from the forest.

== Geography ==
Palnadu district is bordered by NTR district on north, Bapatla district on south east, Prakasam district and Markapuram, on south west and Guntur district on east. It is also surrounded by Suryapet district and Nalgonda district in Telangana state at west.

== Land utilisation ==
The total geographical area of the district is 730,123 hectares (7,301.23 km^{2}) and 150,759 ha (1,507.59 km^{2}) is covered by forest. The net area sown is 315,650 ha (3,156.5 km^{2}). The total cropped area in the district is 347,114 ha (3,471.14 km^{2}). The area sown more than once during the year is 31,464 ha (314.64 km^{2}).

== Natural resources ==
The district is rich in mineral resources. The principal minerals available are limestone, lime, Napa slabs, copper and lead. Limestone is being utilised by the cement factories of Macherla. There are copper mines at Agnigundala of Ipur Mandal.

== Climate ==
The normal rainfall of the district is 775.3 mm (30.5 in) The climate is generally warm in summer and the heat is very severe in Rentachintala Mandal, where the maximum temperature in the state is recorded. Summer (March to June): the summer months are hot and dry, with temperatures often reaching high levels. This period is characterized by high temperatures and low rainfall. Monsoon (July to September): the monsoon season brings rainfall to the region. During this period, the district receives the majority of its annual precipitation. The monsoon rains are essential for agriculture and overall water supply. Post-monsoon/winter (October to February): after the monsoon season, the region experiences a post-monsoon period, followed by relatively cooler months during winter. The temperatures are milder during this time.

== Demographics ==
Religions in Palnadu district based on 2011 census data
Religion	Percent
Hinduism	86.73%
Islam	11.30%
Christianity	1.59%
Other or not stated	0.38%
Distribution of religions

The district had a population of 20,41,723, of which 458,551 (22.46%) lived in urban areas based on 2011 census data. Palnadu district has a sex ratio of 994 females per 1000 males. Scheduled Castes and Scheduled Tribes made up 3,75,554 (18.39%) and 1,42,944 (7.00%) of the population respectively. 87.12% of the population spoke Telugu, 9.90% Urdu and 2.41% Lambadi as their first language.

Languages of Palnadu district based on 2011 census data
1. Telugu (87.1%)
2. Urdu (9.90%)
3. Lambadi (2.41%)
4. Others (0.57%)

== Politics ==
The district is part of Narasaraopet (Lok Sabha constituency). There are seven assembly constituencies.

#	Name	District	Members	Party
85	Pedakurapadu	Palnadu	Bhashyam Praveen	Telugu Desam Party
96	Chilakaluripeta	Palnadu	Prathipati Pulla Rao	Telugu Desam Party
97	Narasaraopeta	Palnadu	Dr. Chadalavada Aravinda Babu	Telugu Desam Party
98	Sattenapalle	Palnadu	Kanna Lakshminarayana	Telugu Desam Party
99	Vinukonda	Palnadu	G. V. Anjaneyulu	Telugu Desam Party
100	Gurajala	Palnadu	Yarapathineni Srinivasa Rao	Telugu Desam Party
101	Macherla	Palnadu	Julakanti Brahmananda Reddy	Telugu Desam Party

== Administrative divisions ==
Mandals of Palnadu district (Overpass-turbo)

The district is divided into 3 revenue divisions: Gurazala, Narasaraopet and Sattenapalle, which are further subdivided into a total of 28 mandals.

=== Mandals ===
The list of 28 mandals in Palnadu district, divided into 3 revenue divisions, is given below.

1. Gurazala revenue division
  1. Dachepalle
  2. Durgi
  3. Gurazala
  4. Karempudi
  5. Machavaram
  6. Macherla
  7. Piduguralla
  8. Rentachintala
  9. Veldurthi
2. Narasaraopet revenue division
  1. Bollapalle
  2. Chilakaluripeta
  3. Edlapadu
  4. Ipur
  5. Nadendla
  6. Narasaraopet
  7. Nuzendla
  8. Rompicherla
  9. Savalyapuram
  10. Vinukonda
3. Sattenapalli revenue division
  1. Amaravathi
  2. Atchampet
  3. Bellamkonda
  4. Krosuru
  5. Muppalla
  6. Nekarikallu
  7. Pedakurapadu
  8. Rajupalem
  9. Sattenapalli

== Cities and towns ==
List of towns in Palnadu District
City	Civic status of town	revenue division	population
Narasaraopet	Municipality Grade - 1	Narasaraopet	117,489
Chilakaluripet	Municipality Grade - 1	Narasaraopet	101,398
Piduguralla	Municipality Grade - 2	Gurazala	63,103
Vinukonda	Municipality Grade - 2	Narasaraopet	62,550
Macherla	Municipality Grade - 2	Gurazala	57,290
Sattenapalle	Municipality Grade - 2	Sattenapalle	56,721
Dachepalle	Municipality Grade - 2	Gurazala	36,280
Gurazala	Municipality Grade - 2	Gurazala	30,464

== Tourist attractions ==
Palnadu district tourist attractions (After zooming, move the cursor over icons for more details)

- Kotappakonda
- Ethipothala Falls
- Kondaveedu Fort

== Notable people ==
- Palanati Brahmanaidu, Palnadu Kingdom
- Nayakuralu Nagamma, Palnadu Kingdom
- Kaneganti Hanumanthu, freedom fighter
- Gurram Jashuva, poet
- Kasu Brahmananda Reddy, 3rd Chief Minister of United Andhra Pradesh & 11th Union Minister of Home Affairs and served as Governor of Maharashtra and Other States
- Bhavanam Venkatarami Reddy, 8th Chief Minister of United Andhra Pradesh
- Kodela Siva Prasada Rao, 1st Speaker of Andhra pradesh Legislative Assembly and former home minister
- Vavilala Gopalakrishnayya, journalist and he was elected to the assembly
- Kasu Venkata Krishna Reddy, Former Cabinet Minister of United Andhra Pradesh
- Brahmanandam Kanneganti, Indian actor, popular telugu cinema comedian
