= Basava Puraskara =

- Civilian award
- Awarded for: Awarded for contributions towards social reform and social change
- Sponsored by: Government of Karnataka
- Reward: ₹10 lakh (US$11,000)
- First award: 2000
- Final award: 2021

Highlights
- First winner: Saraswathi Gora
- Last winner: Anand Teltumbde

Basava Puraskara is an award conferred by the Government of Karnataka to recognize contributions in the fields of literature, social justice, and harmony. It is named after Basava, a 12th-century philosopher and Lingayat social reformer.

== Recipients ==
Year	Recipient	Notes	Ref.
2000	Saraswathi Gora	Social worker, co-founder of the Atheist Centre	
2001	H. Narasimhaiah	Independence activist, physicist	
2002	Puttaraj Gawai	Social worker, musician	
2003	S. G. Susheelamma	Social worker, President of Sumangali Seva Ashram	
2005	L. Basavaraju	Professor, writer	
2006	A. P. J. Abdul Kalam	Scientist, former President of India	
2007	Shivakumara Swami	Pontiff of the Siddaganga Matha, founder of the Sri Siddaganga Education Society	
2008	Vijaya Mahantappa Swami	Pontiff of Chittaragi Sri Vijaya Mahantheshwara Matha, Ilkal	
2009	Siddhalinga Mahaswami	Pontiff of Tontadarya Matha, Gadag	
2010	Javare Gowda	Writer, educationist	
2011	Ramzan Darga	Writer	
2012	U. R. Ananthamurthy	Writer, activist	
2013	M. M. Kalburgi	Scholar, epigraphist	
2014	Veerabhadra Chennamalla Swami	Pontiff of the Nidumamidi Matha, Kolar	
2015	Go. Ru. Channabasappa	Writer, folk scholar	
2016	Sindhutai Sapkal	Social worker	
2017	Patil Puttappa	Writer, journalist	
2018	H. S. Doreswamy	Independence activist, social worker, journalist	
2019	Chandrashekhar Patil	Writer, playwright	
2021	Basavaliga Pattaddevaru	Seer	
2022	N.G. Mahadevappa	Professor	
2023	Anand Teltumbde	Scholar, activist	
