= Hemalatha Lavanam =

Indian social worker

- Born: Hemalatha; 26 February 1932; Vinukonda in Madras Presidency of British India
- Died: 19 March 2008 (aged 76); Vijayawada, Andhra Pradesh, India
- Occupations: Woman empowerment, Feminist Thinker, Educator, Activist
- Spouse: Lavanam (m. 1960)
- Father: Gurram Joshua
- Relatives: Goparaju Ramachandra Rao (father-in-law)

Hemalatha Lavanam (26 February 1932 – 19 March 2008) was an Indian social reformer, writer, and atheist who protested against untouchability and the caste system. She was also a co-founder of 'Samskar' with her husband, Lavanam.

== Early life ==
Hemalatha was born on 26 February 1932 at Vinukonda in Madras Presidency of British India, now in the Guntur district of Andhra Pradesh, India. She was the daughter of Telugu poet Gurram Joshua and Maryamma.

== Personal life ==
She married Lavanam in 1960 and became the daughter-in-law of social reformer Goparaju Ramachandra Rao and Saraswathi Gora, who were atheist social reformers and founders of the Atheist Centre in Vijayawada.

=== Reformation of denotified tribes ===
Through Samskar, Lavanam and Hemlatha took part in historical surrenders of dacoits in Chambal Valley to Vinobha Bhave. Jaya Prakash Narayan inspired the couple to work on criminal rehabilitation. Hemlatha, Lavanam and volunteers from atheist centre participated actively in criminal reformation and rehabilitation in 1974 in the areas of erstwhile criminal settlements Sitanagaram, Stuartpuram, Kawali, and Kapparallathippa in Andhra Pradesh. They devoted their time to bring change in the mindset of criminal tribal shelter helped to provide alternative livelihood to criminal rehabilitated families. Hemalatha and Lavanam demanded government of Andhra Pradesh to abolish settlements. Due to their efforts, the state government took a step in abolishing the managements and declaring them as free colonies in 1976. They visited the prisoners of Stuartpuram and kept constant contact through letters. The families of settlers visited Atheist center for advice. This contact changed some hardened criminals. They motivated the criminals to change from crime culture.

=== Work on Jogini ===
Hemalatha and Lavanam worked on upliftment and eradication of Joginis in Nizamabad district through Samskar. Her work made the Chief Minister of Andhra Pradesh N. T. Rama Rao Government enact legislation in 1988 to eradicate the Jogini system, Kumud Ben Joshi, C. Rangarajan as Governor of Andhra pradesh oversaw the marriages for joginis in Rajbhavan, Hyderabad. Samskar founded Chelli Nilyam Sister's Home in Varni of Nizamabad district.

=== Joshua Foundation ===
The Joshua Foundation instituted the Joshua Sahitya Puraskaram, a national award for poets of any language who had enriched Indian literature with human values. The rationale was to promote national integration and encourage purposeful poetry.

== Awards and recognition ==
Hemalatha received her doctorate in social work from Potti Sreeramulu Telugu University in Hyderabad. The National Book Trust of India published a biography of her in the National Biography series, written by Vakulabharanam Lalitha and Kompalli Sundar. K. Viyanna Rao, the Vice-Chancellor of Acharya Nagarjuna University, released the book and presented the first copy to her husband, Lavanam.

In 2003 she received a Red and White Bravery Award from Surjit Singh Barnala, the Governor of Andhra Pradesh, for her contribution to the field of social work.

== Death ==
Hemalatha suffered from ovarian cancer and died at the Atheist Centre, Vijayawada, on 19 March 2008. She was cremated without any religious rites.

== In popular culture ==
She was portrayed by Renu Desai in 2023 Telugu film Tiger Nageswara Rao.
