= Hikkal =

Hikkal Venkataramana Swamy Temple
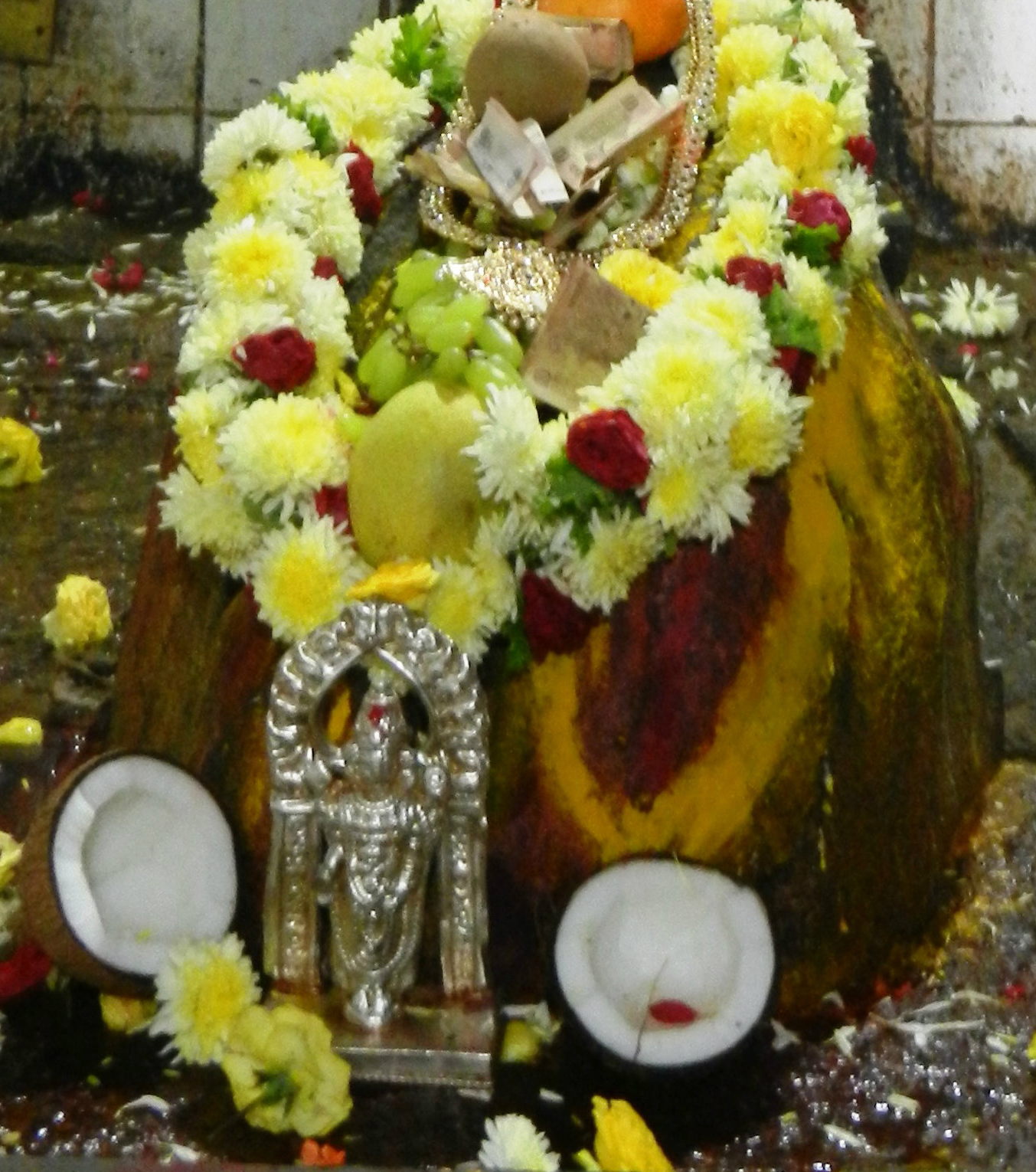

- Location in Karnataka

Religion
- Affiliation: Hinduism
- Deity: Venkataramana Swamy

Location
- Location: Tumkur
- State: Karnataka
- Country: India
- Interactive map of Hikkal Venkataramana Swamy Temple
- Coordinates: 13°19′49″N 77°14′44″E

Hikkal is a hill in Urdigere Taluk, Tumkur District, and Karnataka State, India. It is approximately 16 km from the district's main city of Tumkur, and 70 km away from the capital city Bangalore. The hill houses a temple of Lord Srinivasa in the form of a stone resembling a ripped ant hill; Idols of goddesses Sridevi and Bhudevi are also present. The nearby village is named after the hill Hikkal and the deity Srinivasa is called Hikkallappa. There is also an idol of Balaji, which was installed in 1999. It was presented by the Tirumala Tirupathi Devasthanam (TTD) of Andhra Pradesh which recognised this temple as one of the 108 sub-shrines of the original deity at Tirumala.

== Nature ==
Besides its ancient temple, Hikkal hill has forests with trekking paths and views. The hill is about 1,650 ft tall, and one needs to take a flight of steps flanked by thick bushes and large boulders to reach the summit.

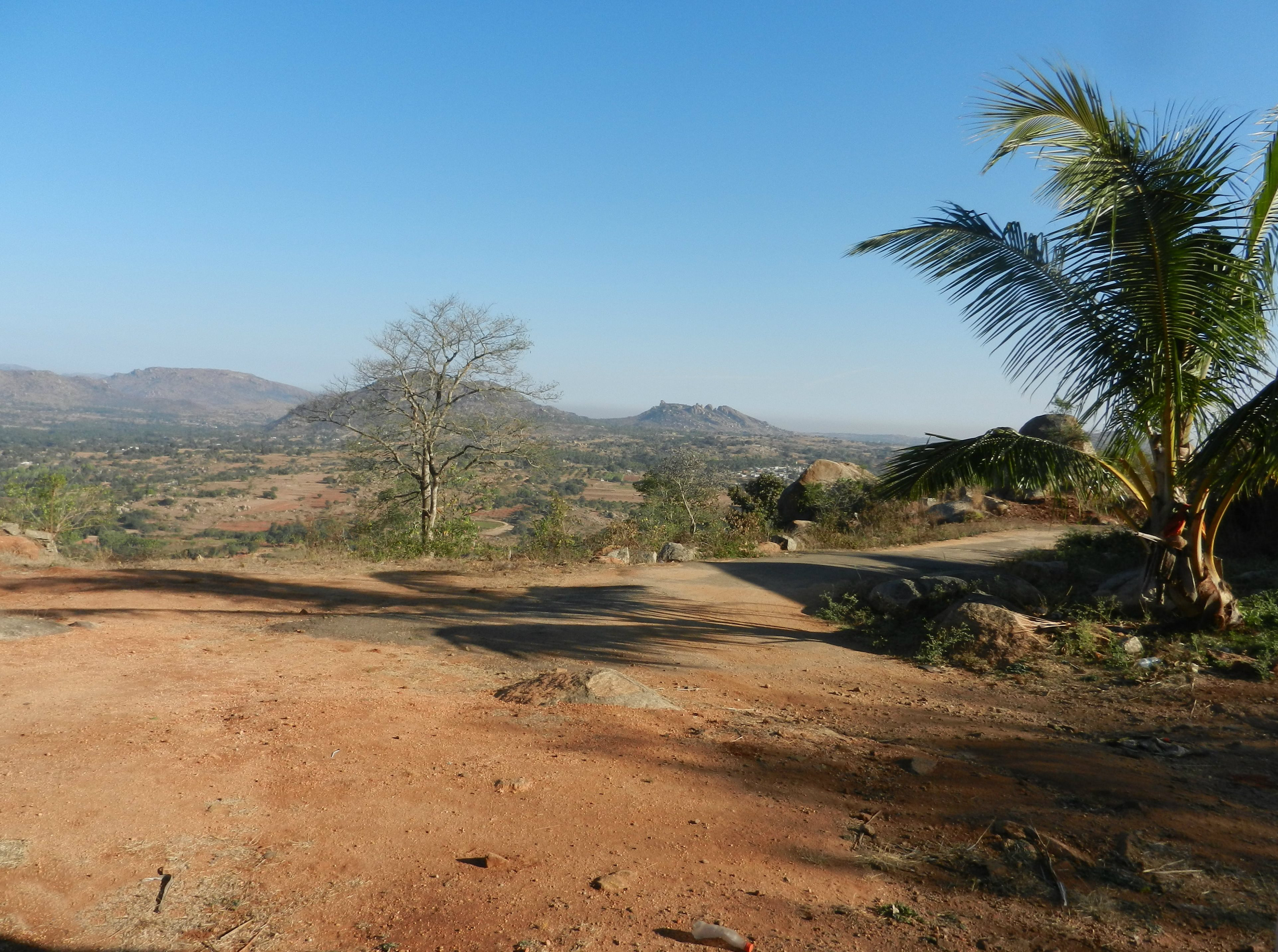
View from Hikkallappa Temple

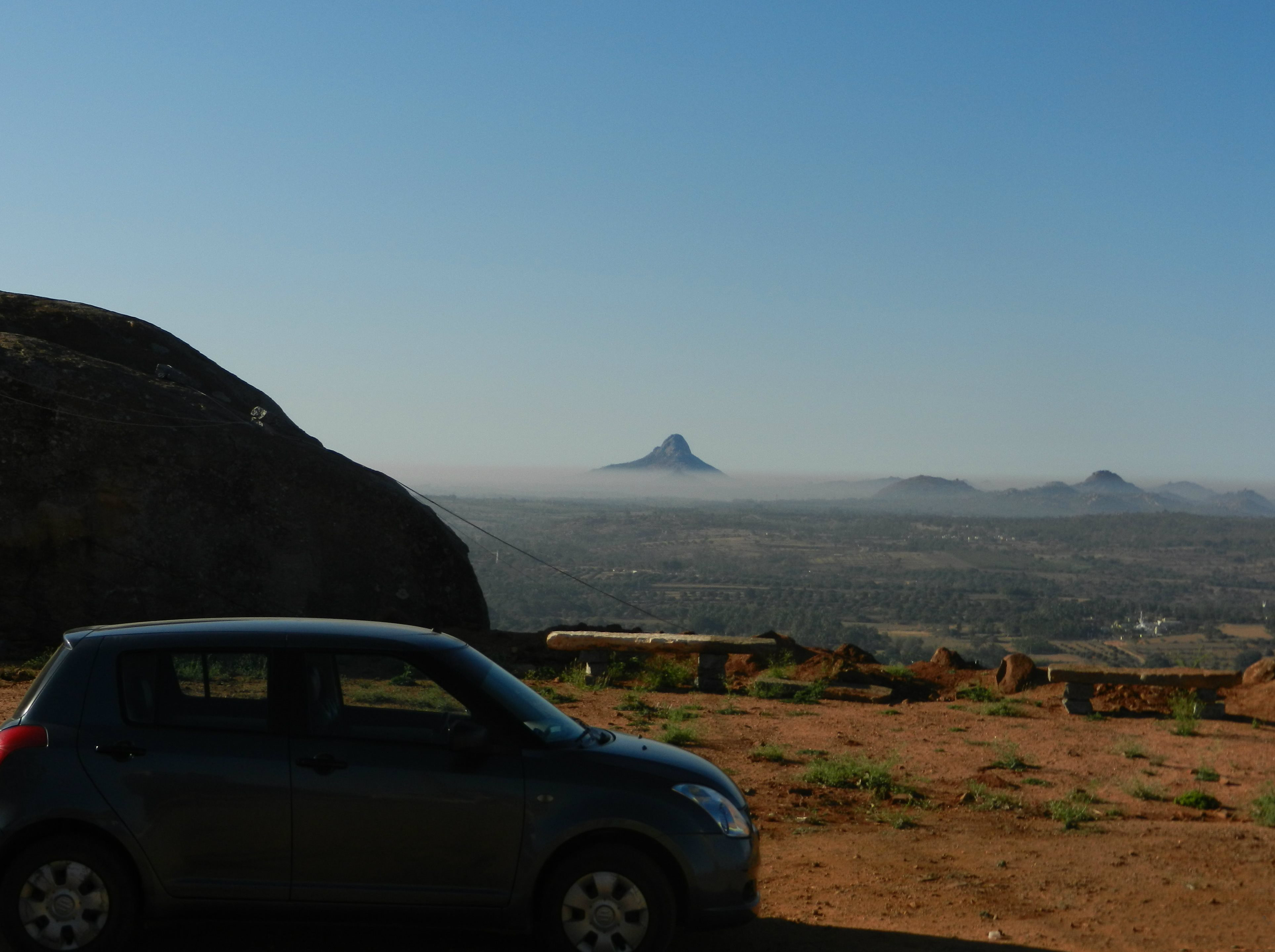
View from Hikkallappa Temple

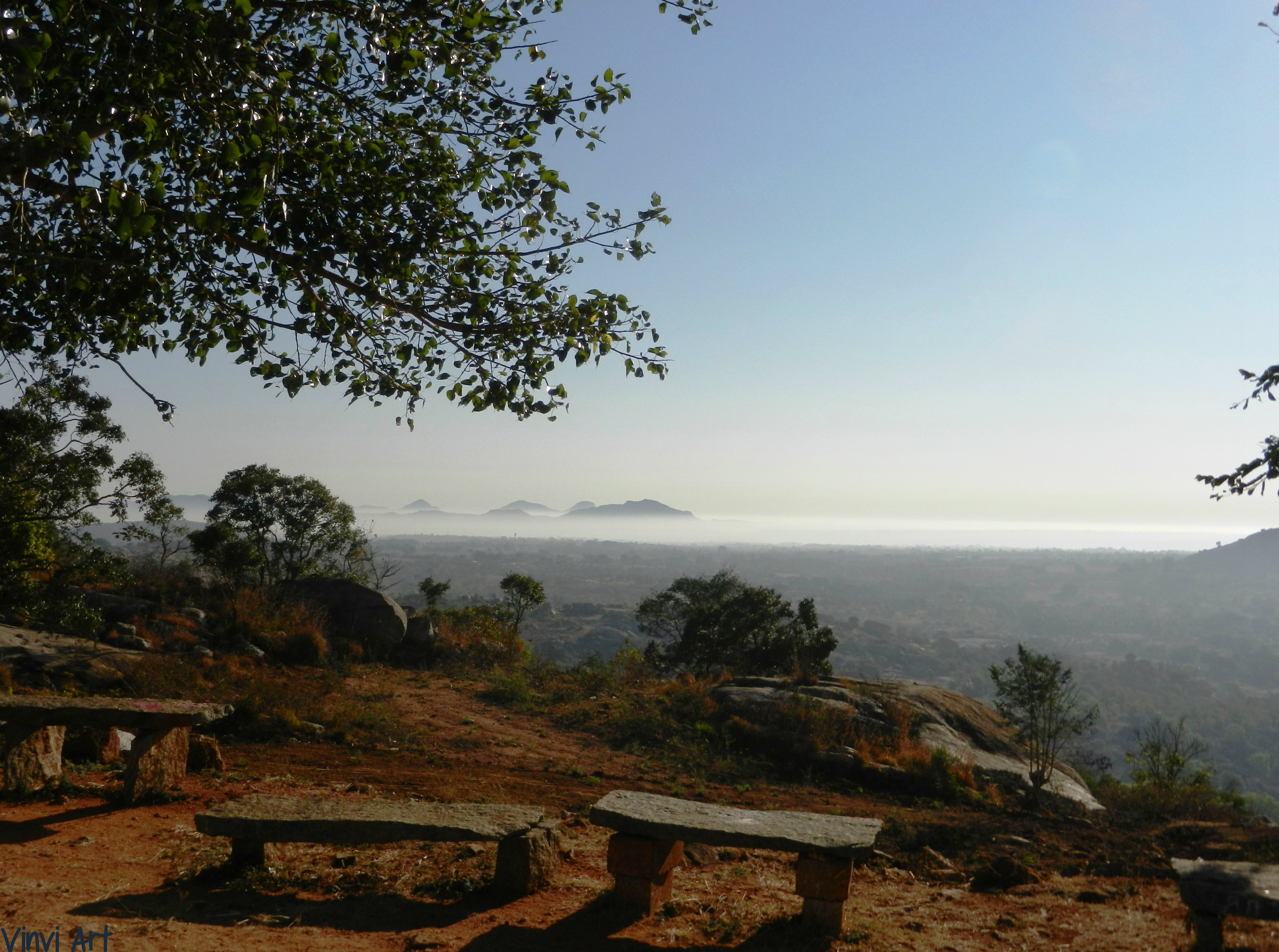
View from Hikkallappa Temple

== Holy pond ==
At the top of the hill is a small freshwater spring between two large boulders. It is observed that this pond is quite deep, and it is said that it has never dried up.

== Other sacred places around Hikkal ==
There are many famous temples in and around Hikkal. Some of the sacred places around Hikkal are Shivagange (18 km), Siddaganga Matha (16 km), Devarayanadurga Narasimha temple (8 km), Goravanahalli Mahalakshmi temple (25 km), Kyamenahalli Anjaneya Temple (30 km) which attract a large number of visitors.
