= Doreswamy =

Doreswamy is an Indian family name.

- Mysore V. Doreswamy Iyengar, 1920 – 1997, a Carnatic musician,
- Harohalli Srinivasaiah Doreswamy, born in 1918, an Indian Freedom Movement activist.
- Dr Mysore Doreswamy Madhusudan, an Indian wildlife biologist and ecologist.
