= Basavaraju =

Basavaraju or Basava Raju (Telugu: బసవరాజు) is a Telugu given name or surname. Notable persons with that name include:

- Basavaraju Venkata Padmanabha Rao (1931–2010), Indian Telugu actor, comedian, director and producer from Andhra Pradesh
- Basavaraju Saraiah, Indian politician from Telangana
- L. Basavaraju (1919–2012), Indian Kannada scholar and writer
