= Chennupati =

Chennupati (చెన్నుపాటి) is a Telugu surname and may refer to:

- Chennupati Vidya, an Indian politician and social worker
- Chennupati Jagadish, a Distinguished Professor of Physics at the Australian National University Research School of Physics and Engineering
