= Goparaju Ramachandra Rao =

Indian social activist (1902–1975)

Gora
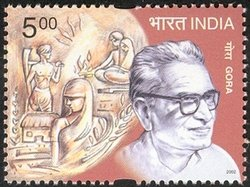
- Government of India issued commemorative postage stamp on Gora
- Born: Goparaju Ramachandra Rao; 15 November 1902; Chhatrapur, Odisha, British India
- Died: 26 July 1975 (aged 72); Vijayawada, Andhra Pradesh, India
- Other name: Gora
- Known for: Social reforms, atheist activism
- Spouse: Saraswathi Gora
- Children: (9) Lavanam; Chennupati Vidya; G. Samaram
- Relatives: Hemalatha Lavanam (daughter-in-law)

Goparaju Ramachandra Rao (15 November 1902 – 26 July 1975), popularly known as Gora, was an Indian social reformer, atheist activist and a participant in the Indian independence movement. He authored many books on atheism and proposed atheism as self-confidence. He propagated positive atheism by his articles, speeches, books and his social work. He is the founder of Atheist Centre along with his wife Saraswathi Gora and a few volunteers. Social reformer G. Lavanam, politician Chennupati Vidya, and physician G. Samaram are his children.

== Early days ==
Gora was born on 15 November 1902, into an orthodox Telugu Brahmin family in India. He pursued a botany degree, eventually earning his Master's in botany at Presidency College in Madras. He married Saraswathi Gora in 1922, when she was only 10. He taught botany for fifteen years at various institutes at Madurai, Coimbatore, Colombo and Kakinada.

== Life and work ==
Gora started his activism against superstition in the 1920s. He and his wife publicly viewed solar eclipses, as there was a superstitious belief that pregnant women should not do so. They stayed in haunted houses to dispel the myths about such places.

Gora used to run a monthly programme called "cosmopolitan dinners" every full moon night, where people of all castes and religions gathered together. Gora insisted on staying in a Harijan locality whenever he was invited to address a village. He also conducted several inter-caste and inter-religious marriages. A son and a daughter of his married spouses from untouchable castes.

In 1933, he was dismissed from the PR College in Kakinada for his atheist views. In 1939, he was dismissed from the Hindu College in Machilipatnam for the same reason.

=== Atheist Centre ===
After his dismissal in 1940 he and his wife founded the Atheist Centre in a small village called Mudunur in the Krishna district. The Atheist Centre was (and is) heavily involved in social reforms. On the eve of Independence in 1947, they moved the Atheist centre to Vijayawada. In 1941, he published his first book on atheism in Telugu, Atheism: There is no god (Telugu: Nasthikatvamu: Devudu ledu).

Throughout the 1940s, he worked in the Indian independence movement. In 1942, Gora along with his wife and eldest son were arrested during the Quit India Movement. Their 18-month son had to accompany his mother to the Royavellor jail.

Gora and Gandhi had several discussions, some of which have been recorded in the book An Atheist With Gandhi. When Gandhi asked him to differentiate between atheism and godlessness Gora replied,

Godlessness is negative. It merely denies the existence of god. Atheism is positive. It asserts the condition that results from the denial of god. Atheism bears a positive significance in the practice of life.

Gandhi supported Gora's anti-untouchability reform movement, and remarked that he wished Gora would succeed in producing a Tuskegee in India. Tuskegee in Alabama, United States, is an important site in Africa American history where Booker T. Washington established the Tuskegee University.

In 1952, he contested in the parliamentary elections to propagate his idea of party-less democracy. In 1967, he also contested in the assembly polls.

=== World Atheist Conference ===
Gora visited several nations in 1970 and 1974. He was in touch with the American atheist, Madalyn Murray O'Hair. On 5 October 1970, O'Hair mentioned Gora and his Atheist Center on her radio show. In 1970, when Gora stopped in the United States during his tour, he met O'Hair. They decided that a World Atheist Conference should be held every three years. Gora offered to host the first one in 1972. O'Hair was not able to attend as her visa was not approved in time. The first World Atheist Conference was held in 1972. After the event, Gora published a book in English called Positive Atheism.

=== Beef and Pork Party ===
Gora first organized Beef and Pork Friendship party in Vijayawada on 15 August 1972, the Silver Jubilee of Indian Independence. There was big commotion and opposition. True to his principles, Gora urged for voluntary participation. Puri Shankaracharya and some orthodox people violently opposed and threatened to disrupt the function. When the matter went up to the Prime Minister Indira Gandhi, the government reacted positively and provided police protection. Thousands of people gathered to witness the beef and pork party. Gora and Saraswathi Gora, who headed the programme, made it clear that it was meant to bring social cohesion. Participants were asked to sign in a register. Among the hundreds of gatherers, 138 people came forward and ate beef and pork together. They included atheists, and even orthodox Hindus, Muslims and Christians. When similar programme was held at Coimbatore, Periyar EV Ramaswami and Gora participated. In various places including Visakhapatnam, Gudivada and Suryapet, Beef and Pork programmes were held.

== Family ==
Gora had nine children. Gora got his eldest daughter, Manorama, married to Arjuna Rao in 1949.The marriage was held in Sevagram, in the presence of Jawaharlal Nehru. The marriage of his eldest son, Lavanam, with Hemalatha, the daughter of Gurram Jashuva, was also held in Sevagram In 1960. His eldest son Lavanam, daughter Mythri and another son Vijayam, continued to organise the World Atheist Conference. Mythri is the chairperson of Atheist Centre and Vijayam is the current executive director of the Atheist Centre. The physician G. Samaram is his son.

His daughter, Chennupati Vidya, is a social worker. She was elected to the Lok Sabha, of the Parliament of India, in 1980 and 1989.

== Political views and philosophy ==
Gora supported partyless democracy.

Gora was a Gandhian and believed in Sarvodaya (progress of all). He rejected historical materialism and considered Marxism a 'fatalist philosophy'.

He believed that atheism allows a person to surpass the barriers of castes and religions. It allows a person to understand that his/her actions are directed by free will and not Karma, fate or divine will. This in turn would allow Harijans to be liberated, as they would no longer believe that they are fated to be untouchable.

== Death ==
Gora died on 26 July 1975 in Vijayawada. His autobiography, completed a few days before his death, was published in 1976. The Atheist Centre continued under the guidance of Saraswathi Gora, until her death in 2006 on 19 August.

== Recognition ==
In 2002, India Post, the postal department of the Government of India, released a postage stamp of five rupee denomination commemorating Gora's birth centenary.

== See also ==
- Saraswathi Gora
- Lavanam Gora
- Abraham Kovoor
- Periyar E. V. Ramasamy

== Bibliography ==
- Atheism: There is No God (1941)
- An Atheist With Gandhi (1951, 3rd ed. 1971)
- Partyless Democracy (1961, 2nd ed. 1983)
- We Become Atheists (1975)
- Positive Atheism (1972, 2nd ed. 1978)
- Atheism: Questions and Answers (1980)
- The Need of Atheism (1980)
- I Learn (1980)
- People and Progress (1981)
- An Atheist Around The World (1987)
