= Saraswathi Gora =

Indian social activist (1912–2006)

- Born: 28 September 1912; India
- Died: 19 August 2006 (aged 93); Vijayawada, India
- Occupation: Social worker
- Known for: Co-founder of the Atheist Centre
- Spouse: Gora
- Children: 9, including Lavanam; Chennupati Vidya
- Relatives: Hemalatha Lavanam (daughter-in-law)
- Awards: Jamnalal Bajaj Award (1999)

Saraswathi Gora (28 September 1912 – 19 August 2006) was an Indian social activist who served as leader of the Atheist Centre for many years, campaigning against untouchability and the caste system.

== Biography ==
In the 1930s, Saraswathi championed and performed marriages of devadasis and of widows remarriages along with her husband Gora. After learning about their efforts to abolish untouchability and the caste system, and towards social reform, they were invited to Mahatma Gandhi's ashram in Sevagram in 1944, where they stayed for two weeks.

Along with her husband, Saraswathi established the Atheist Center in 1940. Their goal was to promote human values based on atheism, rationalism and Gandhism.

A political activist of India's freedom movement, she was imprisoned during the Quit India movement. She went to jail carrying her two-and-half-year old son, Niyanta.

== Personal life ==
Her autobiography My Life With Gora was published (in Telugu) in 2012. She died of lung infection on 19 August 2006 at Vijayawada.

== Awards and recognition ==
In 2000, she was selected for the Basava Puraskar, conferred by the Karnataka Government. She is also the recipient of the G. D. Birla International Award for Humanism; the Jamnalal Bajaj Award (1999); the Janaki Devi Bajaj Award; and the Potti Sriramulu Telugu University Award.
