= Lavanam =

Indian politician (1930–2015)

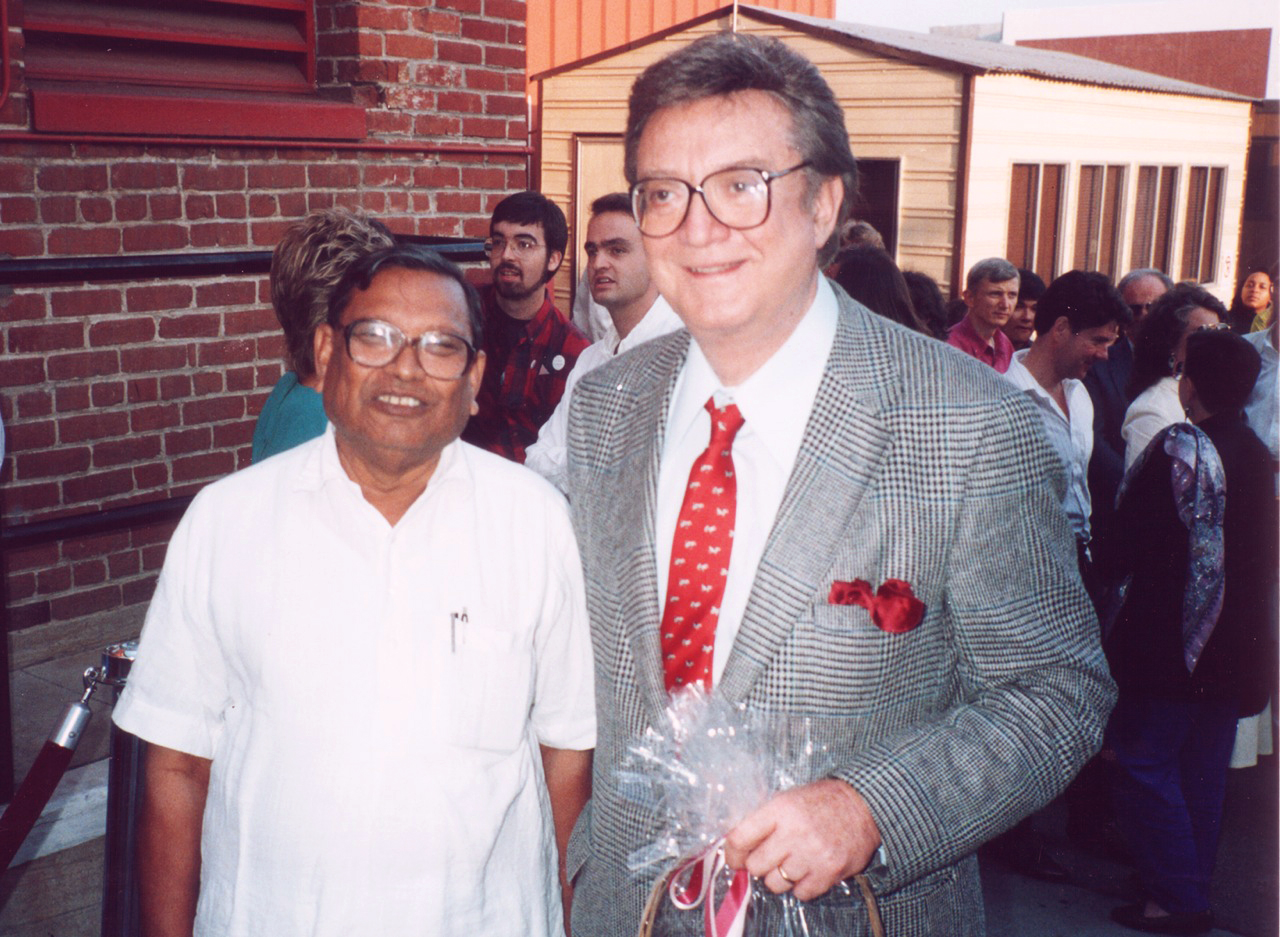
- Lavanam and Steve Allen in Los Angeles
- Born: Goparaju Ramachandra Lavanam; 10 October 1930; India
- Died: 14 August 2015 (aged 84); Vijayawada, Andhra Pradesh, India
- Other names: G. Lavanam, Gora Lavanam
- Occupation: Social reformer
- Known for: Founder of atheist centre, Samskar
- Spouse(s): Hemalatha Lavanam (1960–2008; her death)
- Parent(s): Goparaju Ramachandra Rao (father); Saraswathi Gora (mother)
- Relatives: G. Samaram (brother); Chennupati Vidya (sister); Gurram Joshua (father-in-law)

Goparaju Ramachandra Lavanam (10 October 1930 – 14 August 2015), known popularly as G. Lavanam or Lavanam, was an Indian social reformer and Gandhian. He worked to remove untouchability in Indian society. He was an atheist and co-founded the Samskar institution with his wife Hemalatha Lavanam. Chennupati Vidya and G. Samaram are his siblings.

== Life ==
He was born to atheist leader Goparaju Ramachandra Rao "Gora" and Saraswathi Gora on 10 October 1930. He began social work at the age of 12 under the guidance of his father. He was the interpreter of Vinoba Bhave during his land reform movement in Andhra Pradesh and parts of Orissa. He married outside his caste to Hemalatha Lavanam, daughter of noted poet Gurram Joshua, in 1960 at Sevagram.

After the 1977 Andhra Pradesh cyclone hit Diviseema, Lavanam helped in the rehabilitation work.

He and his wife worked to reform the Jogini system prevalent in Andhra Pradesh through their organisation, Samskar. His wife, a well known atheist and social reformer, died on 19 March 2008 at the age of 75. She was suffering from ovarian cancer. Lavanam died on 14 August 2015, due to multiple organ failure at a hospital in Vijayawada, Andhra Pradesh.

== Views and opinions ==
Lavanam supported the formation of the new state Telangana. According to him, there were few cultural and social ties between Telangana and Andhra. He wrote a petition to the Andhra Pradesh High Court for the inclusion of an atheist option in the Indian census.

== Awards ==
- 1991: Atheist of the Decade Award from Atheists United in Los Angeles for promoting international atheism 1980 to 1990.
- 2009: Jamnalal Bajaj Award for resettling and providing employment opportunities to the members of Denotified Tribes.
- 2011: Lifetime Achievement Award from the International Service Society, which is affiliated with the Vaishnava Center for Enlightenment, for his contribution to world peace and service to humanity.
- 2015: International Humanist Award from Probe Resource Center for Journalist in Hyderabad, for his contribution to promote human rights and social reforms.

== Books ==
- Gandhi as We Have Known Him, with Mark Lindley (National Gandhi Museum, New Delhi, 2005; 2nd edition, 2009)
