= Chennupati Vidya =

Indian politician (1934–2018)

Member of Parliament, Lok Sabha
- In office 1989 - 1991
- Preceded by: Vadde Sobhanadreeswara Rao
- Succeeded by: Vadde Sobhanadreeswara Rao
- Constituency: Vijayawada
- In office 1980 - 1984
- Preceded by: Godey Murahari
- Succeeded by: Vadde Sobhanadreeswara Rao
- Constituency: Vijayawada

Personal details
- Born: 5 June 1934 Vizianagaram, British India
- Died: 18 August 2018 (aged 84) Vijayawada, India
- Party: Indian National Congress
- Spouse: Chennupati Seshagiri Rao
- Relations: G. Samaram (brother); G. Lavanam (brother); Hemalatha Lavanam (sister-in-law)
- Children: 1 son, 3 daughters
- Parent(s): Gora (father); Saraswathi Gora (mother)
- Awards: Jamnalal Bajaj Award (2014)

Chennupati Vidya (5 June 1934 – 18 August 2018) was an Indian politician and social worker. She was twice elected to the Lok Sabha in 1980 and 1989 from Vijayawada constituency on an Indian National Congress ticket. G. Lavanam and G. Samaram are her brothers.

== Biography ==
She was the daughter of famous atheist Goparaju Ramachandra Rao, better known as Gora, and of his wife Saraswathi. She was born in Vizianagram in today's Andhra Pradesh on 5 June 1934 and was educated at Andhra University, Visakhapatnam. In 1950, she married Chennupati Seshagiri Rao (1921–2008). She had one son and three daughters.

From 1969 she was the president of the Vasavya Mahila Mandali, an NGO dedicated to the empowerment of women and children in Andhra Pradesh.

She was elected to the 7th Lok Sabha in 1980 from Vijayawada constituency on an Indian National Congress ticket. She was reelected in 1989 to the 9th Lok Sabha from the same constituency.

She was President of Andhra Pradesh Kho-kho Association and associated with Rotary Movement and Lions Club.

She died in Vijayawada on 18 August 2018.

== Awards and recognition ==
- 2014: Jamnalal Bajaj Award under "Development and welfare of women and children" category.
- Aadarsa Manya Mahila (Ideal Woman) in the Telugu Book of Record.
