= Shivakumara Swami =

Indian humanitarian, spiritual leader and educator (1907–2019)

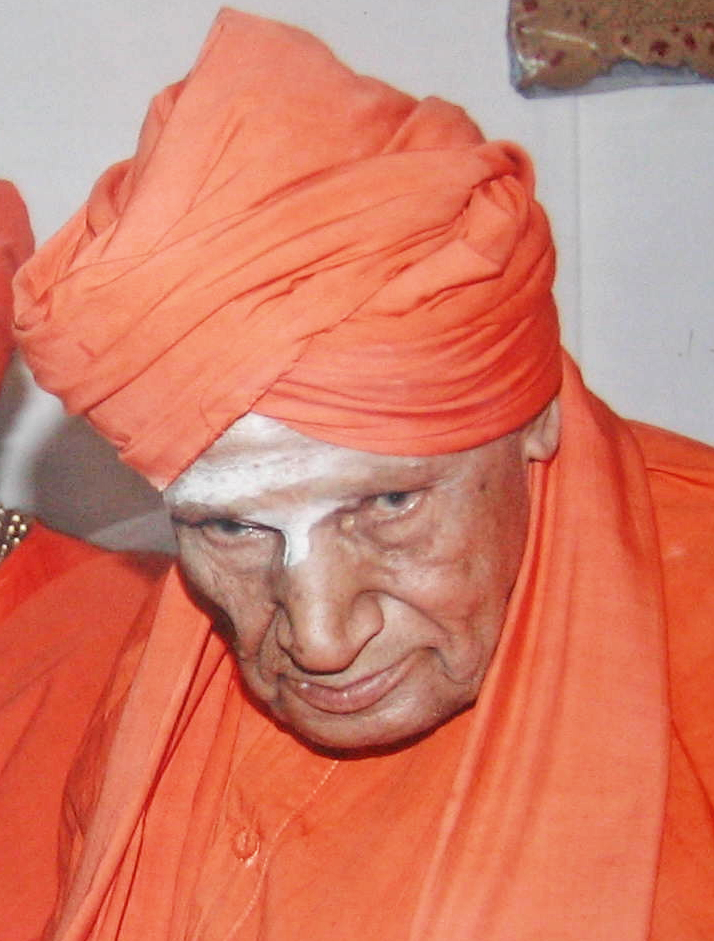
- Shivakumara Swami on 12 June 2007, aged 100
- Born: Shivanna; 1 April 1907; Veerapura, Magadi,Ramanagara district,Kingdom of Mysore
- Died: 21 January 2019 (aged 111); Tumkur, Karnataka, India
- Education: Doctor of Literature (honorary, 1965)
- Occupations: Humanitarian; spiritual leader; educator; head of Siddaganga Matha
- Years active: 1930–2019
- Organization: Siddaganga Education Society
- Awards: Padma Bhushan (2015); Karnataka Ratna (2007)

Shivakumara Swami (born Shivanna; 1 April 1907 – 21 January 2019) was an Indian humanitarian, spiritual leader, educator and supercentenarian. He was a Hindu Veerashaiva (Lingayatism ) religious figure. Swami joined the Siddaganga Matha in 1930 and became head seer in 1941. Described as the most esteemed adherent of Lingayatism (Veerashaivism), he was referred to as Nadedaaduva Devaru (walking God) in the state. In 2015, Dr Shivakumara Swamiji was awarded by the government of India the Padma Bhushan, India's third highest civilian award.

== Early life ==
Shivanna was born on 1 April 1907 in Veerapura, a village near Magadi in the former Kingdom of Mysore (in present-day Ramanagara district of Karnataka state) in a Vokkaliga family and was initiated into Viraktashram order of Veerashaiva-Lingayata at the age of 23. He was the youngest of thirteen children of Gangamma and Patel Honnappa. Having been devoted followers of the deities Gangadhareshwara and Honnadevi, Shivanna's parents took him to the shrines in Shivagange, and other religious centres around Veerapura. His mother Gangamma died when he was eight.

Shivanna completed his elementary education in a rural Anglo-vernacular school in Nagavalli, a village in the present-day Tumkur district. He graduated in 1926. He was also briefly a resident-student at the Siddaganga Matha during this time. He enrolled in Central College of Bangalore to study in arts with physics and mathematics as optional subjects. Shivanna was proficient in the Kannada, Sanskrit and English languages.

Shivanna ended his attendance at college before earning a bachelor's degree because he had been named successor to Uddana Shivayogi Swami as head of the Siddaganga Matha. Shivanna's friend and the heir to head the Matha, Sri Marularadhya, died on 16 January 1930. The incumbent chief Shivayogi Swami chose Shivanna to take Sri Marularadhya's place as heir. Upon formal initiation, Shivanna, renamed Shivakumara, entered the viraktashram (the monks' order) on 3 March 1930. He assumed the pontifical name Shivakumara Swami. Following Shivayogi Swami's death on 11 January 1941, Shivanna assumed charge of the Matha.

== Social work ==
The Swami founded a total of 132 institutions for education and training, which range from a nursery school to colleges for engineering, science, arts and management as well as vocational training. He established educational institutions which teach traditional Sanskrit as well as modern science and technology. In 1963 he founded the Sri Siddaganga Education Society. The Swami's gurukula houses more than 10,000 children from ages five to sixteen years. The houses are open to children from all religions, castes, and creeds who are provided free food, education, and shelter (Trividha Daasoha). Pilgrims and visitors to the mutt also receive free meals. Under the Swami's guidance, an annual agricultural fair was held for the benefit of the local population.

Swami was widely respected for his philanthropic work. The Government of Karnataka announced the institution of Shivakumara Swamiji Prashasti from 2007, the centennial birth anniversary of Swamiji. A. P. J. Abdul Kalam, the former President of India, visited him at Tumkur and praised Swami's humanitarian work and initiatives in education. Like other Lingayats, Swami adhered to a strict vegetarian diet.

== Illness and death ==
Starting in 2016, Swami was repeatedly hospitalised in Bangalore for various infections. In January 2019, he was hospitalised again and placed on life support, later moving back to Siddaganga Matha at his own request. On 21 January, it was reported that he was in a critical condition, and he died later that morning. The Government of Karnataka declared a public holiday on 22 January as part of a three-day state mourning period.

== Awards and recognitions ==
Sri Shivakumara Swami statue in Konanakunte, Benglauru (2026)

In recognition of his humanitarian work, Karnatak University awarded the Swami an honorary Doctor of Literature in 1965. On his centenary in 2007, the Government of Karnataka awarded Swami the Karnataka Ratna, the highest civilian award of the state. In 2015 the Government of India awarded him the Padma Bhushan.

In 2017, the Government of Karnataka and his followers sought Bharat Ratna for him for his social service.
