= H. S. Doreswamy =

Indian freedom fighter, activist, and journalist (1918–2021)

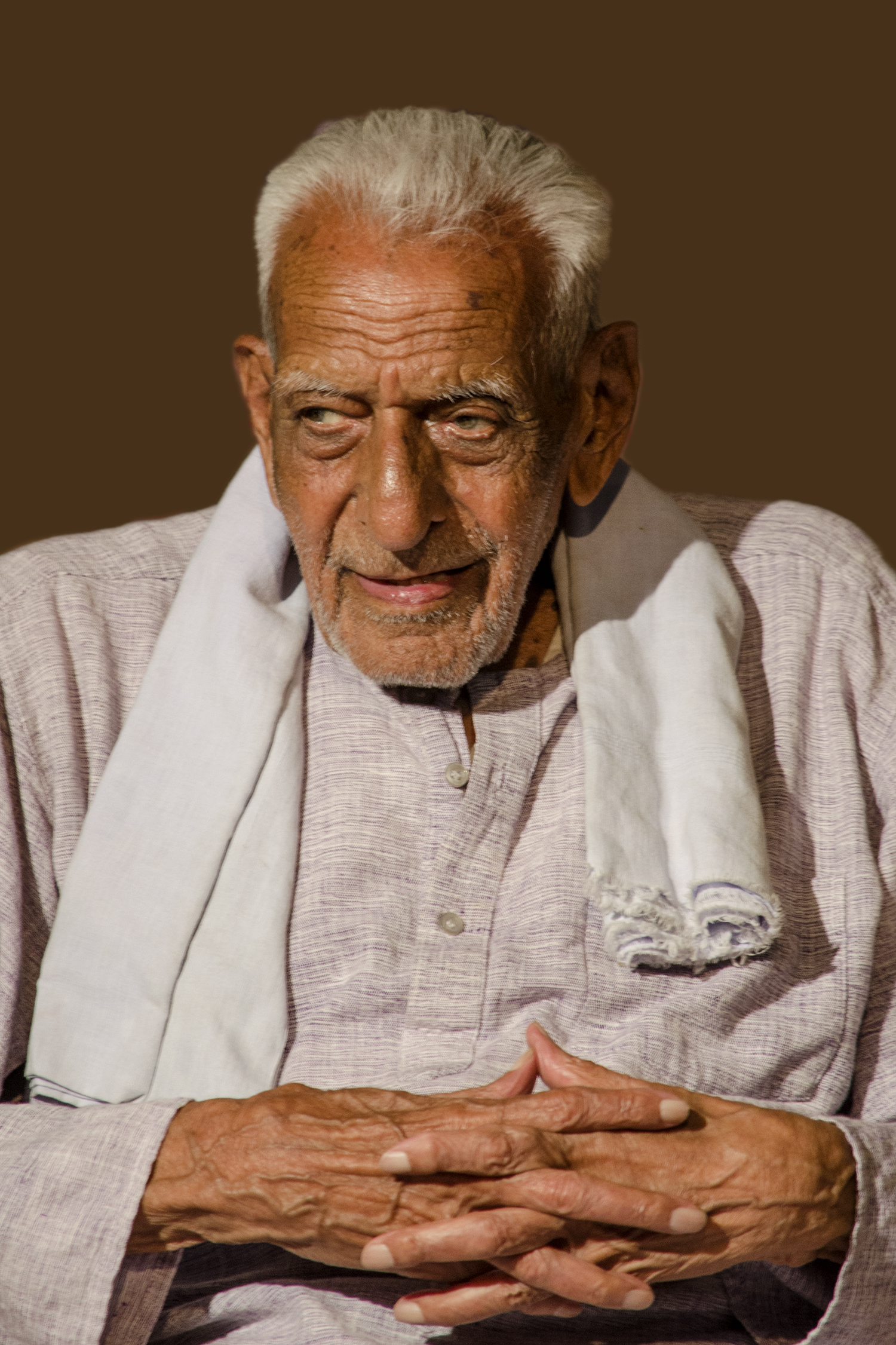
- Doreswamy in September 2014
- Born: Harohalli Srinivasaiah Doreswamy; 10 April 1918; Harohalli, Kingdom of Mysore, British Raj
- Died: 26 May 2021 (aged 103); Bengaluru, Karnataka, India
- Education: Central College, Bangalore (B.Sc.)
- Known for: Freedom fighter
- Movement: Indian independence movement
- Spouse: Lalithamma (m. 1950–2019)
- Children: 2
- Awards: Basava Puraskara; Ramnath Goenka Excellence in Journalism Awards

Harohalli Srinivasaiah Doreswamy (10 April 1918 – 26 May 2021) was an Indian journalist and activist. He was a member of the Indian independence movement, and became a centenarian in April 2018. He ran the publication house of Sahitya Mandira and the Indian nationalist newspaper Pauravani during the British Raj and the period afterwards. The historian Ramachandra Guha describes him as the "conscience of the state (Karnataka)" due to his activism.

== Early life and education ==
Doreswamy was born in the village of Harohalli, in the erstwhile Kingdom of Mysore, a princely state of the British Indian Empire. He was raised by his grandfather Shamanna after his father died when he was five years old. He had an elder brother Seetharam who would later become the mayor of Bangalore in independent India. His grandfather was a shanubhog (village accountant) and a nominated member of the representative assembly. Doreswamy completed his primary education in his village and then went to Bangalore to complete his higher education. He was enrolled in the Government Intermediate College of Bangalore for his higher secondary education and later graduated with a Bachelor of Science degree from the Central College of Bangalore.

== Independence movement ==
After finishing his education in June 1942, he began teaching mathematics and physics at a high school in Bangalore. In August, when the Quit India Movement had begun, he became involved in setting up small scale time bombs in postboxes and record rooms to burn official documents as a method adopted to disrupt the functioning of the British Raj. He along with some associates also became involved in organising protests and general strikes in Mysore State. He collaborated with N.D. Shankar, a freedom fighter and communist union leader in organising a 14 day general strike at three textile mills, namely Raja, Minerva and Binny Mills, which saw the participation of 8,000 workers. Subsequently, there were strikes in various factories and mills across the region over the following 3 to 30 days. He also formed associations with A.G. Ramachandra Rao and Sardar Venkataramaiah who were underground at the time.

In 1943, one of his bomb suppliers, namely Ramachandra got caught by the police with time bombs in his possession who named Doreswamy as a contact. Following which, he was arrested and put under indefinite detention in Bangalore Central Jail (Freedom Park). He stated that during his detention he contacted his supplier and encouraged him to confess to being the one responsible for bombing postboxes so that one of them could be released and continue the operation. Despite the efforts, the authorities retained him in custody and denied him an opportunity for a trial. The jail at the time was being used to hold political prisoners including his brother, H.S. Seetharam. He described the prison to have been converted into a place of learning where he studied and played volleyball with other prisoners. He learned to speak Tamil and Hindi from other independence movement activists during this time. On 26 January 1944, the prisoners including him were beaten up by the guards, confined in their rooms and denied food for celebrating the declaration of Purna Swaraj. He was later released in the summer of 1944 after spending 14 months in jail at a time when the government was releasing political prisoners.

After his release from prison, Doreswamy established a publication house and book store by the name of Sahitya Mandira in Bangalore. He later moved to Mysore on the request of a dying friend to take over the operation of his newspaper, Pauravani which was running at a loss at the time. In 1947, during the Political integration of India, the Maharaja of Mysore was reluctant to accede to the Indian Union, which resulted in the "Mysore Chalo" movement to pressurize the maharaja into acceding. Due to the movement, congress leaders were arrested and press freedom was curbed by the Kingdom of Mysore. Doreswamy among other journalists are noted to have continued publishing their newspapers from undisclosed locations. The Pauravani, which was operating as an Indian nationalist newspaper was being published from the city of Hindupur, Madras State situated at the border of the Kingdom of Mysore. In an interview, Doreswamy stated that a teacher named Sheshagiri assisted him in circulating the newspaper at the time. He also stated that literary figures like R.K. Narayan and K.S. Narasimhaswamy were frequent visitors at his book store during and after the independence movement.

== Post-independence activities ==
During the 1950s, Doreswamy participated in the Bhoodan movement and the movement for the Unification of Karnataka. He was jailed for four months in 1975 after he sent a letter to Indira Gandhi threatening to launch an agitation against her for "acting like a dictator" during the Emergency in India. He was active during the JP Movement against the Emergency rule. During the 1980s, he was involved in various movements for the rights of farmers and other marginalised communities, and later became active in the India Against Corruption movement.

In later years, Doreswamy was involved in a number of agitations and committees working against the encroachment of water bodies and dumping of garbage near impoverished areas in and outside Bangalore. The Hindu credits his activism in Bangalore with having led to the construction of six new waste processing plants in the city in 2014. In October 2014, he led an anti-encroachment protest in Bangalore with the support of A. T. Ramaswamy and the Aam Aadmi Party, demanding the implementation of Land Grabbing Prohibition Act, 2007 from the state government. The protest came to an end after 38 days with the government yielding to the demands. In 2016, he launched a 24/7 dharna (picketing) outside the Suvarna Vidhana Soudha when sessions were being held in the legislative assembly in Belgaum demanding the grant of land to the landless in the state which forced the Chief minister, Siddaramaiah to personally give him assurances that the promise will be kept. He was also involved in agitations against the eviction of adivasis from their tribal lands in Kodagu district.

Doreswamy took active participation in the 2019–2020 protests in India. According to him, the country's democracy was being threatened by the government of Narendra Modi and Amit Shah and that the situation created by them is becoming similar to that created by the British Raj. In response, the Bharatiya Janata Party in Karnataka had attacked him by alleging that he was a Pakistani agent and an "anti national". The party justified the attacks stating that he had done the unthinkable by criticising the prime minister, Narendra Modi.

== Personal life ==
In 1950, Doreswamy married Lalithamma, who was 19 years of age at the time, and with whom he later had two children. Lalithamma died on 17 December 2019 at the age of 89 from post COVID-19 complications. Doreswamy died on 26 May 2021 due to cardiac arrest.

== Awards ==
- 2017 – Conferred the Gandhi Seva Award for providing outstanding service to impoverished sections of the society by the Chief Minister of Karnataka.
- 2018 – Awarded the Basava Puraskara by the Government of Karnataka through the release of 2018 national awardees list.
- 2019 – Ramnath Goenka Excellence in Journalism Awards for Lifetime Achievement.

== Bibliography ==
- From Princely Autocracy to People's Government, Bangalore: Sahitya Mandira, 1993.
