= Gurram Jashuva =

Indian poet (1895–1971)

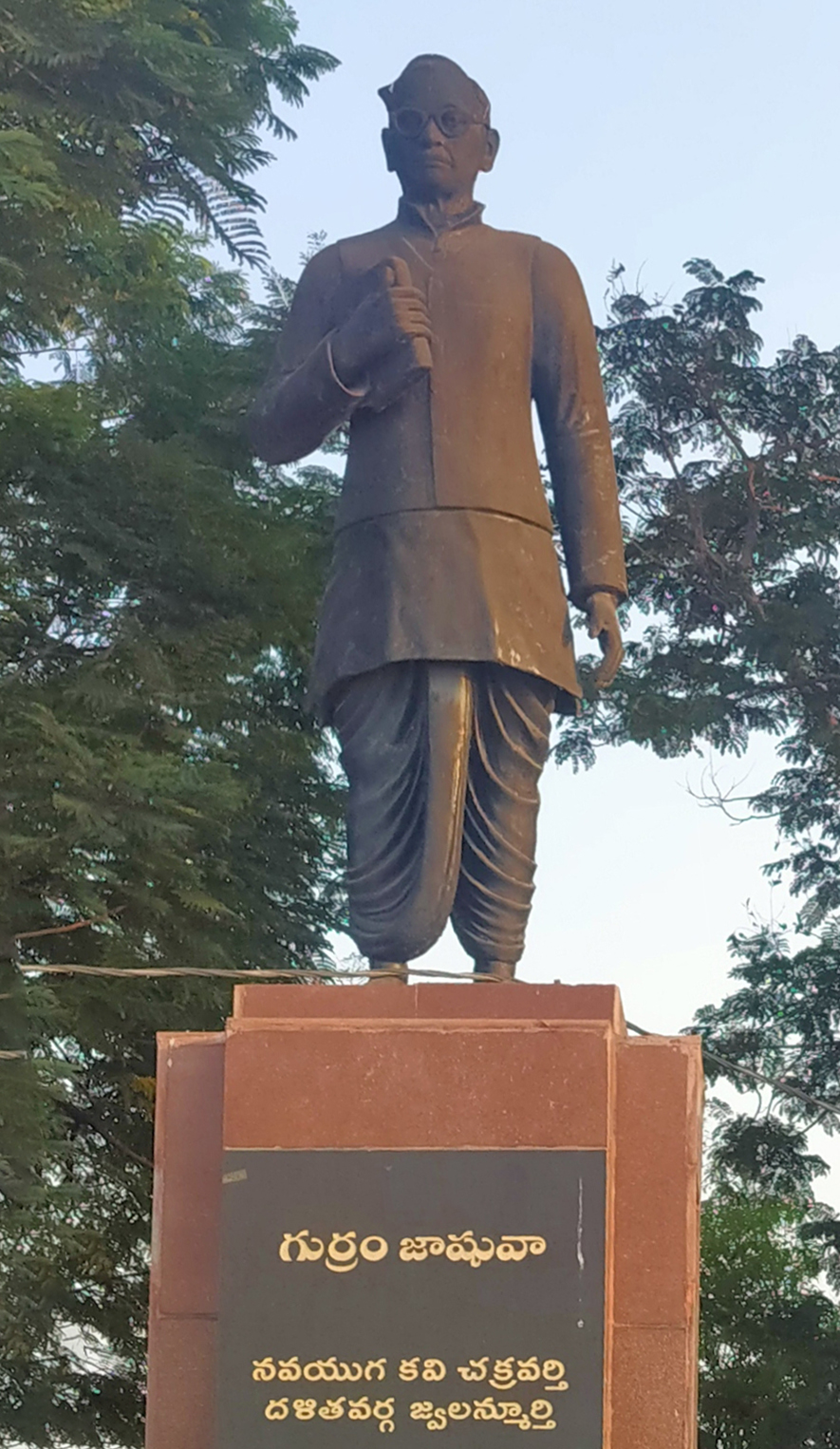
- Born: September 28, 1895; Vinukonda, Guntur, Andhra Pradesh, India
- Died: July 24, 1971 (aged 75); Guntur, Andhra Pradesh, India
- Occupation: Poet
- Spouse: Mariyamma
- Children: Hemalatha Lavanam

Gurram Jashuva (b. September 28, 1895 – d. July 24, 1971) was a Telugu poet. He is legendary figure in the Telugu literary world. With his immense wisdom and through the struggle he faced due to the caste-based discrimination, Jashuva wrote his poetry with a universal approach. He was called the "Poet of the Millennium" for his timeless pieces of poetry and literature.

== Early life ==
Jashuva was born to Virayya and Lingammaa in Vinukonda, Guntur, Andhra Pradesh, India to a community of leather workers. His father belonged to the Yadav caste and his mother belonged to the Madiga caste. Due to poverty and the intercaste marriage of his parents, his childhood was difficult in a society in which some castes were considered "untouchable." Jashuva and his brother were raised by his parents as Christians. In order to fulfill the requirements of higher education, Jashuva obtained the diploma Ubhaya Bhasha Praveena as a scholar of Telugu and Sanskrit languages later his life.

== Career ==
Protests against untouchability, Dalit rights, and segregation have been common themes in all of Jashuva's works. Some of the more notable entries into his literary canon include Gabbilam (A Bat), Firadausi (A Rebel) and Kandiseekudu (A Refugee). A number of verses from Jashuva's work have been incorporated into the popular mythological play, Harischandra, most notably during a scene set in the midst of a cremation ground.

Dalit communities in Andhra Pradesh consider Jashuva to be the first modern Telugu Dalit poet, and actively protest his erasure from Telugu and Indian literary history. In 1995, Dalit communities in Andhra Pradesh began to organize various centennial celebrations for Jashuva's birth, and have recently begun efforts to revive the remembrance of his literary contributions.

== Literary works ==
=== Gabbilam (1941) ===
This is Jashuva's best known work, fashioned after Kālidāsa's Meghadūta (The Cloud Messenger), in which an exiled lover attempts to communicate his affections to his beloved wife. In one stanza, Jashuva writes, "To this friendly bat he began telling his life-story with a heart scorched by sorrow. In this senseless and arrogant world, other than lowly birds and insects, do the poor have any intimates or neighbors, any noble swans to explain his warm tears?"

The man in the poem muses at the irony of his situation, wherein a bat is allowed inside a temple, yet not a human being, requesting that the bat convey his message to Siva with caution, when the priest is not around. As the bat travelled to Lord Siva in Kasi, Jashuva utilized the feeling of patriotism, another theme significant to his work, through vivid descriptions of various historical locations throughout India from the perspective of the bat.

== Timeline ==
- Rukmini Kalyanam (1919)
- Chidananda Prabhatham and Kusalavopakhyanam (1922)
- Kokila (1924)
- Dhruva Vijayam, Krishna Nadi and Samsara Saagaram (1925)
- Sivaji Prabandham, Veera Bai, Krishna Deva Raayalu, Vemana Yogeendrudu and Bhaarata Maatha (1926)
- Bhaarata Veerudu, Suryodayam, Chandrodayam and Gijigaadu (1927)
- Ranachyuthi, Aandhrudanu and Thummeda Pendlikoduku (1928)
- Sakhi, Buddhudu, Telugu Thalli, Sishuvu and Baashpa Sandesam (1929)
- Deergha Niswasamu, Prabodham, Silpi, Hechcharika, Saaleedu and Maathru Prema (1930)
- Bheeshmudu, Yugandhara Manthri, Sama Drushti, Nela Baaludu, Nemali Nelatha, Loka Baandhavudu, Anasuya, Salya Saaradhyamu and Sandeha Dola (1931)
- Swapna Katha, Anaadha, Firdousi, Mumtaj Mahal, Sindhuramu, Budha Mahima, Kreesthu, Gunturu Seema, Vivekananda, Cheetla Peka, Jebunnisa and Paschatthapam (1932)
- Ayomayamu, Akhanda Gouthami, Aaswasam, Meghudu and Smasaana Vaatika (1933)
- Aandhra Bhojudu (1934)
- Gabbilam (1941)
- Kandiseekudu (1945)
- Thera Chaatu (1946)
- Chinna Naayakudu, Baapuji and Nethaji (1948)
- Swayam Varam (1950)
- Kottha Lokam (1957)
- Christhu Charithra (1958)
- Raashtra Pooja and Musafirulu (1963)
- Naagarjuna Saagaram and Naa Katha (1966)

== Awards ==
- Jashuva was presented the Sahitya Akademi Award for his work titled Kreesthu Charitra in 1964.
- Jashuva was appointed to the Andhra Pradesh Legislative Council as a member in 1964.
- Jashuva was awarded the honorary doctorate degree of Kala Prapoorna by Andhra University in 1970.
- Jashuva was awarded the Padma Bhushan by the Government of India in 1970.

== Critical studies ==
Yendluri Sudhakar researched Gurram Jashuva's literature and published a book on his outlook and impact.

== Legacy ==
The Jashuva Sahitya Puraskaram was established by the Jashuva Foundation to distribute an annual prize to poets from varying Indian backgrounds for enriching Indian literature with their contributions. The founder and secretary, Hemalatha Lavanam, is Jashuva's daughter. Nilmani Phukan, an Assamese poet, received the award in 2002.

Padma Bhushan Dr Gurram Jashuva Research Centre of Telugu Akademi distributes three awards to poets and writers for contributions to Telugu literature. These are the "Jashuva Jeevita Saphalya Puraskaram" for male poets aged sixty or above, the "Jashuva Visishta Mahila Purasakaram" for female poets aged fifty or above, and the "Jashuva Sahitya Visishta Puraskaram" for any contributor to Dalita sahityam (Dalit literature). The first of these awards was presented on September 28, 2013, during the one-hundred-and-eighteenth anniversary of Gurram Jashuva's birth. A payment of two lakh rupees are included with each award. Dasaradhi Rangacharya was awarded the "Jashuva Jeevita Saphalya Puraskaram" award, Kolakakuli Swaroopa Rani the "Jashuva Visishta Mahila Purasakaram" award, and Kaluva Mallaiah the "Jashuva Sahitya Visishta Puraskaram" award. Damodar Raja Narasimha, Deputy Chief Minister, Dokka Manikya Vara Prasad, Minister for Rural Development, Kaki Madhava Rao, former Chief Secretary and Medasani Mohan all either hosted or participated in various award-related functions. A commemorative book on the poet was released during one of the functions.
