= Tontadarya Matha =

Lingayata monastery in Gadag, Karnataka, India

Shree Jagadguru Tontadarya Samsthana Math
- Denomination: Lingayatism

People
- Founder(s): Shree Tontad Siddhaling Shivayogi
- Important associated figures: Dr. Siddharam Mahaswamiji (head)

Site
- Location: Gadaga
- Coordinates: 15.430867°N 75.633030°E,
- Website: jtmathgadag.co.in

Shree Jagadguru Tontadarya Samsthana Math is a Lingayata monastery located in the heart of Gadag city of Karnataka. It has a rich history and tradition, and is engaged in many educational and literary activities in and around Gadag.
