= Atheist Centre =

Atheist organization in India

The Atheist Centre is an institution founded by Goparaju Ramachandra Rao (aka Gora, 1902–1975) and Saraswathi Gora (1912–2006) to initiate social change in rural Andhra Pradesh based on the ideology of Gandhism and atheism. Founded in 1940 at Mudnur village in Krishna district in Andhra Pradesh, India the Centre was later shifted to Vijayawada in 1947. As a member organisation of the Federation of Indian Rationalist Associations, the Atheist Centre endorses the Amsterdam Declaration 2002. The institution received the International Humanist and Ethical Union's International Humanist Award in 1986 for pioneering in the field of social work. After the Indian Ocean tsunami, the Atheist Centre worked with the Institute for Humanist Studies to provide aid to the victims of the disaster.

Atheist Centre celebrated its platinum jubilee of 75 years on 5 January 2014. Gora's daughter Mythri is currently the Chairperson, and sons Lavanam and Vijyam continuing as Executive Directors of the Centre.

== Secular social work ==
With the guiding principles of Gora and his positive atheism, Atheist Centre, India brought revolutionary changes in Indian social work. Born for the cause of social change with Gandhian principles, Atheist Centre, India initiated and continuing the social work for social change. Atheist Centre started its work from removal of untouchability in 1940s, Atheist Centre organised the cosmopolitan dinners and inter-caste marriages to annihilate the caste system, exposing superstitious beliefs and promoting scientific temper and humanism. Mahatma Gandhi was impressed with Atheist Centre's work and interested and met atheist Gora. Atheist Centre still continuing the legacy of Gora and Saraswathi Gora in carrying the comprehensive programmes of social as well as individual development for the transformation of society. Atheist Centre initiated social organisation Arthik Samata Mandal, Vasavya Mahila Mandali and Samskar. The first two were founded by Gora and Samskar was started in post-Gora period. Arthik Samata Mandali is involved in integrated rural development and specific programmes for children. It continues as one of the leading organisations in the field of disaster management. The organisation has specific emphasis on weavers and tribal population. The eye camps and polio camps run by the organisation have been popular. Vasavya Mahila Mandali is involved in women's programmes like promotion of women groups for self-help, health programmes, working women's hostel, a shelter home for women with problems, an eye bank and AIDS control. The organisation is highly reputed for its women's counselling programmes in Andhra Pradesh. Samskar (Reform) is an initiative of Atheist Centre's work among the criminal tribes who are now known as denotified tribes. Lavanam, Hemalata Lavanam and others worked in the Criminal settlements of Andhra Pradesh and initiated steps for criminal reformation. Samskar also took up the programme for the eradication of the Jogini system, which is a remnant of the Devadasi in Telangana region of AP. It is a heinous practice thrust on the poor untouchable women in the remote villages of the erstwhile Hyderabad State. Chelli Nilayam, Sister's Home, was founded at Varni, in Nizamabad District in 1987 for the Jogins. All three organisations have their headquarters at Atheist Centre, Vijayawada.

== University and research centre ==
On 26 September 2011, the Atheist Centre announced that it would open a university and research centre founded on the principles of Gora that would serve as India's first atheist university. It will not be affiliated with any conventional institution. Atheist Centre has a library, with a good collection of books by Gora and his articles on atheism, still primary sources research on atheism, humanism and Gandhian philosophy.

== Books and publications ==
The Atheist, an English-language monthly magazine, was established in 1969. It carries articles on atheism, humanism, spirit of inquiry, and scientific reform through secular social work.

Nasthika Margam, a Telugu-language monthly, has been published since 1977. It deals with atheism, rationalism, and women's issues.
