= L. Basavaraju =

Indian writer, scholar and critic

- Born: Lingappa Basavaraju; 5 August 1919; Idagur, Chikkaballapur, Madras Presidency, British India
- Died: 29 January 2012 (aged 92); Mysore, Karnataka, India
- Education: University of Mysore
- Occupation: Writer
- Spouse: B. Vishalakshi (till 2012; his death)
- Children: 2
- Writing career
- Language: Kannada

Lingappa Basavaraju (5 August 1919 – 29 January 2012), commonly known as L. Basavaraju or LB, was an Indian scholar, writer, critic and researcher in Kannada. He was the author of over 56 works and his contribution to Kannada literature spread over 40 years.

== Early life and education ==
Basavaraju was born in Idagur a small village in Chikkaballapur district. After receiving early education in Idagur, Siddaganga and Bangalore, he moved to Mysore for higher education. He obtained B.A (Hons) (1946) and M.A. (1951) degrees in Kannada from the University of Mysore. He was awarded a D.Litt. degree from the same university for his work ‘Shivadasa Geetanjali’. After an early stint of teaching at Davanagere and The Yuvaraja's college, Mysore, Basavaraju joined the Institute of Kannada Studies in the University of Mysore in 1967 and retired in 1979.

== Literary works ==
Basavaraju revolutionized textual criticism by aiming to make classical Kannada literary and scholarly works accessible to those unfamiliar with old Kannada. His innovations included creating simplified prose versions of key texts and reorganizing ancient poems into their morphological components, enhancing readability with appropriate punctuation. Prior to these advancements, he meticulously studied old paper manuscripts and palm leaf texts to uncover their original versions. Basavaraju's selection of works was inclusive, covering Jaina classics like Adipurana, Buddhist masterpieces such as Ashvaghosha's 'Buddhacharita,' and other significant works like Toraveya Ramayana and Shabdamanidarpana. His approach was characterized by a commitment to secularism and a dedication to preserving and presenting Kannada's rich literary heritage.

The works edited by L.Basavaraju include:-

- Basaveshvara Vachanasangraha (1952)
- Allamana Vachanachandrike (1960)
- Shivadasa Geethanjali (1963)
- Basava Vachanamrutha (In two parts) (1964, 1970 and 1989)
- Akkana Vachanagalu (1966)
- Allamana Vachanagalu (1969)
- Basavannanavara Vachanagalu (1996)
- Basavannanavara Shatsthalada Vachanagalu (1990)
- Devara Dasimayyana Vachanagalu
- Sarvajnana Vachanagalu (‘Paramartha’) (1972)
- Bedagina Vachanagalu (1998)
- Shivaganaprasadi Mahadevayyana Prabhudevara Shunyasampadane (1969)
- Kalyanada Mayidevana Shivanubhava Sutra (1998)
- Pampana ‘Adipurana’ (1976)
- Pampana ‘Sarala Pampabharata’ (1999)
- Pampana ‘Samasta Bharatha Kathamrutha’ (2000)
- Pampana ‘Sarala Adipurana’ (2002)
- Pampana Adipurana Kathamrutha (2003)
- Rannana ‘Sarala Gadayuddha’ (2005)
- ‘Chikkadevaraya Saptapadi’ by Tirumalarya (1971)
- ‘Torave Ramayana Sangraha’ (1951)
- ‘Sarala Siddaramacharite’ (2000)
- Raghavankana ‘Sarala Harishchandra Kavya’ (2001)
- ‘Kannada Chandassamputa’ (1974)

(This is an edited work, containing all the four ancient Kannada works on prosody. They are ‘Chandombudhi’ by Nagavarma, ‘Kavijihvabandhana’ by Eshvara Kavi, ‘Chandassara’ by Gunachandra and ‘Chandornava’ by Veerabhadra.)

- "Keshirajana Shabdamanidarpana’ (1986)

L.Basavaraju has translated a few works from Sanskrit. They are

- ‘Buddhacharite’ by Ashvaghosha (2000)
- ‘Soundarananda’ by Ashvaghosha (2000)
- Bhasana ‘Bharata Rupaka’ (1958)
- ‘Natakamrutha Bindugalu’ (1958)
- ‘Ramayana Nataka Triveni’ (1958)

(Translation of three plays by Bhasa including ‘Pratima Nataka’)

- ‘Nijagunashivayogiya Tatvadarshana’ (1961)

(Prose rendering of six philosophical treatises of Nijaguna Shivayogi)

Basavaraju took to creative writing at the age of seventy five and published three collections of poems namely ‘Thanantara’, (1994) (TANAnthara) ‘Jalari’ (jAlAri) (1995) and ‘Chayibaba’ (cAyibAbA) (2005).

=== Works on the life of LB ===
Critic C. P. Siddhashrama has written a book, L. Basavaraju Avara Jeevana Mattu Sahitya Vimarshe (2005).

Writer Kupnalli M. Byrappa has written the book Janamukhi: Prof. L. Basavaraju Avara Kruthishodha.

== Death ==
Basavaraju died on the night of 29 January 2012 at Mysore.

== Awards ==
He received several awards, including:

- 1977 - Karnataka Sahitya Academy.
- 1994 - Kannada Rajyothsava Award
- 1994 - Karnataka Sahitya Akademi Award for Poetry for Thaanaanthara
- 2000 - Sahitya Akademi Prize for Translation in Kannada.
- 2005 - Bhasha Samman conferred by Central Sahitya Akademi.
- 2005 – Basava Puraskara
- 2008 - Nadoja Award by Kannada University

The other awards conferred on him are Chidhananda Award, Prof. Sam.Shi. Bhusanur Mutt Foundation Award, Pampa Prashasthi and the Chavundaraya Award. The areas of his specialization included textual criticism, prosody, literary research and translation. He tried his hand in poetry as well and published three collections.
