= Vinukonda =

Vinukonda Vishnukundinapuram
- Town
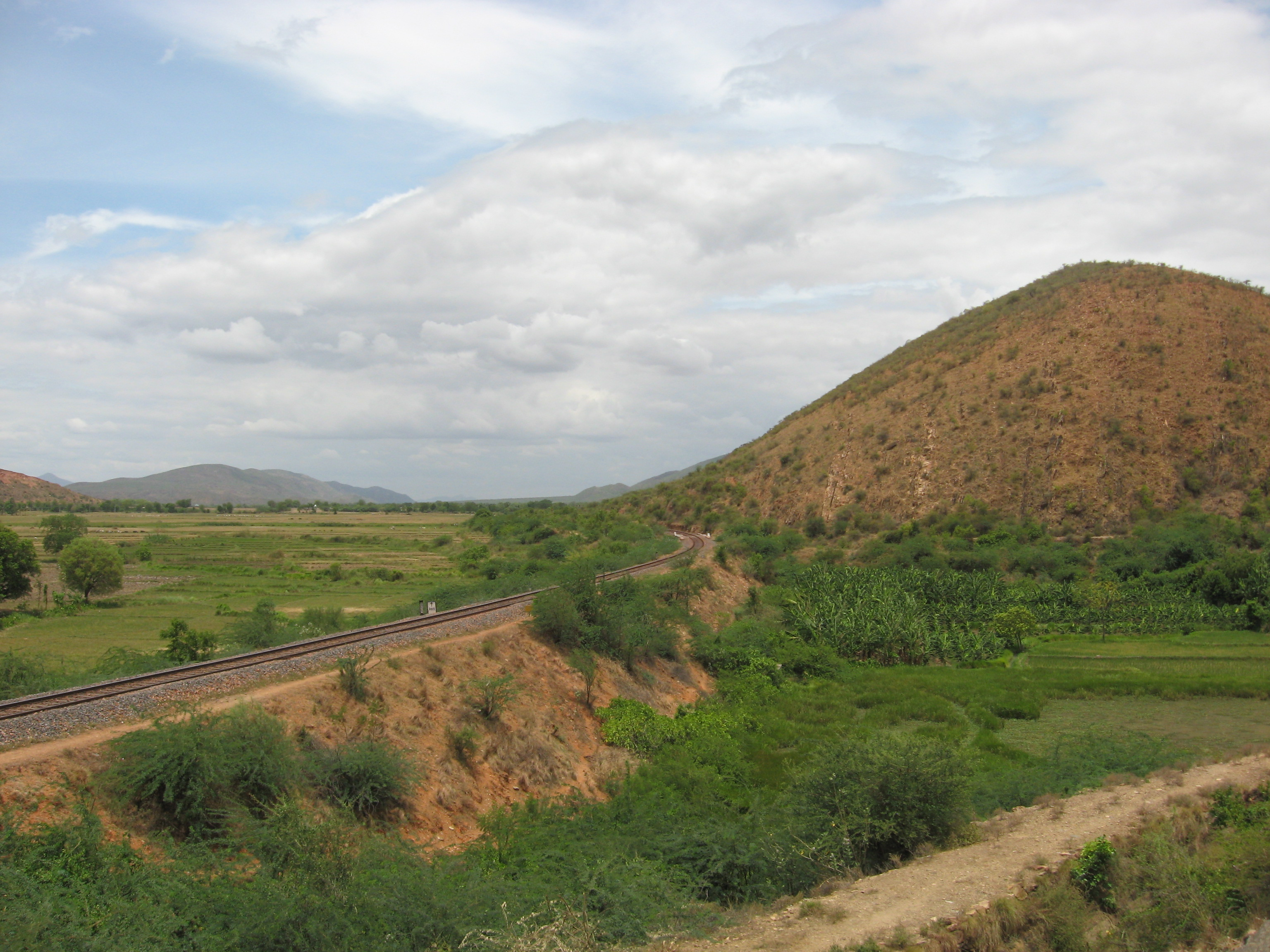
- Vinukonda-Nandyal Railway Section along Nallamala Hills
- Interactive map of Vinukonda
- Location in Andhra Pradesh, India
- Coordinates: 16.05°N 79.75°E
- Country: India
- State: Andhra Pradesh
- District: Palnadu
- Incorporated (town): 29 May 2015

Government
  - Type: Municipal council

Area
  - Total: 37.53 km^{2} (14.49 sq mi)
- Elevation: 95 m (312 ft)

Population (2024)
  - Total: 87,000
  - Density: 2,300/km^{2} (6,000/sq mi)

Languages
  - Official: Telugu
- Time zone: UTC+5:30 (IST)
- PIN: 522 647
- Vehicle registration: AP-39
- Website: vinukonda.cdma.ap.gov.in

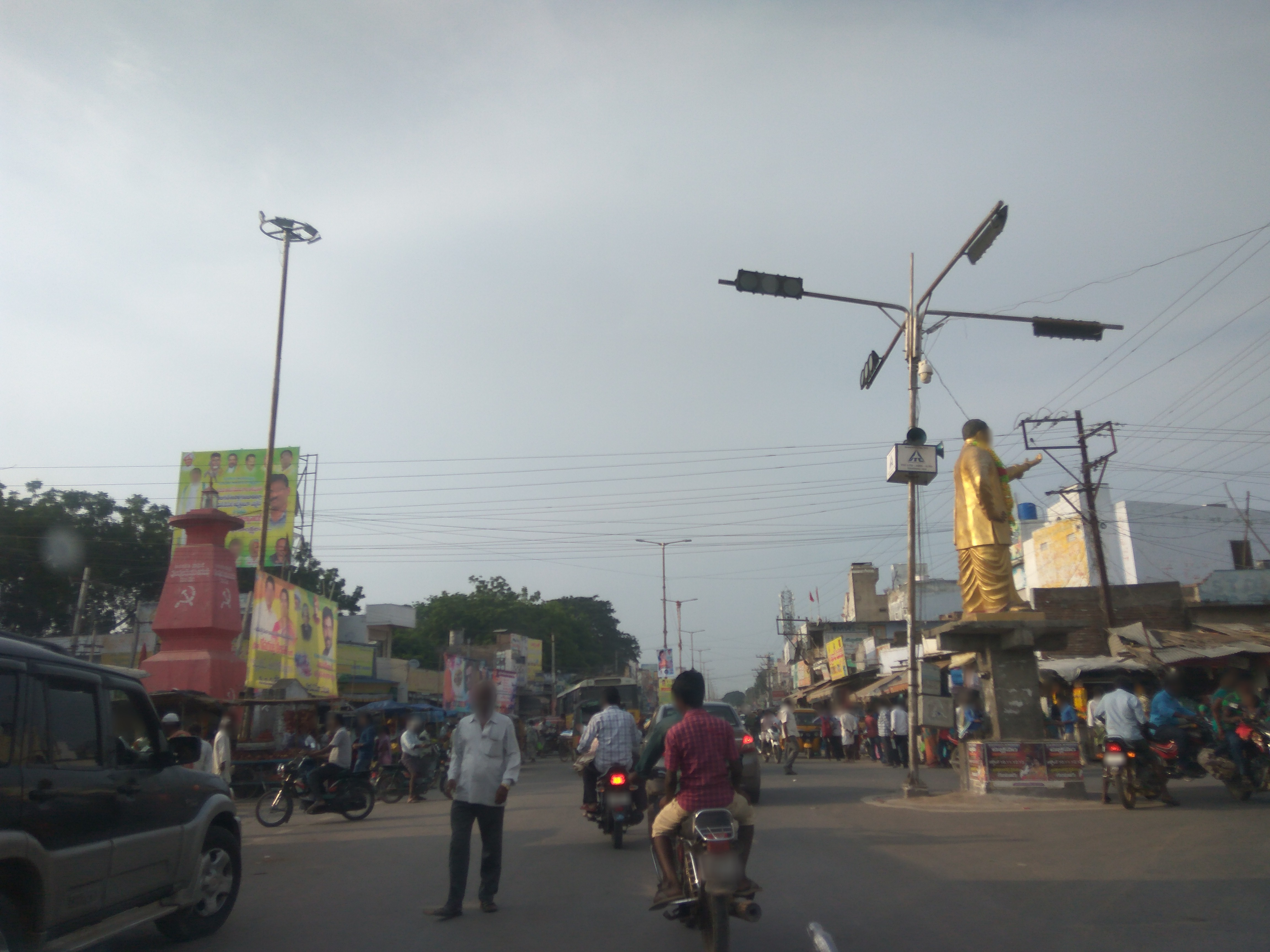
Vinukonda Junction

Vinukonda is a town in Palnadu district of the Indian state of Andhra Pradesh. It is a municipality and the headquarters of Vinukonda mandal and administered under Narasaraopet revenue division.

== Etymology ==
The town was formerly known as Vishnukundinapuram. The hill is in the shape of a tortoise. Many temples are also found on the top of the hill. Srigangasametha Ramalingeswara Swamy temple (according to available sources the deity present in temple was sanctified by Lord Rama). Down the hill Sri Lakshmi Narasimha Swamy temple was found which was constructed in Gupta's rule.At the base of a small hill, there is a temple known as Sri Gunti Anjaneya Swami Vari Devasthanam, which is famous for its miracles.

== History ==
Dolmens and other megalithic structures have been found in the town's neighbourhood. Inscriptions from about 1000–1400 CE are also to be found in many old temples. The Vishnukundinas, a local dynasty, ruled the adjoining areas from here during the turn of the millennium. During the medieval era, the hill nearby was the site of a fortress. A four-hundred-year-old Jamia Masjid, built in 1640, is the only major relic of Muslim rule in the town.

== Geography ==
Vinukonda is located at 16.05°N 79.75°E. It has an average elevation of 75 metres (246 feet). Much like the rest of Palnadu district, it has very hot summers and mild winters. Rainfall is mostly in July to September. High concentrations of fluorides are found in the underground water reserves and potable water is therefore rare. Summer storage tank is the source of drinking water for the village.

== Demographics ==
The town had a population of 60,420 and an urban agglomeration population of 63,450.

== Governance ==
Vinukonda municipality is the civic administrative body of the city. It is a second grade municipality, constituted on 29 May 2005 and spread over an area of 22.82 km^{2} (8.81 sq mi). The urban agglomeration constituents of the town are Vinukonda municipality and a partial out growth of Brahmanapalle village. The current Member of Legislative Assembly representing Vinukonda town area is Sri G. V. Anjaneyulu from the TDP.

== Transport ==
The town has a total road length of 106.70 km (66.30 mi). It is located on Guntur–Kurnool–Bellary highway. Vinukonda railway station is located on the Guntur–Guntakal railway line and falls under the Guntur railway division of South Central Railway. A road through Nagarjuna Sagar located at Macherla is a way to reach its neighbouring state Telangana and provides a shorter route to reach the capital city of Telangana, Hyderabad.

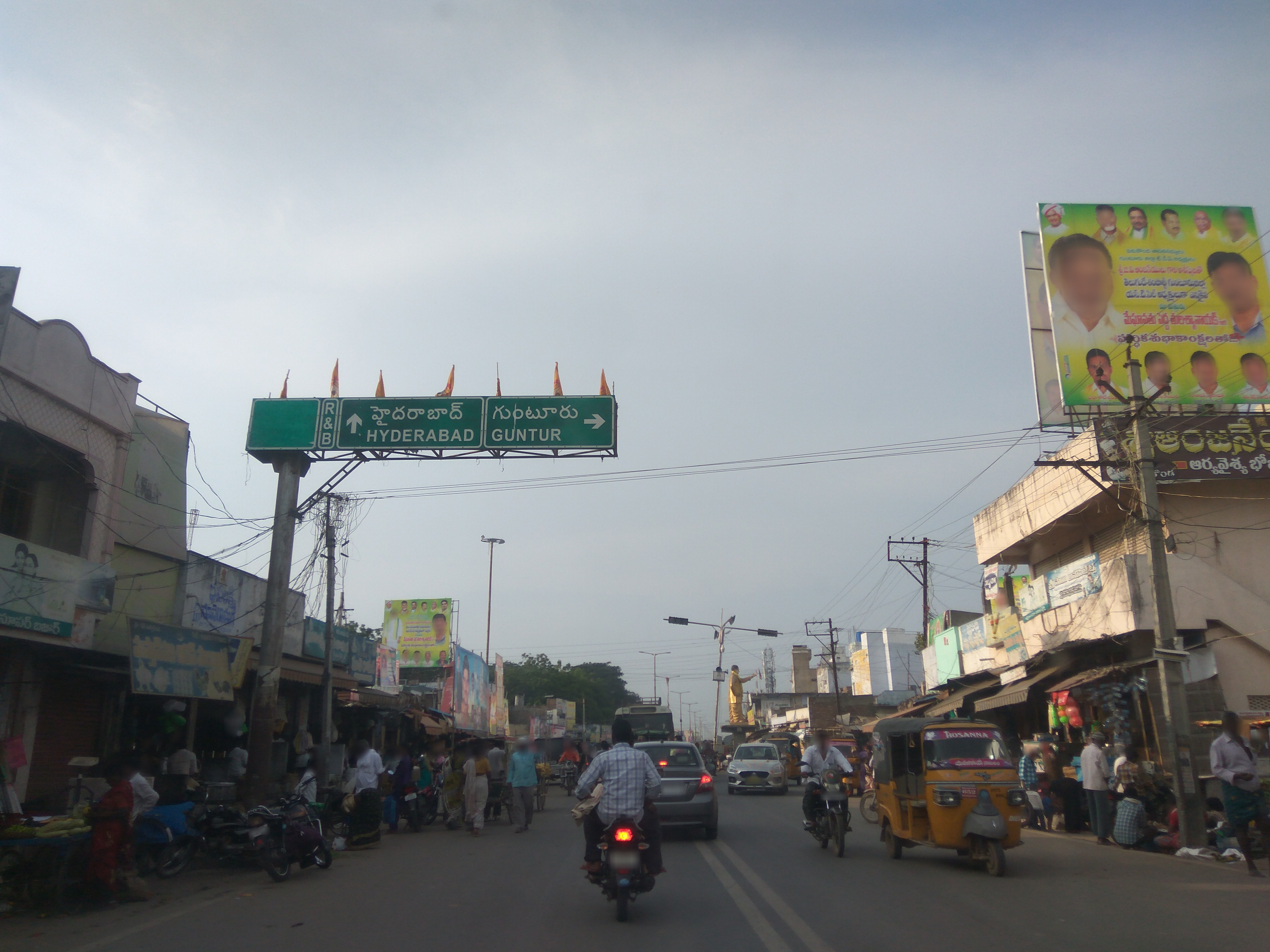
A road in Vinukonda showing directions to Hyderabad and Palnadu district.

== Education ==
The primary and secondary school education is imparted by government, aided and private schools, under the School Education Department of the state. The medium of instruction followed by different schools are English and Telugu.
