= Siddaganga Matha =

Lingayata monastery in Tumkur, Karnataka, India

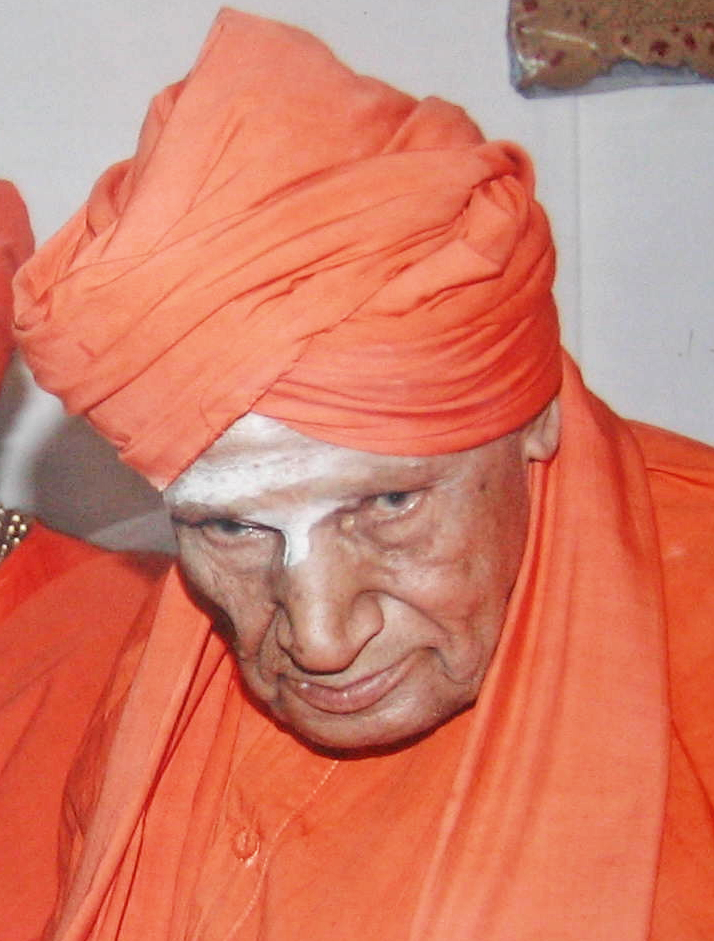
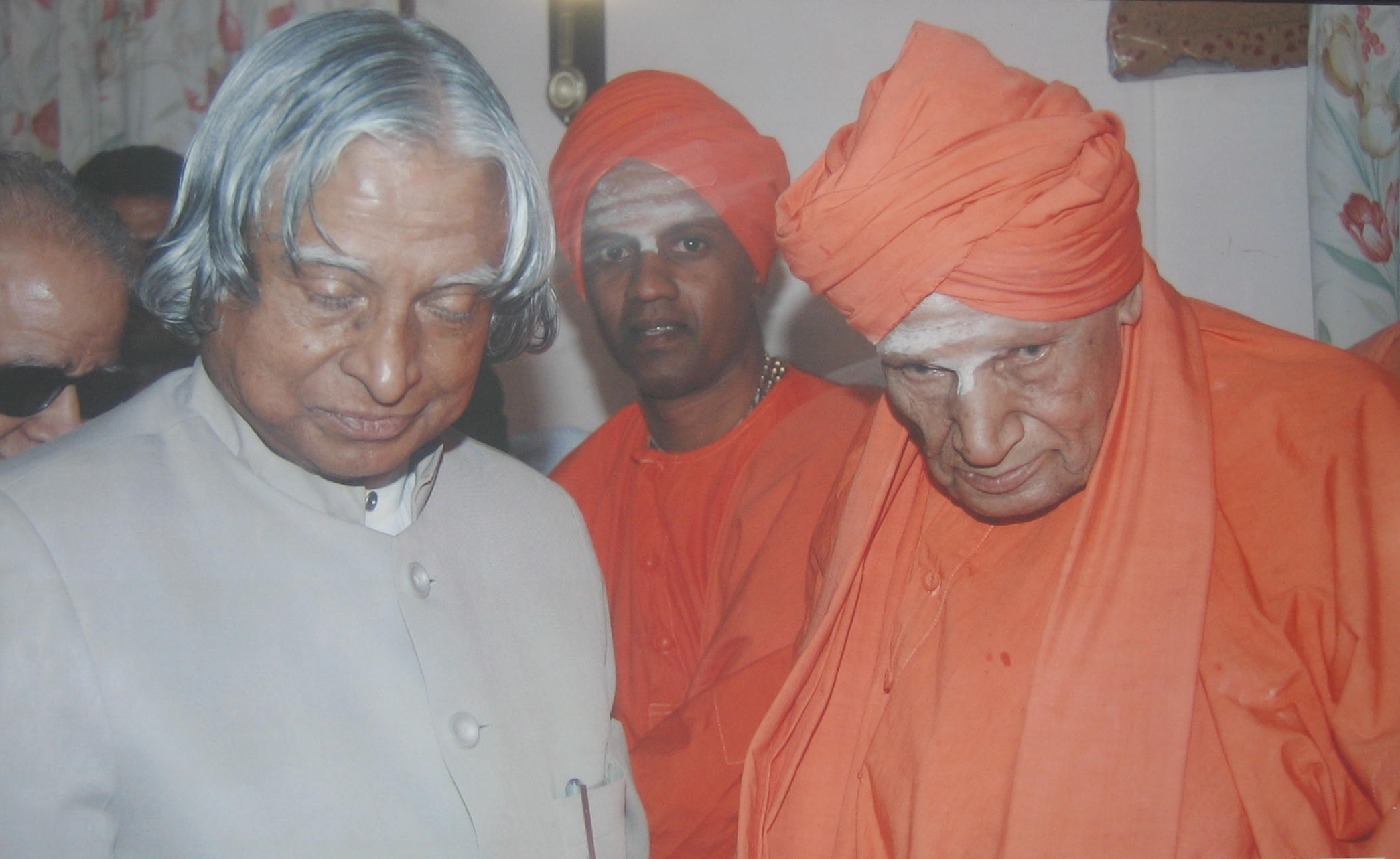
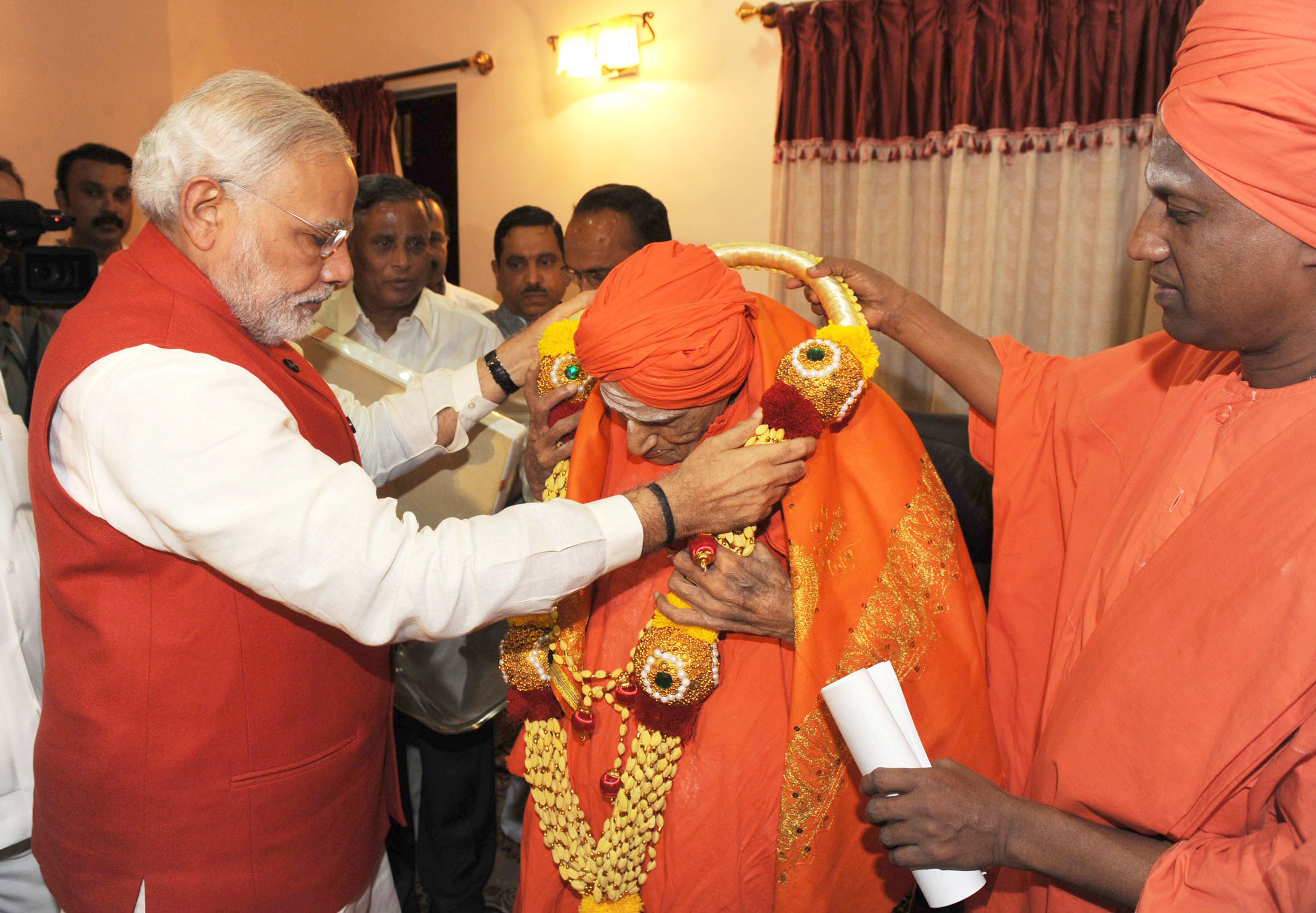
- Shivakumara Swami Shivakumara Swami with Abdul Kalam Shivakumar Swami with Narendra Modi
- Interactive map of Siddaganga Matha

Monastery information
- Denomination: Lingayatism

People
- Founder: Shree Haradanahalli Gosala Siddeshwara Swamigalu
- Important associated figures: Shree Siddalinga Swami (head)

Site
- Location: Tumkur
- Coordinates: 13.321745°N 77.148596°E
- Website: siddagangamath.org

Shree Siddaganga Matha also known as Shree Siddaganga Kshetra, is a Lingayata monastery, with an attached educational institution. The matha was established by Sri Haradanahalli Gosala Siddeshwara Swamigalu in the 15th century at a village near Tumkur in the Karnataka state of India. The 44th Kannada Sahithya Sammelana was held in 1963 in Siddaganga, under the presidency of R. S. Mugali.

== See also ==
- Tumkur
- Districts of Karnataka
