= Sastry =

Sastry may refer to:

== People ==
- Ajay Sastry (born 1975), director and writer
- Ann Marie Sastry, American engineer, educator, and businessperson
- Arvind Sastry (born 1990), screenwriter
- B. V. K. Sastry (1916–2003), writer and music critic
- Bhagavatula Sadasiva Shankara Sastry
- Chellapilla Satyanarayana Sastry
- Chellapilla Venkata Sastry (1870–1950), Telugu language poet laureate and scholar
- Devudu Narasimha Sastri (1895–1962), Kannada writer, novelist, Sanskrit scholar, ritualist, actor and journalist
- Devulapalli Krishnasastri (1887–1980), Telugu poet, playwright, and translator
- Dhulipala Seetarama Sastry (1921–2007)
- Divakarla Tirupati Sastry (1872–1920), Telugu language poet and scholar
- Emani Sankara Sastry (1922–1987), Veena player of Carnatic music
- Gangadhara Sastry (born 1967), Indian singer and composer
- Garikapati Narahari Sastry (born 1966), Indian chemist
- J. C. M. SastryIndian (1936–2005), nephrologist
- Jandhyala Papayya Sastry (1912–1992), Telugu writer and lyricist
- Jandhyala Subramanya Sastry Indian film screenwriter, director and actor
- K. N. T. Sastry (1945–2018), National Award-winning Telugu film director.
- Kaliakudi Natesa Sastry, exponent of Harikatha
- Kapali Sastry (1886–1953), Sanskrit scholar, author, translator, and disciple of Sri Aurobindo
- Kasibhatta Brahmaiah Sastry (1863–1940), Sanskrit and Telugu scholar
- Madhunapantula Satyanarayana Sastry (1920–1992), poet
- Malladi Chandrasekhara Sastry (1925–2022), scholar and television personality
- Malladi Ramakrishna Sastry (1905–1965), Telugu writer
- Melattur Venkatarama Sastry (1770–1830), Telugu poet and playwright
- Mokkapati Narasimha Sastry (1892–1973), Indian Telugu language novelist
- Murali Sastry (born 1959), Indian scientist
- Panchagnula Adinarayana Sastry (1890–1951)
- Patrayani Seetharama Sastrya singer, teacher and music composer of Andhra
- Penumarti Viswanatha Sastry (1929–1998), Telugu writer and editor
- Podili Brahmayya Sastry
- Puranam Srinivasa Sastry (born 1953), Indian writer
- R. V. S. Peri Sastri, former Chief Election Commissioner of India
- Rachakonda Viswanatha Sastry (1922–1993), writer of in Telugu literature
- Ramajogayya Sastry (born 1970), Indian Telugu lyricist
- Ramayanam Sarveswara Sastry (1889–1962), actor
- Rambhatla Lakshminarayana Sastry (1908–1995), Telugu and Sanskrit scholar
- Ravi Shastri (born 1962), Indian cricketer
- S. Shankar Sastry, Dean of the College of Engineering at the University of California, Berkeley.
- Savitha Sastry (born 1969), Bharatanatyam dancer
- Sirivennela Sitaramasastri
- Sosale Garalapury Sastry (1899–1955), Indian industrial chemist
- Srikanth Sastry, Boston University Professor awarded the Shanti Swarup Bhatnagar
- Sripada Krishnamurty Sastry (1866–1960), poet
- Sripada Subrahmanya Sastry (1891–1961), Telugu writer from Andhra Pradesh
- Trilochan Sastry, former Dean at Indian Institute of Management, Bangalore
- Tripuraribhatla Ramakrishna Sastry (1914–1998), actor
- V. Kutumba Sastry (born 1950), Indian academic, Vice-Chancellor of the Rashtriya Sanskrit Sansthan
- Veda Archana Sastry, Indian film actress
- Vedam Venkataraya Sastry (1853–1929), Sanskrit and Telugu poet and critic
- Vedantam Ramalinga Sastry, Indian classical dancer in Kuchipudi
- Veluri Venkata Krishna Sastry, archaeologist and historian in Andhra Pradesh
- Vuppuluri Ganapathi Sastry (1898–1989), Indian Sanskrit scholar, writer, and spiritual teacher

== See also ==
- Sastri
- Sastry automorphism, in mathematics, an automorphism of a field of characteristic 2
- Sastry number, in mathematics, an integer n so that n concatenated with (n+1) is an integer square number.
- Shastry
