= Chinaravuru =

- Neighborhood
- Interactive map of Chinaravuru
- Location in Andhra Pradesh, India
- Coordinates: 16.2198°N 80.6632°E
- Country: India
- State: Andhra Pradesh
- District: Guntur
- Mandal: Tenali

Area
  - Rural: 8.95 km^{2} (3.46 sq mi)

Population (2011)
  - Rural: 5,058

Languages
  - Official: Telugu
- Time zone: UTC+5:30 (IST)

Chinaravuru is an area of Tenali in Guntur district of the Indian state of Andhra Pradesh. It is located in Tenali Mandal of Tenali revenue division. It has become of the important parts of Tenali city. Chinnaravuru park located here is the biggest attraction of Tenali. It forms a part of Andhra Pradesh Capital Region.

== Geography ==
Chinaravuru is situated to the southeast of Tenali, at 16.2198°N 80.6632°E.

== Government and politics ==
Chinaravuru gram panchayat is the local self-government of the village. There are wards, each represented by an elected ward member. The present sarpanch is vacant, elected indirectly by the ward members. The village is administered by the Tenali Mandal Parishad at the intermediate level of panchayat raj institutions.

== Demographics ==
As of 2011 census, Chinaravuru (rural) had a population of 5,058. The total population constitutes 2,553 males and 2,505 females —a sex ratio of 981 females per 1000 males. 524 children are in the age group of 0–6 years, of which 266 are boys and 258 are girls. The average literacy rate stands at 73.73% with 3,343 literates.

== Transport ==
Tenali–Kollur road passes through the village. Chinaravuru railway station is situated on the mutual Tenali-Repalle branch line and administered under Guntur railway division of South Central Railway zone. The nearest major railway station to the village is Tenali JunctionTenali. APSRTC Tenali operates the buses from the Chinnaravuru Bus stand to Tenali Bus stand, Mangalagiri, Vijayawada and many cities like Hyderabad and Visakhapatnam. The buses are very frequent to Tenali from the park.

== Education ==
Kendriya Vidyalaya, a central government school, was established in the village.

Schools like Nehru niketan, Sharon, Sri Chaitanya, Bhashyam, Viswa Bharati also have branches here.

== See also ==
- List of villages in Guntur district
- Chinaravuru lake park
- Chinaravuru Railway Station
