= Kolakaluru =

- Neighborhood
- Kolakaluru railway station signboard
- Interactive map of Kolakaluru
- Location in Andhra Pradesh, India
- Coordinates: 16.3052°N 80.6182°E
- Country: India
- State: Andhra Pradesh
- District: Guntur
- Mandal: Tenali

Government
  - Type: Panchayati raj
  - Body: Kolakaluru gram panchayat
  - Sarpanch: Dr.Choppara Preethi

Area
  - Total: 250 km^{2} (97 sq mi)

Population (2011)
  - Total: 15,607
  - Density: 62/km^{2} (160/sq mi)

Languages
  - Official: Telugu
- Time zone: UTC+5:30 (IST)
- PIN: 522307
- Area code: +91–8644
- Vehicle registration: AP

Kolakaluru is a neighborhood of Tenali city in Guntur district of the Indian state of Andhra Pradesh. It is located in Tenali mandal of Tenali revenue division. It forms a part of Andhra Pradesh Capital Region.

== History ==
The 13th and 14th century inscriptions related to Chola dynasty, Prataparudra II on temples and excavation of ancient treasures, depicts the historical significance of the region around the village.

== Geography ==
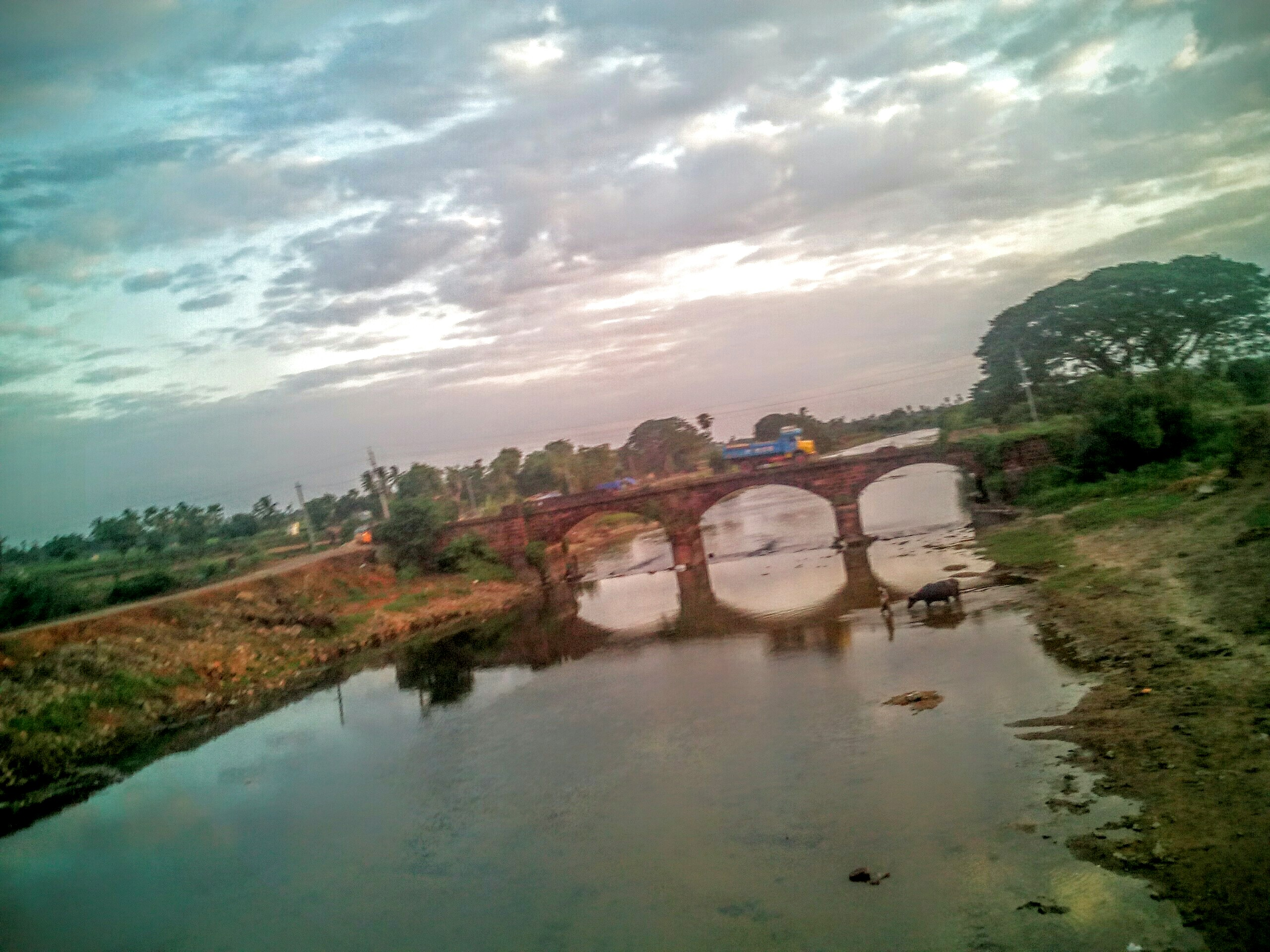
Canal at Kolakaluru

Kolakaluru is situated to the southeast of Tenali, at 16.3052°N 80.6182°E. The village is spread over an area of 25.58 km^{2} (9.88 sq mi).

== Demographics ==
As of 2011 census, Kolakaluru had a population of 15,607. The population included 7,731 males and 7,876 females —a sex ratio of 1,019 females per 1000 males. 1,500 children were in the age group of 0–6 years, of which 758 were boys and 742 girls. The average literacy rate stood at 70.89%, compared to the state average of 67.41%, with 10,001 literates in the village population.

== Government and politics ==
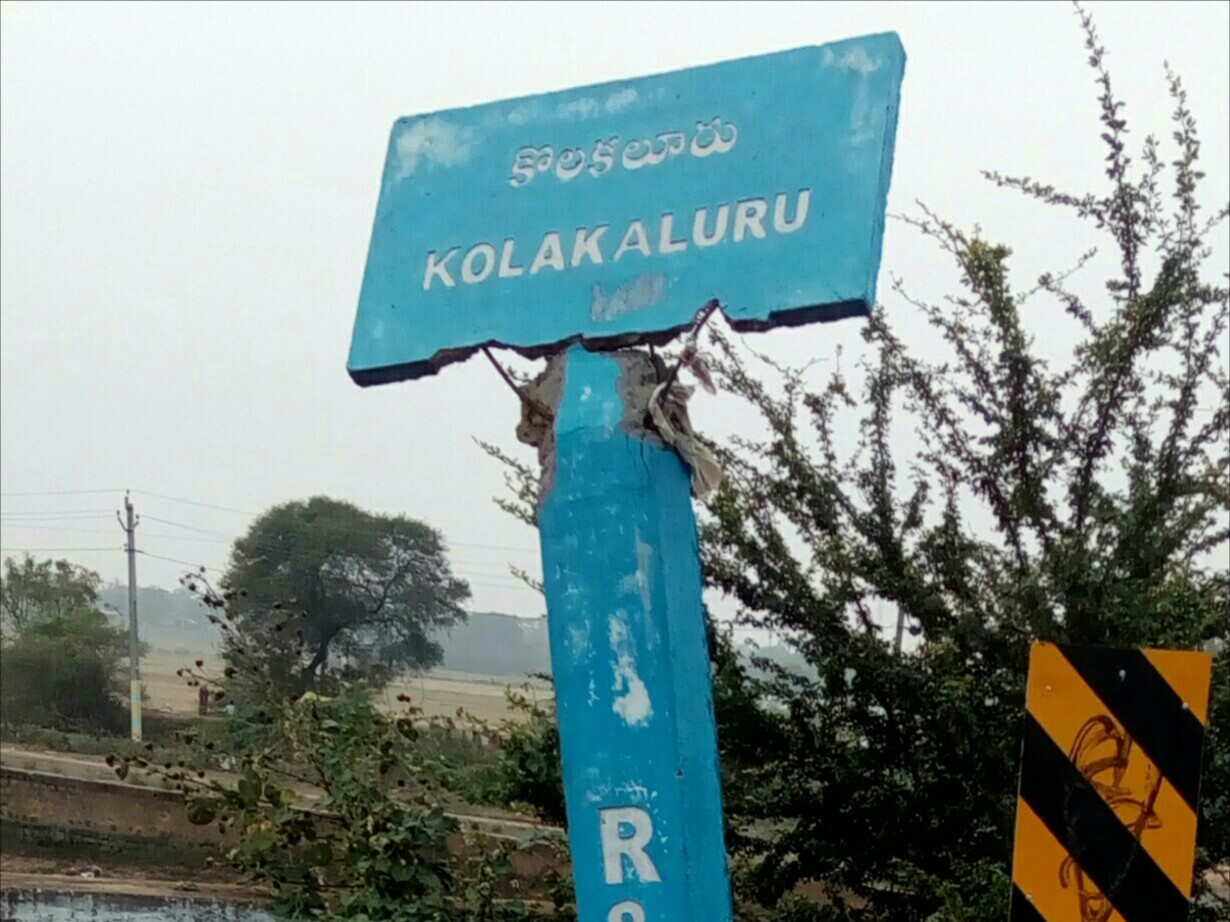
Kolakaluru signboard

Kolakaluru gram panchayat is the local self-government of the village. There are 16 wards, each represented by an elected ward member. The present sarpanch is Choppara Preeti, elected by the ward members. The village is administered by the Tenali Mandal Parishad at the intermediate level of panchayat raj institutions.

Kolakaluru in Tenali mandal is represented by Tenali assembly constituency of Andhra Pradesh Legislative Assembly. The present MLA representing the constituency is Nadendla Manohar of Janasena Party.

== Transport ==
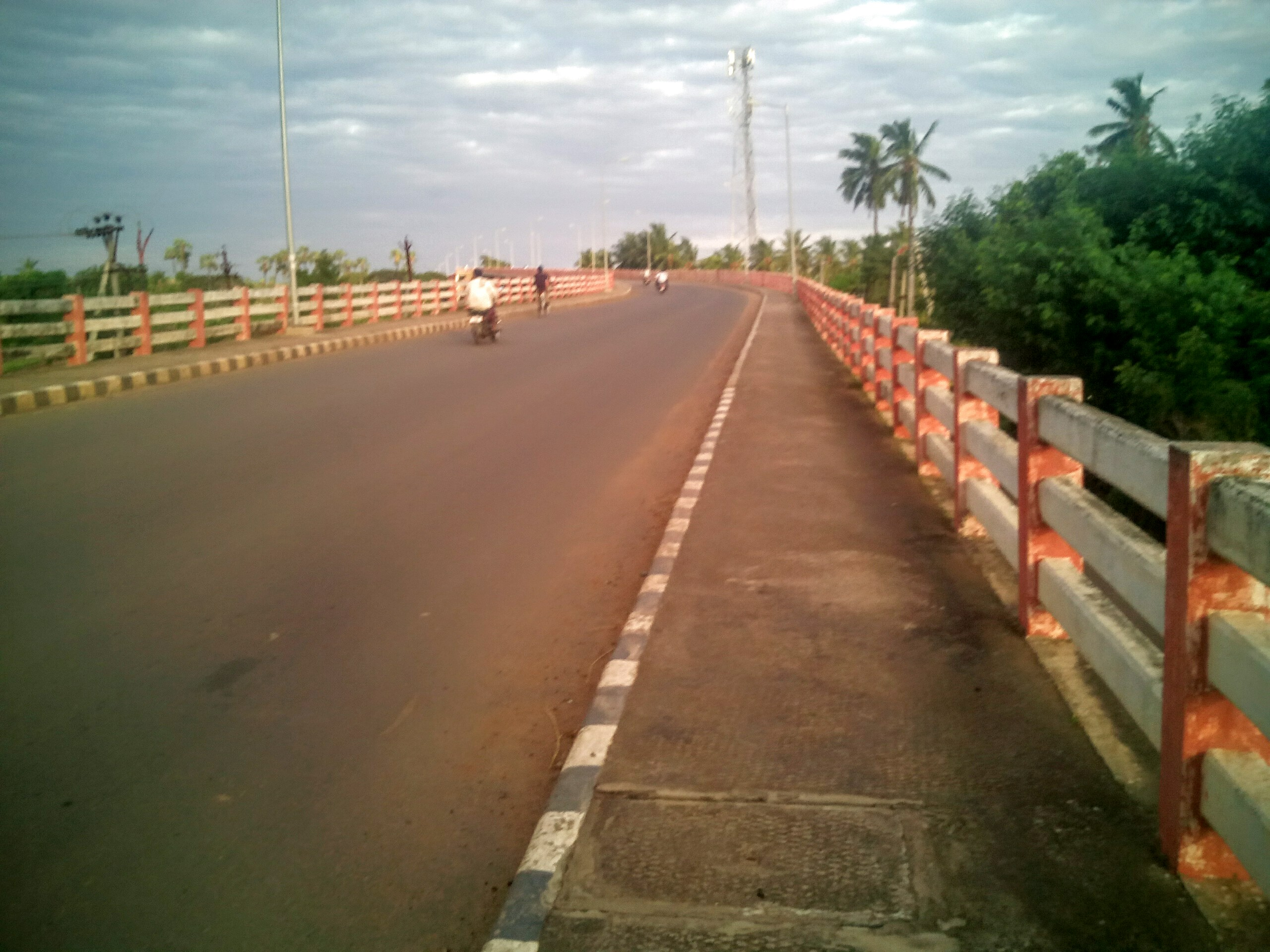
Road over bridge at Kolakaluru on Guntur-Nandivelugu road

Guntur-Nandivelugu road passes through the village and connects it with the district headquarter. Kolakaluru railway station is situated on the mutual Howrah-Chennai and New Delhi–Chennai main lines. It is administered under Vijayawada railway division of South Central Railway zone.

Kolakaluru Village is well connected to Tenali City. Tenali is the city that is much near to kolakaluru village at the distance of 10 km. According to 2011 in the Tenali City expansion the kolakaluru village was there. The Nearest railway station to the Village are kolakaluru railway station and Tenali junction railway station.

== Education ==
The primary and secondary school education is imparted by government, aided and private schools, under the School Education Department of the state. The total number of students enrolled in primary, upper primary and high schools of the village are 1,731. There are 15 schools which include, six private, eight Mandal Parishad and ZPHS, and other types of school as well.

== See also ==
- Villages in Tenali mandal
