= Tripuraribhatla Ramakrishna Sastry =

Indian actor (1914–1998)

T. Ramakrishna Sastry
- Born: Tripuraribhatla Ramakrishna Sastry; 10 April 1914; Pedaravooru, Tenali tq, Andhra Pradesh
- Died: 21 May 1998 (aged 84); Tenali, Andhra Pradesh
- Occupation: Actor

Tripuraribhatla Ramakrishna Sastry or T. Ramakrishna Sastry (10 April 1914 – 21 May 1998) was a famous stage and film actor in the early period of Telugu cinema. He was famous in portraying the role of Narada in about 12 films.

He was born to Tripuraribhatla Raghavaiah and Kameswaramma in Pedaravooru of Tenali taluq in Guntur district, Andhra Pradesh. He joined Rama Vilasa Sabha of Tenali and started as a child actor when 9 years old. He acted in Balamitra Sabha of Dantu Venkata Krishnayya in Guntur from 1926 onwards — Roshanara, Krishna Leelalu, Ramadasu plays – and toured South India.

While he was playing with Sthanam Narasimha Rao and C. S. R. Anjaneyulu, eminent film director Chitrapu Narayana Murthy was impressed by his performance and invited him to act in his film Mohini Rugmangada in 1937. He portrayed the Narada character with devotion and won applause of wide audience. Subsequently, he has acted in about 12 films including Markandeya, Dakshayagnam, Prahlada, Mairavana, Sumati and played different roles.

Returning to the stage, he acted in the Ramanjaneya Yudham play of Betha Venkata Rao as Narada and gave hundreds of performances. He has earned a good name in playing Bilvamangala, Shivayogi, Ramadasu, Kabir and Narada. He participated in Tulabharam play of Sthanam Narasimha Rao before Jawaharlal Nehru in New Delhi in 1952.

He died at the age of 84 years in Tenali in the house of his son-in-law on 21 May 1998.

== Filmography ==
1. Mohini Rugmangada (1937)
2. Markandeya (1938)
3. Mahiravana (1940)
4. Dakshayagnam (1941)
5. Sumati (1942)
6. Garuda Garvabhangam (1943)
