= Kattevaram =

- Village
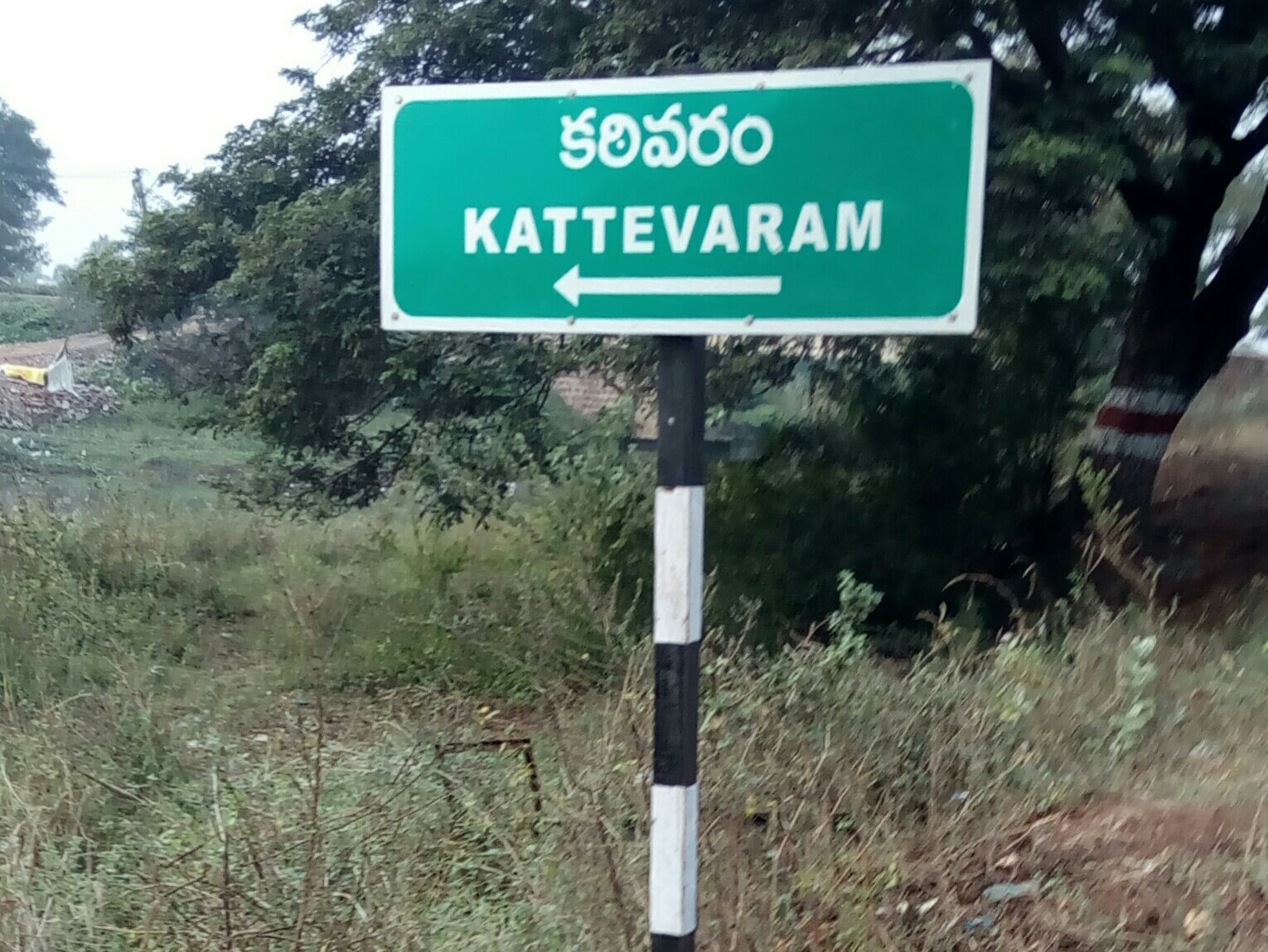
- Kattevaram signboard
- Interactive map of Kattevaram
- Location in Andhra Pradesh, India
- Coordinates: 16.261°N 80.636°E
- Country: India
- State: Andhra Pradesh
- Seat: Kattevaram Gram Panchayat
- Wards: 14

Government
  - Type: Panchayati raj
  - Body: Kattevaram Gram Sabha
  - Sarpanch: Vacant

Area
  - Total: 16.96 km^{2} (6.55 sq mi)

Population (2011)
  - Total: 13,209
  - Density: 778.8/km^{2} (2,017/sq mi)

Languages
  - Official: Telugu
- Time zone: UTC+5:30 (IST)
- Postal code: 522202

Kattevaram is a village in Guntur district of the Indian state of Andhra Pradesh. It is located in Tenali mandal of Tenali revenue division. It forms a part of Andhra Pradesh Capital Region.

== Geography ==
Kattevaram is situated to the north of Tenali, at 16.261°N 80.636°E.

== Demographics ==
As of 2011 census, Katevaram had a population of 13,209, including 6,608 males and 6,601 females —a sex ratio of 999 females per 1000 males. 1,384 children were in the age group of 0–6 years, of which 731 were boys and 653 girls. The average literacy rate stood at 71.52% with 8,457 literates, significantly higher than the state average of 67.41% at that time.

== Government and politics ==
Kattevaram gram panchayat is the local self-government of the village. There are 14 wards, each represented by an elected ward member. The present sarpanch is Bandikalla Prasad, elected by the ward members. The village is administered by the Tenali Mandal Parishad at the intermediate level of panchayat raj institutions.

== Education ==
Katevaram Zilla Parishad High School is a Zilla Parishad funded school, which provides secondary education in the village.

== See also ==
- List of villages in Guntur district
