= Satyanarayana UDA Lake Park =

Park in Tenali, India

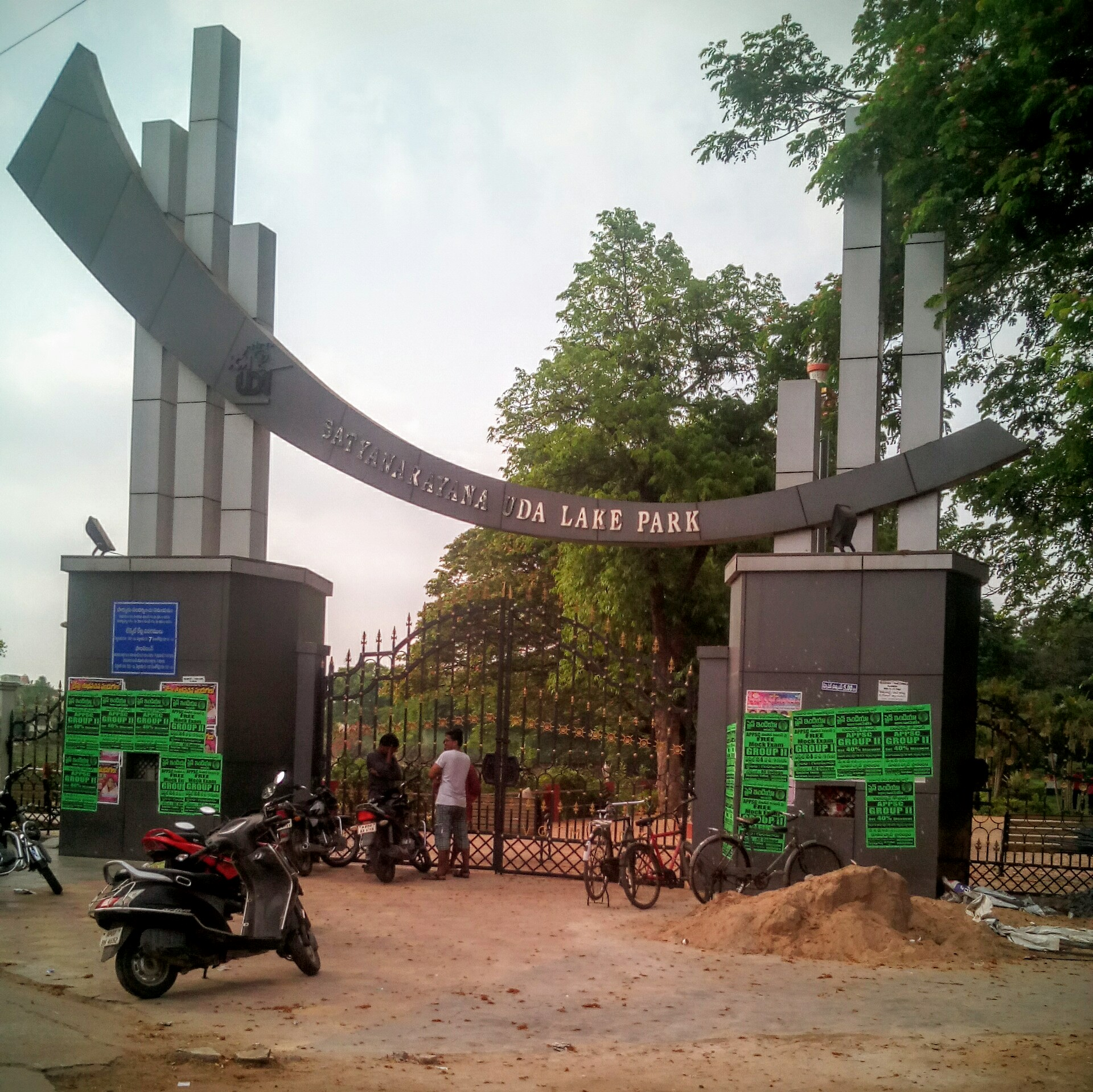
- Satyanarayana UDA lake park at Chinnaravuru, Tenali
- Interactive map of Satyanarayana UDA Lake Park
- Type: Urban Park
- Location: Tenali, Andhra Pradesh, India
- Coordinates: 16.227°N 80.652°E
- Created: April 2002
- Operator: APCRDA; VGTMUDA {former}
- Status: Open all year

Satyanarayana UDA Lake Park (or Satyanarayana Urban Development Authority Lake Park or Chinaravuru Lake Park), is a park located in Tenali of the Indian state of Andhra Pradesh. The park was inaugurated by N. Chandrababu Naidu in April 2002 and is spread over an area of 7 acres (2.8 ha). It was named after the former chairman of Tenali Municipality, Ravi Satyanarayana.

== Administration ==
The administration of the park was undertaken by VGTMUDA for developmental activities, which is now dissolved to form APCRDA.
