= Nelapadu =

Nelapadu may refer to:

- Nelapadu, Amaravati, a neighbourhood of Amaravati, Guntur district, Andhra Pradesh, India
- Nelapadu, Tenali mandal, a village in Tenali mandal, Guntur district, Andhra Pradesh, India
