= Chinnaravuru railway station =

Railway station in Andhra Pradesh, India

Chinnaravuru
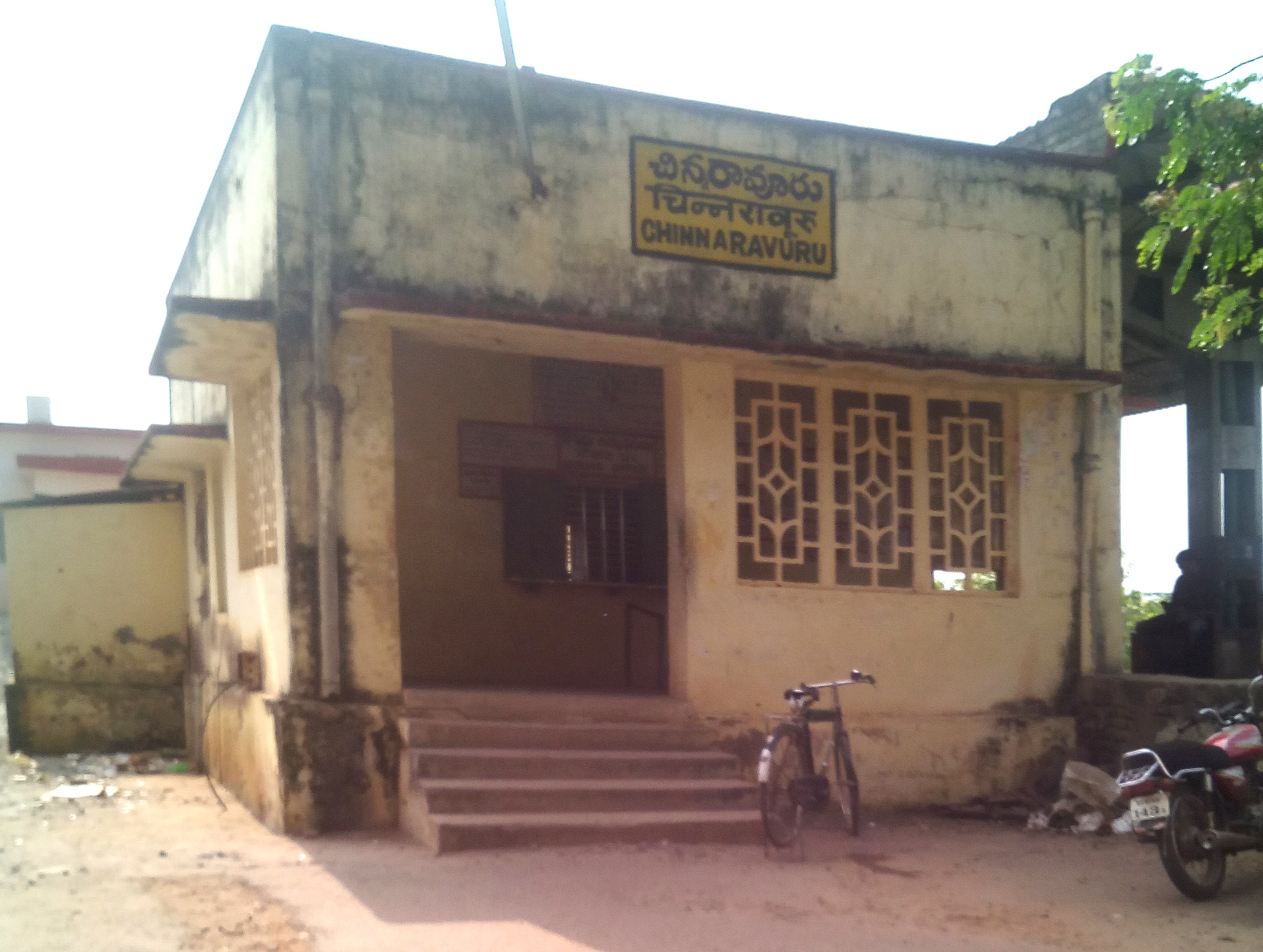
- Chinnaravuru railway station

General information
- Location: Chinaravuru, Tenali, Guntur district, Andhra Pradesh; India
- Coordinates: 16°13′25″N 80°39′22″E
- System: Commuter and Regional rail station
- Owner: Indian Railways
- Operator: Indian Railways
- Line: Guntur–Tenali section
- Distance: 6 km (3.7 mi) from Tenali; 31 km (19 mi) from Repalle
- Platforms: 1

Construction
- Structure type: Standard (on ground)

Other information
- Station code: CIV
- Zone(s): SCoR
- Division(s): Guntur
- Classification: E

Services
Preceding station	Indian Railways	Following station
Tenali towards ?	Tenali–Repalle branch line	Zampini towards ?
Route map
Location
- Location within India Location within Andhra Pradesh

Chinnaravuru railway station, Tenali (station code: CIV) is an Indian Railway station, located in Chinaravuru, Tenali of Guntur district in Andhra Pradesh. It is situated on Tenali–Repalle branch line and is administered by Guntur railway division of South Coast Railway zone. It is classified as an E-category station in the division.

== History ==
The Tenali–Repalle branch line, constructed by Madras and Southern Mahratta Railway, was opened in 1916. It is a train station located in Tenali city at distance of 6 km from Tenali Junction railway station. The trains from Tenali junction to Repalle pass through this station.

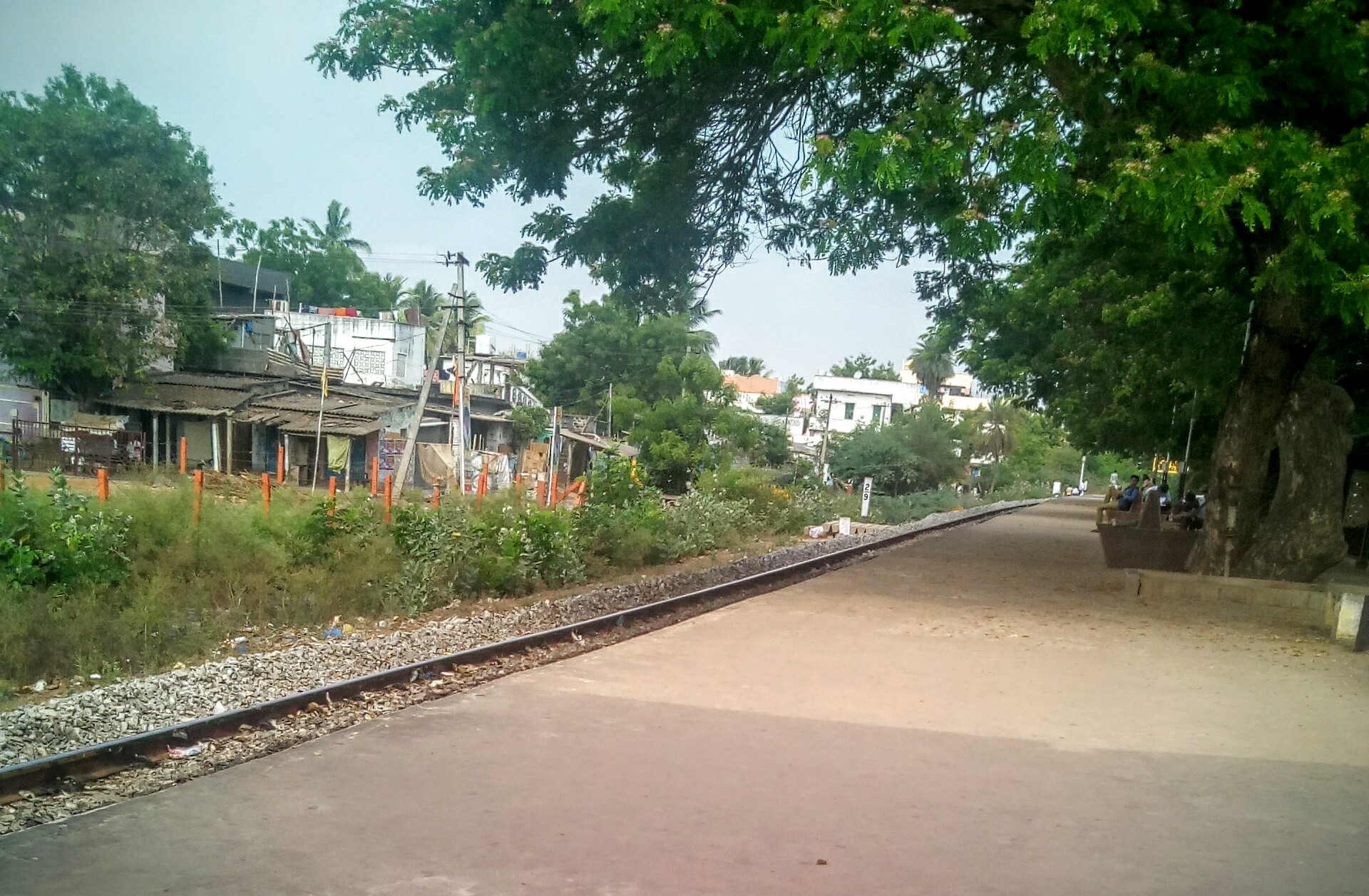
Railway platform of Chinnaravuru station

== Structure and amenities ==
The station has rooftop solar panels installed by the Indian railways, along with various railway stations and service buildings in the country, as a part of sourcing 500 MW solar energy.

== See also ==
- List of railway stations in India
