= Tenali Municipality =

Local self-government in Tenali, Andhra Pradesh, India

- Formation: 1909
- Founder: Natural
- Founded at: Tenali
- Type: Governmental organisation
- Legal status: Local government
- Purpose: Civic administration
- Headquarters: Tenali
- Location: Tenali, Guntur district, Andhra Pradesh, India
- Official language: Telugu
- Chairman: Thotakura Venkata Ramana Rao
- Main organ: Committee
- Website: tenali.cdma.ap.gov.in

Tenali Municipality is the local self-government in Tenali, a city in the Indian state of Andhra Pradesh. It is classified as a Selection grade municipality.

== History ==
The municipality was formed in 1909 and was upgraded to special grade municipality in 1965.

== Administration ==
The municipality is spread over an area of 17.00 km^{2} (6.56 mi^{2}) and comprises Tenali, Pinapadu and Chinaravuru. The present municipal commissioner of the city is B Seshanna . The present municipal chairman is Thotakura Venkata Ramana Rao.

Wards composition

Tenali municipality has a total of 40 election wards. The below table shows the composition of municipal wards with unreserved and reserved wards (women, SC's, ST's and BC's).

Type	No. of Wards	Reserved (Women)	Total
General (Unreserved)	9	9	18
BC's	8	6	14
SC's	3	3	6
ST's	1	1	2
Total	21	19	40

== Civic works and services ==
Most of the city residents rely on borewells for water. For the growing usage by the city residents, the Public Health Department and the municipality undertook a water project, which includes the construction of a head water works reservoir opposite VSR and NVR College, six other overhead service reservoirs and a filtration plant. These are supplied with the Krishna River water from Prakasam Barrage at Sitanagaram.

The city municipality implements two-bin garbage collection and also took up sanitation campaigns like, Mana Tenali-It’s people’s creation for hygiene of the people. The total length of roads maintained by the municipality is 172.50 km (107.19 mi).

Projects and infrastructure

The notable Satyanarayana VGTMUDA Lake Park (or Chinaravuru Park) on the outskirts is maintained by VGTMUDA (now CRDA). It is home to many floral varieties and was named after the former municipal chairman, Ravi Satyanarayana.

Tenali is one of the seven municipalities, along with Vijayawada and Guntur Municipal Corporations to be a part of a 15 MW waste-to-energy plant project. It is planned to be set up with the collaboration of the JITF Urban Infrastructure Limited.

== Awards and achievements ==
In 2015, the municipality received Green Leaf Awards 2015 in the category of Best Decentralised Solid Waste Management, which was organised by NGO Sukuki Exnora. In the 6th Plasticon Awards 2012, it was awarded Green City of the country for waste segregation management. The city is one among the 31 cities in the state to be a part of water supply and sewerage services mission known as Atal Mission for Rejuvenation and Urban Transformation (AMRUT). In 2015, as per the Swachh Bharat Abhiyan of the Ministry of Urban Development, Tenali Municipality was ranked 166th in the country.

== See also ==
- List of municipalities in Andhra Pradesh
