= Kancherla palem =

Kancherla Paleam
- Neighbourhood
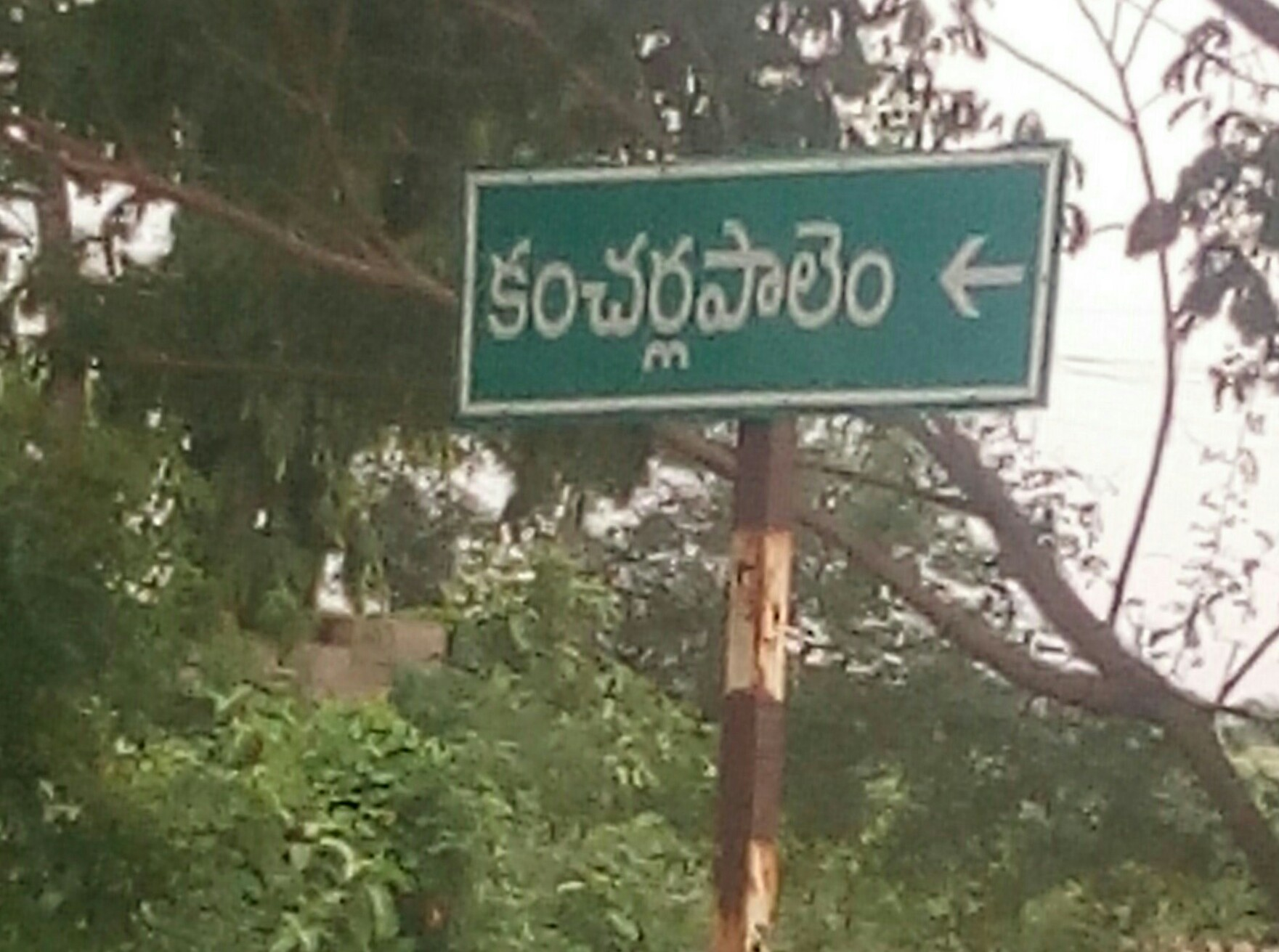
- Interactive map of Kancherla Paleam
- Location in Andhra Pradesh, India
- Coordinates: 16°16′41″N 80°39′01″E
- Country: India
- State: Andhra Pradesh
- District: Guntur

Government
  - Body: Tenali

Languages
  - Official: Telugu
- Time zone: UTC+5:30 (IST)
- Vehicle registration: AP
- Nearest city: Tenali
- Lok Sabha constituency: Guntur
- Vidhan Sabha constituency: Tenali
- Civic agency: Tenali

Kancherla palem is a neighbourhood of Tenali city in Andhra Pradesh, India. It is situated on a state highway between Tenali and Vijayawada, in Guntur district.
