= Venkateswara Temple, Tenali =

Venkateswara Temple, Tirumala
- Sri Venkateswara Swamy Temple
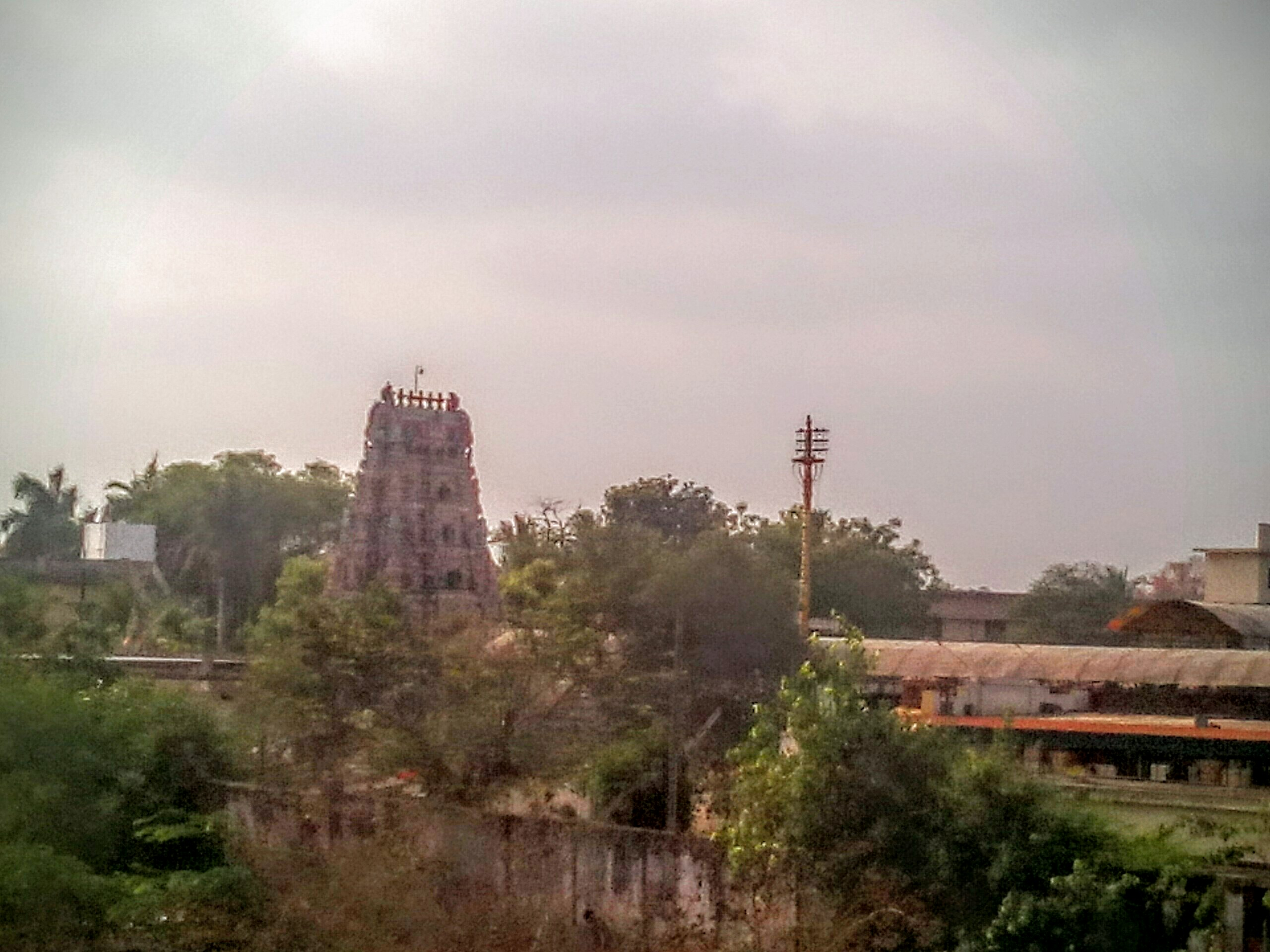
- Vykuntapuram Venkateswara Temple in Tenali

Religion
- Affiliation: Hinduism
- District: Guntur
- Deity: Lord Venkateswara

Location
- Location: Tenali
- State: Andhra Pradesh
- Country: India

Architecture
- Type: Dravidian architecture
- Temple: 1
- Inscriptions: Telugu and Sanskrit

Venkateswara Temple of Vykuntapuram is a vaishnavite temple dedicated to Lord Venkateswara. It is situated in Vykuntapuram of Tenali in Guntur district of the Indian state of Andhra Pradesh. The temple is known with official name as Sri Lakshmi Padmavathi Sametha Sri Venkateswara Swamy Temple, Vykuntapuram.

== History ==
It was developed in the year 1961 and the establishment of the deities in the year 1972. In 1973, the Endowments Department took over the control of the temple.peace of place
