= Kolakaluru railway station =

Railway station in Kolakaluru, India

Kolakaluru

General information
- Location: Kolakaluru, Tenali, Andhra Pradesh; India
- Coordinates: 16.295394°N 80.627728°E
- Operator: Indian Railways
- Line: Tenali–Repalle branch line

Construction
- Structure type: Standard (on ground)
- Accessible: Disabled access

Other information
- Status: Active
- Station code: KLX
- Zone(s): South Central Railway
- Division(s): Vijayawada

Services
Preceding station	Indian Railways	Following station
Duggirala towards ?	Howrah–Chennai main line	Tenali towards ?
Location
- Location within Andhra Pradesh Location within India
- Interactive map

Kolakaluru railway station (station code: KLX) is an Indian Railways station in Tenali of Guntur district in Andhra Pradesh. It lies on the Howrah–Chennai main line and is administered under Vijayawada railway division of South Central Railway zone.

== Classification ==
In terms of earnings and outward passengers handled, Kolakaluru is categorized as a Halt Grade-2 (HG-2) railway station. Based on the re–categorization of Indian Railway stations for the period of 2017–18 and 2022–23, an HG–2 category station earns between ₹5–50 lakh and handles 1–3 lakh passengers.
