= Tenali mandal =

- Mandal
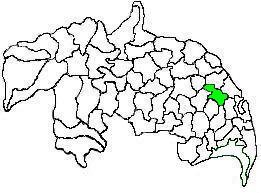
- Mandal map of Guntur district showing Tenali mandal (in green)
- Interactive Map Outlining mandal
- Location in Andhra Pradesh, India
- Coordinates: 16°14′34″N 80°38′24″E
- Country: India
- State: Andhra Pradesh
- District: Guntur
- Headquarters: Tenali

Government
  - Body: Mandal Parishad
  - Tehsildar: G.V.Subba Reddy

Population (2011)
  - Total: 240,031

Languages
  - Official: Telugu
- Time zone: UTC+5:30 (IST)

Tenali mandal is one of the 18 mandals in Guntur district of the Indian state of Andhra Pradesh. It is under the administration of Tenali revenue division, headquartered at Tenali. The mandal is located in Velanadu region, bounded by Pedakakani, Duggirala, Kollipara, Vemuru, Amruthalur, Tsundur and Chebrole mandals.

== History ==
Guntur district was constituted in the year 1904 and Tenali was one of the eight taluks of the district. On 1 July 1909, Tenali taluk was split into Tenali and Repalle taluks. In 1981–82, Tenali taluk was again split into Tenali and Emani taluks. Tenali city taluk was split into Vemuru and Tenali Mandals. Later it was split it into Tenali and Bapatla mandals. On 25 May 1985, mandals were recognised, replacing taluks and firkas.

== Demographics ==
As of 2011 census, the mandal had a population of 240,031, including 118,616 males and 121,415 females, for a sex ratio of 1,024 females per 1,000 males. 21,333 children were in the age group of 0–6 years, of which 10,939 were boys and 10,394 were girls. The average literacy rate stood at 79.89% with 174,711 literates.

Devarapalleseri is the village with the smallest area of all the villages in the district, 11 ha (27 acres). Tenali is the most populated and Nelapadu is the least populated settlement in the mandal.

== Government ==
=== Administration ===
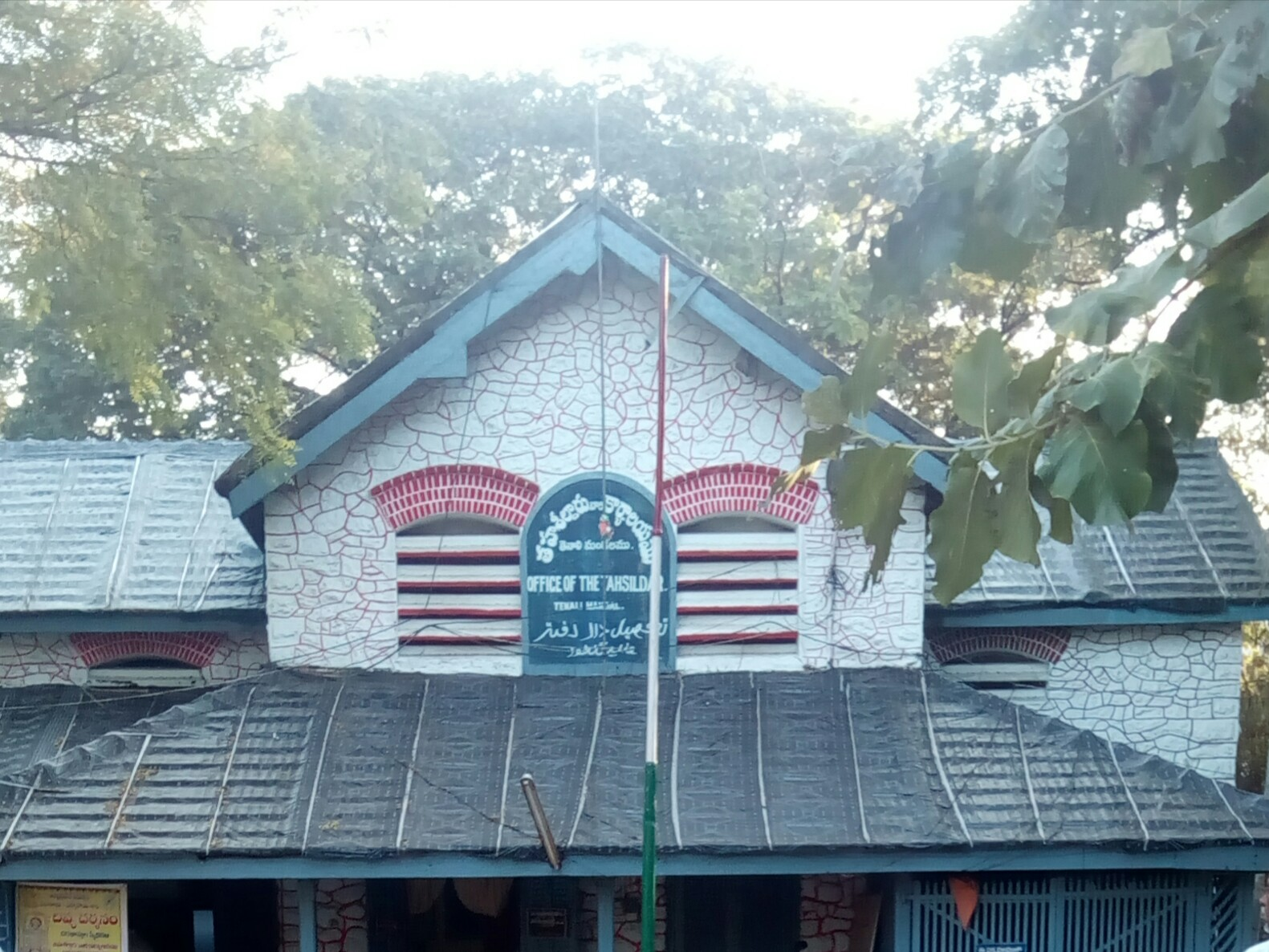
Office of the Tahsildar in Tenali

The mandal also forms a part of the Andhra Pradesh Capital Region under the jurisdiction of APCRDA. It is under the control of a tahsildar; the present tahsildar is G.V. Subba Reddy.

As of 2011 census, the mandal has thirteen villages with one town.

The settlements in the mandal are:

- Angalakuduru (merged in the city)
- Burripalem (merged in the city)
- Chinaravuru (merged in the city)
- Devarapalliseri
- Gudiwada
- Katevaram (merged in the city)
- Kolakaluru
- Nandivelugu
- Nelapadu (merged in the city)
- Pedaravuru (merged in the city)
- Pinapadu (rural) (merged in the city)
- Sangam Jagarlamudi
- Chavavaripalem
- Tenali (M) (converted from town to city by expanding and merging the areas)
- Yerukalapudi
- Chavavaripalem

Note: M: municipality

=== Politics ===
Tenali mandal is one of the two mandals under Tenali assembly constituency, which in turn represents Guntur lok sabha constituency of Andhra Pradesh. It was under Tenali lok Sabha constituency until 2008.

== Education ==
The mandal plays a major role in education for the rural students of the nearby villages. The primary and secondary school education is imparted by government, aided and private schools, under the School Education Department of the state. As per the school information report for the academic year 2015–16, the mandal had more than 32,571 students enrolled in over 204 schools.

== See also ==
- List of mandals in Andhra Pradesh
- Villages in Tenali mandal
