= Pedaravuru =

- Neighborhood
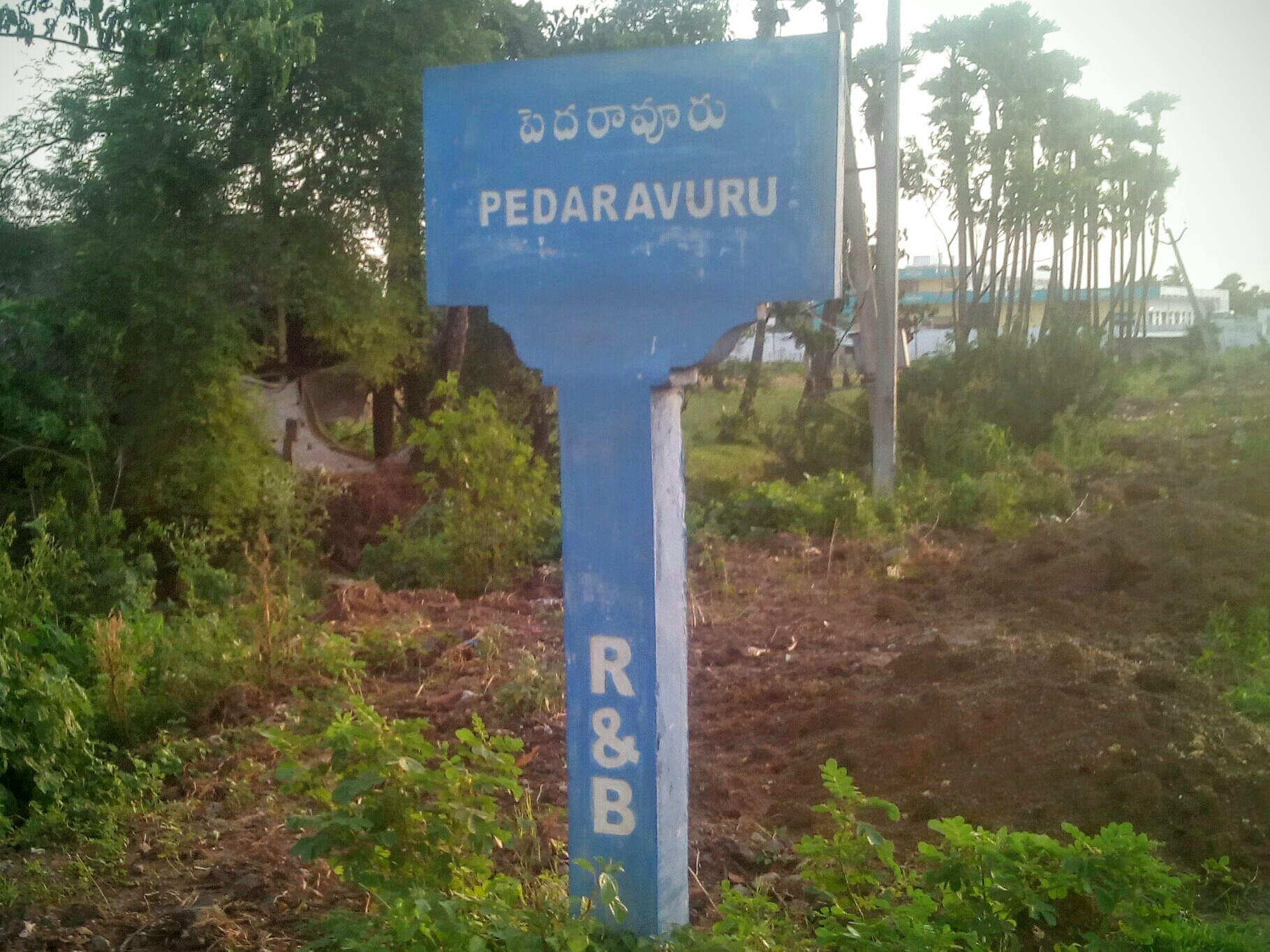
- Pedaravuru village signboard
- Interactive map of Pedaravuru
- Location in Andhra Pradesh, India Pedaravuru (India)
- Coordinates: 16.2090°N 80.6569°E
- Country: India
- State: Andhra Pradesh
- District: Guntur

Area
  - Total: 8.72 km^{2} (3.37 sq mi)
- Elevation: 9 m (30 ft)

Population (2011)
  - Total: 7,088
  - Density: 813/km^{2} (2,110/sq mi)

Languages
  - Official: Telugu
- Time zone: UTC+5:30 (IST)
- Vehicle registration: AP

Pedaravuru is a neighborhood of Tenali in Guntur district of the Indian state of Andhra Pradesh. It is located in Tenali mandal of Tenali revenue division.

== Government and politics ==
Pedaravuru gram panchayat is the local self-government of the village. It is divided into wards and each ward is represented by an elected ward member. The ward members are headed by a Sarpanch. The currently ruling sarpanch in this village is Kaki RamaDevi. It forms a part of Andhra Pradesh Capital Region.

== Economy ==
Small scale occupations produce weaved baskets, bags, mats etc., from water hyacinth.

== Education ==
The primary and secondary school education is imparted by government, aided and private schools, under the School Education Department of the state. The total number of students enrolled in primary, upper primary and high schools in the village are 991.

There are two private, three Mandal Parishad Primary, a ZPHS and other types of schools such as, Madrasa Arabia Kashifululoom.

== See also ==
- List of villages in Guntur district
