= Nandivelugu =

- Neighborhood
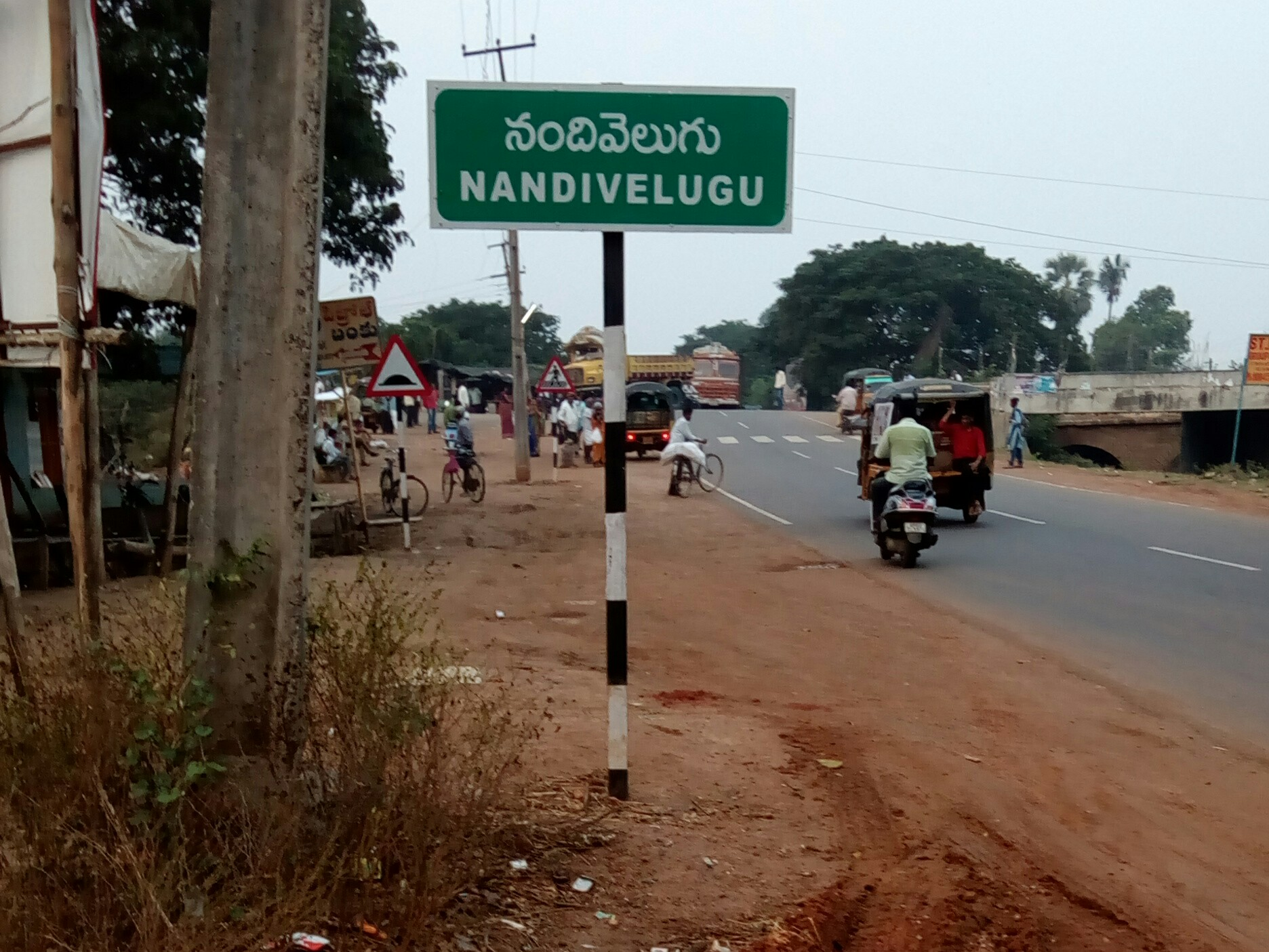
- Nandivelugu signboard
- Interactive map of Nandivelugu
- Location in Andhra Pradesh, India
- Coordinates: 16.2924°N 80.6426°E
- Country: India
- State: Andhra Pradesh
- District: Guntur
- Mandal: Tenali

Government
  - Type: Panchayati raj
  - Body: Nandivelugu Gram Panchayat
  - Sarpanch: Arisetty Sivannarayana

Area
  - Total: 6.70 km^{2} (2.59 sq mi)

Population (2011)
  - Total: 16,880
  - Density: 2,520/km^{2} (6,530/sq mi)

Languages
  - Official: Telugu
- Time zone: UTC+5:30 (IST)

Nandivelugu is an area of Tenali city in Guntur district of the Indian state of Andhra Pradesh. It is located in Tenali mandal of Tenali revenue division. The village became part of the Tenali city in 2011 and now forms part of Andhra Pradesh Capital Region.Nandivelugu Is An Heritage Village Having Its Existence In The History Books. Shiva Temple By Name Agasteswara Swamy Was Unveiled By Rushi Agasteswara. Nandi Opp To This Idol Of Shiva Was A Rich Reserve of Precious Stones. Thieves Stolen The Entire Presious Stones By Breaking The Nandi. The Lighting From The Nandi Is The Reason Behind The Village Name Nandivelugu

== Geography ==
Nandivelugu is located at 16.2924°N 80.6426°E. The village is spread over an area of 4.70 km^{2} (1.81 sq mi).

== Demographics ==
As of 2011 census, Nandivelugu had a population of 6,880. The total population constitutes 3,404 males and 3,476 females —a sex ratio of 1021 females per 1000 males. 620 children are in the age group of 0–6 years, of which 321 are boys and 299 are girls. The average literacy rate stands at 75.18% with 4,706 literates.

== Government and politics ==
Nandivelugu gram panchayat is the local self-government of the village. It is divided into wards and each ward is represented by an elected ward member. The ward members are headed by a Sarpanch.

== Transport ==
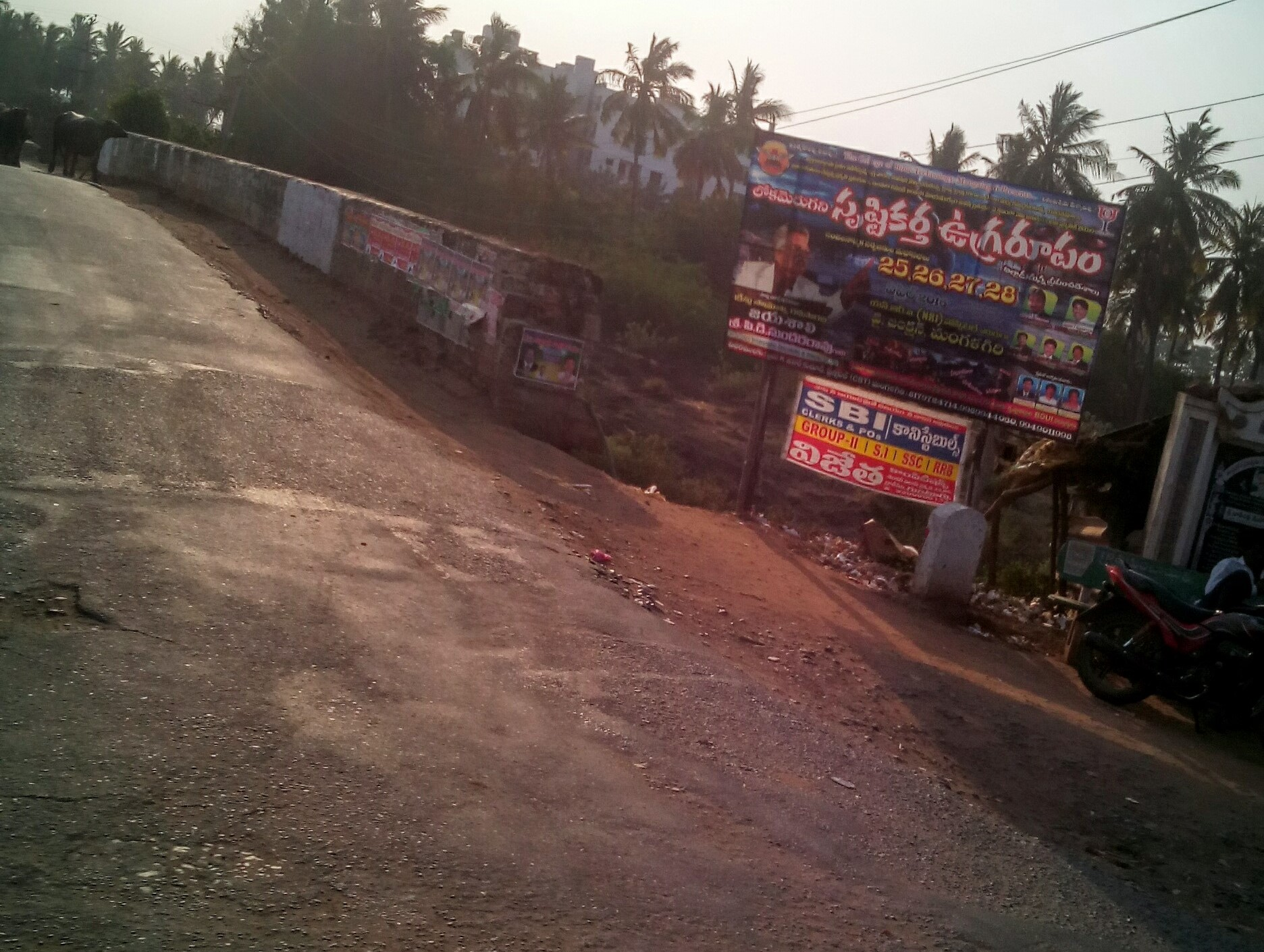
Guntur-Nandivelugu Road at Nandivelugu

Guntur-Nandivelugu Road connects the village with the district headquarters, Guntur and the Tenali–Mangalagiri Road connects it with the urban centers of Tenali and Mangalagiri. The nearest railway station to the village is Kolakaluru, Tenali and the major station is Tenali Junction.

== Education ==
The primary and secondary school education is imparted by government, aided and private schools, under the School Education Department of the state. The total number of students enrolled in primary, upper primary and high schools in the village are 559.

Zilla Parishad High School is a Zilla Parishad funded school, which provides secondary education in the village.

== See also ==
- Villages in Tenali mandal
