= Panchagnula Adinarayana Sastry =

Panchagnula Adinarayana Sastry (1890–1951) was a scholar of Sanskrit and Telugu. He was a follower of the Navya Sahitya Movement and Spoken Telugu Movement led by Gidugu Venkata Ramamoorty. He established "Aryabharathi Granthamala" in 1930.

== Biography ==
Sastry was born in 1890 to Venkateswarlu and Alvelumanga. He wrote many books in Telugu, Sanskrit, Pali and Hindi languages. His notable works are "Jainula mata kathalu" and "Gowthama Nyaya sutralu". These are written in Telugu. He translated "Vatsayana Kamasutralu" from Sanskrit.

== Works ==
- Sthrijataka
- Sri Vemana Yogi Jeevitham (1917)
- Prakrutha grantha kartalu - Prajasevanu.
- Sri Bhadrachala Ramadasu Charitramu.
