= Puranam Srinivasa Sastry =

Indian writer in the Telugu language (born 1953)

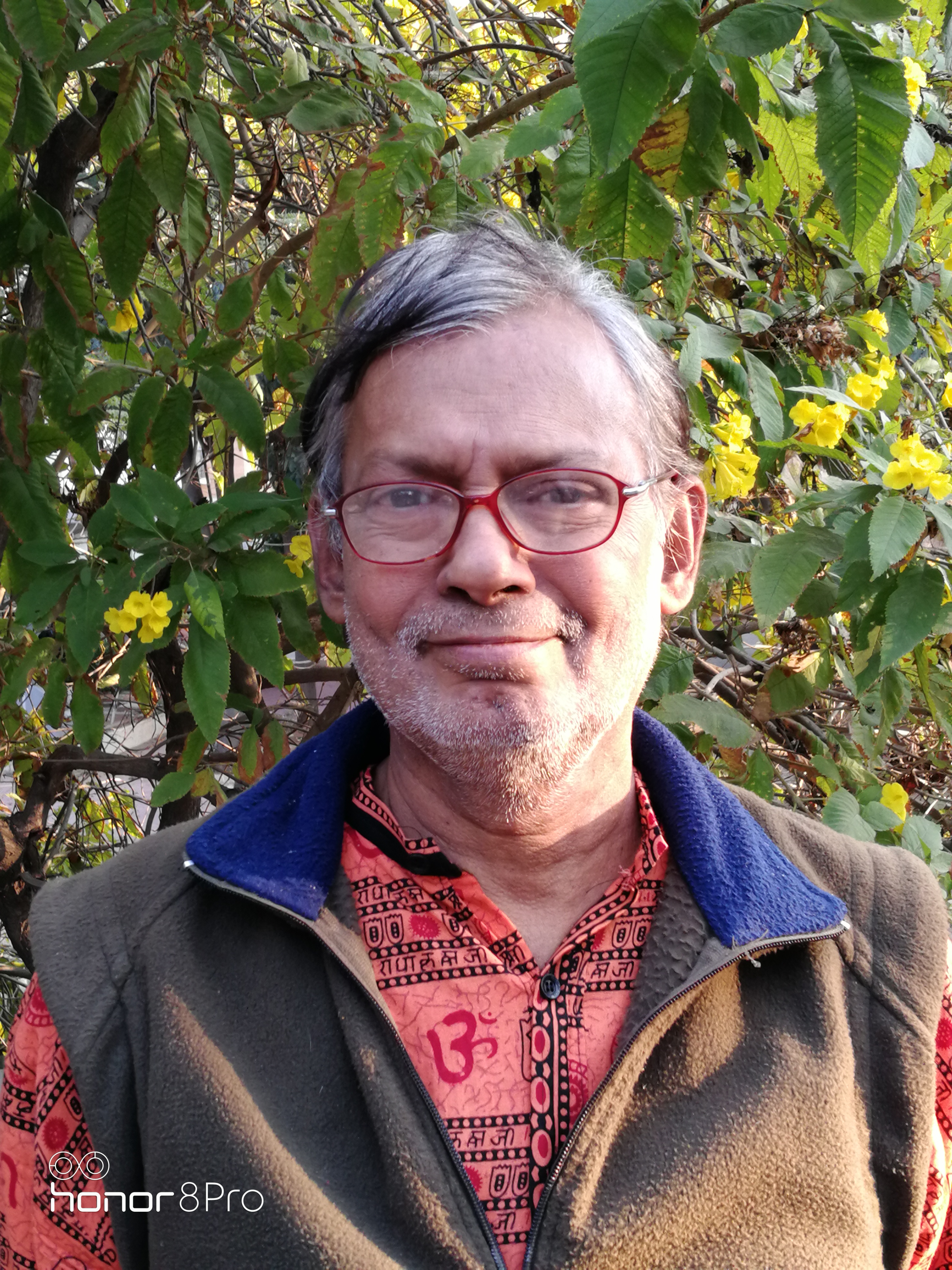
Puranam Srinivasa Sastry was a journalist, short story writer in Telugu.

Puranam Srinivasa Sastry (1 June 1953 – October 22, 2021) was an Indian writer and a senior journalist in the Telugu language. He was also a poet, editor, journalist, YouTuber, translator, columnist, humorist, political analyst, and canvas artist.

== Career ==
He worked at the newspaper Eenadu in the town of Visakhapatnam for a brief period and for Andhra Bhoomi, a Telugu daily, as a chief sub-editor for its Hyderabad edition. He also worked for the Deccan Chronicle, Andhra Bhoomi, Vaartha, Andhra Prabha, Prajasakti and Eevaram. He last worked at Mana Telangana (formerly Visalandhra). Sastry was also a freelance news announcer at All India Radio and co-founder of a Telugu literary and cultural club called Kokilam which is now also a YouTube channel for Literary, Social and Cultural works.

== Literary works ==
He was the author of several books including the psychological thriller – Athanikantha Telusu (English: He knows all), Goodu Chalani Sukham, Preminchaku Jwaram Ostundi and Coffee Ragalu. Ennenno Athmahatyalu and Goodu Chalani Sukham won awards and were translated into Hindi, Sanskrit and Kannada. He also wrote under the pen-names Srisaa, Puranam Srisaa, and P.S. He was interviewed by Gollapudi Maruthi Rao for Vandella Kathaku Vandanalu program aired in HMTV. More than 50 stories of his are stored in the prestigious Katha Nilayam. Click here for the direct link to Srisaa's works.

Some of his works were also published on online magazines Sanchika.

== Personal life ==
Sastry married Suseela in 1979 and had three children.
