= Sosale Garalapury Sastry =

Sosale Garalapury Sastry (November 1899 – 22 September 1955) was an Indian industrial chemist known for his work on the manufacture of sandalwood soap through the establishment of the Mysore soap factory in Bangalore. This earned him the nickname of Soap Sastry. He also served as a director of industries and commerce in Mysore State.

Sastry was the son of an eminent Sanskrit scholar Sosale Ayya Sastry and was educated at Central College, Bangalore. Prior to the outbreak of World War I, sandalwood was auctioned by the forest department, exported mainly to Germany where sandalwood oil was distilled. This source of revenue stopped during the war and distillation in Mysore was examined by the director of industries Sir Alfred Chatterton who in turn passed on the problem to the Indian Institute of Science which worked on a steam distillation process. Sastry was sponsored by the Maharaja of Mysore to study soap making. He went to England and obtained an MSc in chemistry at the University College London while also examining industrial soap making and then visited the United States. On his return, the Mysore Soap Factory was founded in 1916 and commercial production began in 1918. The oval design of the soap along with the Sharabha, a mythical elephant-headed lion logo was designed by him. This was scaled up to an industrial scale in 1916 at Bangalore and nearly 6000 pounds of oil were produced per month. The oil was sold mainly for use in perfumery and pharmacopoeia. The soap factory was constructed in 1917 with equipment made by George Scott & Sons. The factory achieved early success and was producing 356 tons of soap in 1935–36.

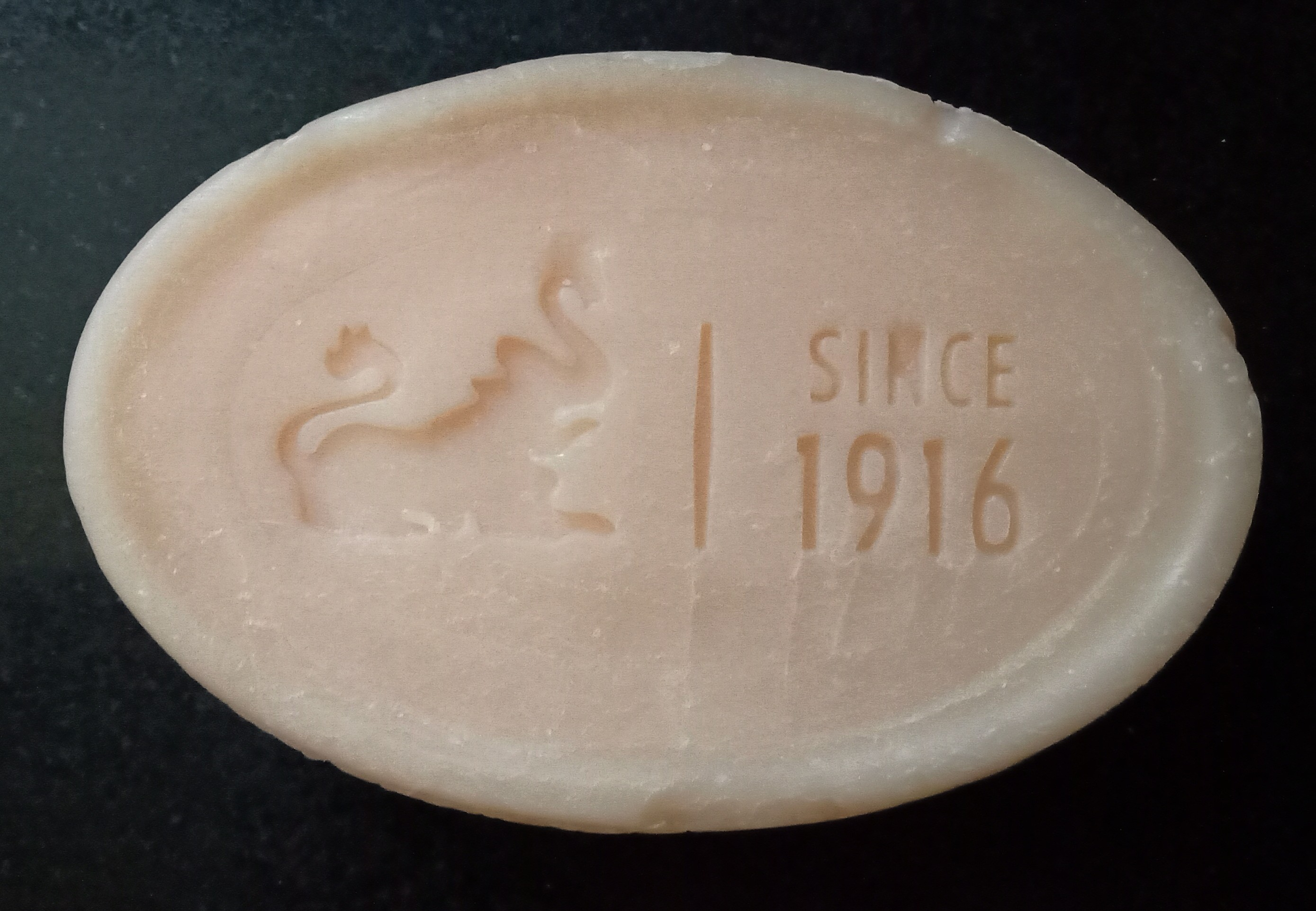
2016 edition of the soap with the Sharabha logo

Sastry was appointed Industrial Chemist in April 1918 and he became in charge of the soap factory on 1 June 1918. He also examined the production of caustic soda and other aromatic distillates. Around 1936, he was appointed director of industries and commerce for Mysore State. He was elected Fellow of the Indian Academy of Sciences in 1934. He also served as a visiting professor at Mysore University. Sastry took a keen interest in Kannada literature and translated two works of Henrik Ibsen to Kannada - Aryaka (The Vikings at Helgeland) and Sutrada Bombe (A Doll's House).

== Publications ==
A partial list of publications includes:

- Sastry, Sosale Garalapury (1916). "XXIX.—Additive compounds of s-trinitrobenzene with heterocyclic compounds containing nitrogen in the ring". J. Chem. Soc., Trans. 109: 270–273. doi:10.1039/CT9160900270. ISSN 0368-1645.
- Sastry, Sosale Garalapury; Ghosh, Brojendra Nath (1915). "CLVIII.—Condensation of aromatic hydroxyaldehydes with diketohydrindene". J. Chem. Soc., Trans. 107: 1442–1449. doi:10.1039/CT9150701442. ISSN 0368-1645.
- Haward, William Arthur; Sastry, Sosale Garalapury (1917). "LXXI.—The uniform movement of flame in mixtures of acetylene and air". J. Chem. Soc., Trans. 111: 841–843. doi:10.1039/CT9171100841. ISSN 0368-1645.
- Sastry, Sosale Garalapury (1916). "XL.—The ignition of mixtures of methane and air and hydrogen and air by means of the impulsive electric discharge". J. Chem. Soc., Trans. 109: 523–529. doi:10.1039/CT9160900523. ISSN 0368-1645.
- Sastry, Sosale Garalapury; Ghosh, Brojendra Nath (1916). "XIX.—Synthesis of ketoindopyranols". J. Chem. Soc., Trans. 109: 175–180. doi:10.1039/CT9160900175. ISSN 0368-1645.
- Sastry, Sosale Garalapury (1915). "CXCVIII.—The catalytic bleaching of palm oil". J. Chem. Soc., Trans. 107: 1828–1831. doi:10.1039/CT9150701828. ISSN 0368-1645.
