= J. C. M. Sastry =

Physician

Dr. J. Chandra Mouli Sastry M.B.B.S. M.D. D.M. (10 June 1936 – 20 April 2005) was an Indian nephrologist. He was founding professor of nephrology in Christian Medical College, Vellore.

== Early life ==
He was born to Rao Bahadur Rao Saheb J. S. Swamy Sastry and Lakshmikanthamma in Tenali as their third son. He was educated at Tenali Taluk High school, Hindu College and Andhra Christian College. He was graduated M.B., B.S. from Bangalore Medical College. He completed his M.D. in General Medicine from the All India Institute of Medical Sciences, New Delhi.

He joined the Christian Medical College and Hospital, Vellore in 1970 and served until June 1996. He initially worked in the General Medicine department for some time. He moved to the Nephrology Department when it was created in January 1971. When the hospital was recognized for D.M. in nephrology in 1974, he registered for the course and completed it.

Sastry traveled extensively in India and abroad. He was the president of the Indian Society of Nephrology and President of the Indian Society of Organ Transplantation and Chairman of the Southern Chapter of Indian Society of Nephrology.

He died on 20 April 2005 in Hyderabad. He left his wife Anupama, daughter Shailaja and son Srikanth.

The Indian Society of Nephrology has instituted an Oration on his name. It is awarded each year to a senior Indian nephrologist who has contributed significantly to the practice and/or teaching of Nephrology in India.

He started Department of Nephrology at Kamineni Hospital, L.B. Nagar, Hyderabad in year 1997. He trained efficient Nephrologists like, Dr. Kamal Kiran, Dr. K.V. Dakshina Murthy, Dr. Rajesh Sherke, Dr. Akhtural Imam, Dr.M.Venkata Ramana, Dr. S.Renuka, Dr. Kiran Fernandez, Dr. Shobhana G. Nayak, Dr. Anil Kumar B.T, Dr.P. Vikranth Reddy. Under his supervision, around 300 live kidney transplantations, 10 cadaver transplantations, and 2 liver transplantations were performed at Kamineni. He treated about 5,000 patients who suffered with various kidney problems.

== Publications ==
- Renal Failure Following Snake Bite. A Clinicopathological Study of Nineteen Patients, J. C. M. Shastry, Anand Date, R. H. Carman and K. V. Johny, American Journal of Tropical Medicine and Hygiene, 26(5), 1977, pp. 1032–1038.
