= Sastry automorphism =

In mathematics, a Sastry automorphism, is an automorphism of a field of characteristic 2 satisfying some rather complicated conditions related to the problem of embedding Ree groups of type ^{2}F_{4} into Chevalley groups of type F_{4}. They were introduced by Sastry (1995), and named and classified by Bombieri (2002) who showed that there are 22 families of Sastry automorphisms, together with 22 exceptional ones over some finite fields of orders up to 2^{10}.
