= Pinapadu =

Pinapadu (rural)
- Suburb
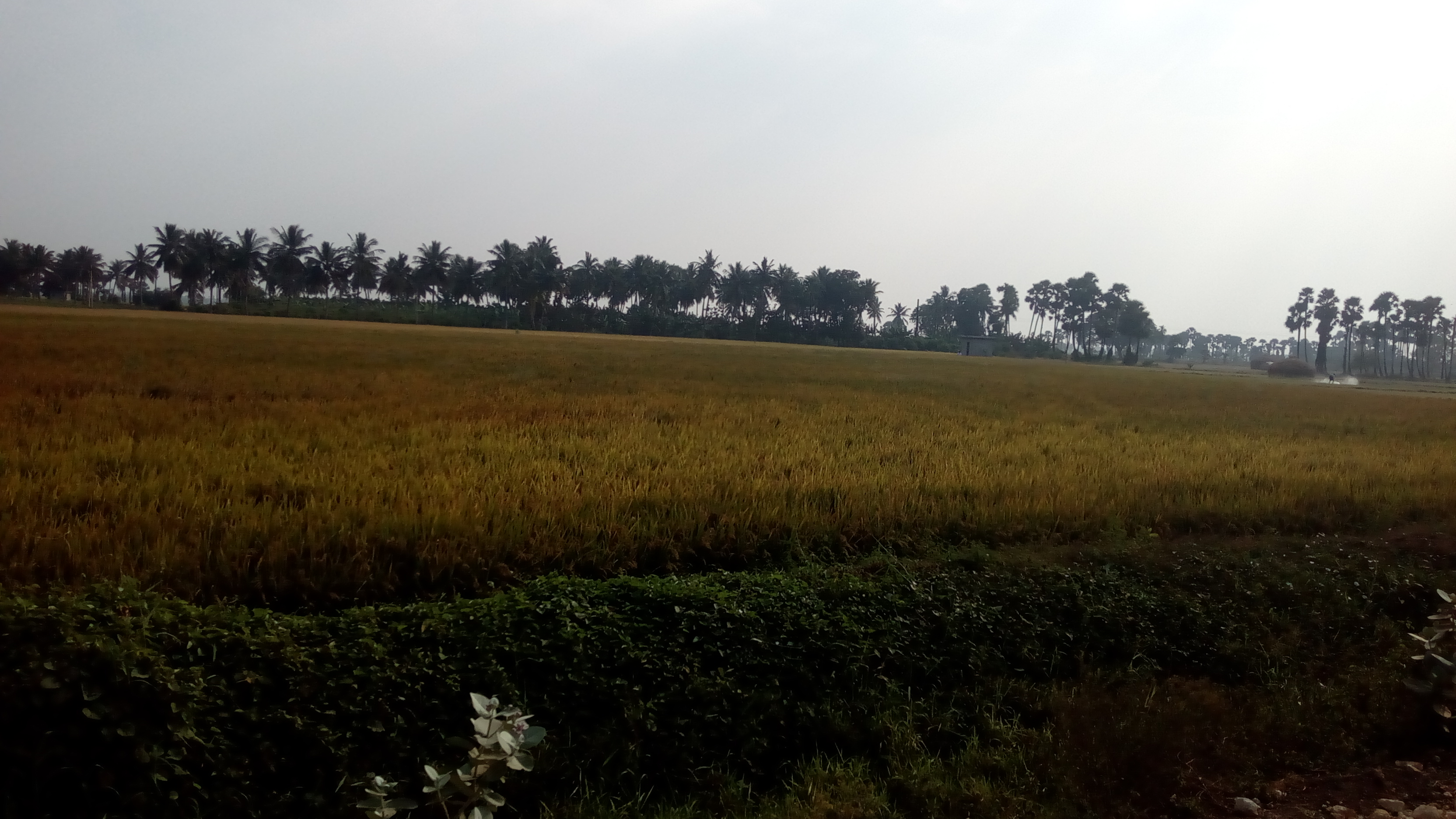
- Agricultural fields in Pinapadu (rural)
- Interactive map of Pinapadu (rural)
- Location in Andhra Pradesh, India
- Coordinates: 16.2122°N 80.6244°E
- Country: India
- State: Andhra Pradesh
- District: Guntur

Area
  - Suburb: 4.02 km^{2} (1.55 sq mi)
- Elevation: 9 m (30 ft)

Population (2011)
  - Rural: 1,908

Languages
  - Official: Telugu
- Time zone: UTC+5:30 (IST)
- PIN: 522 xxx

Pinapadu is a suburb in Tenali, Guntur district of the Indian state of Andhra Pradesh. It is located in Tenali mandal of Tenali revenue division. It is one of the important residential area in Tenali. The major part of Pinapadu was in located in Chenchupeta, which is one of the commercial big residential areas of Tenali. The railway station is located at a distance of 7 km.

== Demographics ==
As of 2011 census, Pinapadu (rural) had a population of 1,908. The total population constitute, 940 males and 968 females —a sex ratio of 1030 females per 1000 males. 173 children are in the age group of 0–6 years, of which 79 are boys and 94 are girls. The average literacy rate stands at 79.60% with 1,381 literates.

== Government and politics ==
Pinapadu gram panchayat is the local self-government of the village. It is divided into wards and each ward is represented by an elected ward member. The ward members are headed by a Sarpanch. It forms a part of Andhra Pradesh Capital Region.

== See also ==
- Villages in Tenali mandal
