= Nelapadu, Tenali mandal =

Nelapadu
- Village
- Interactive map of Nelapadu
- Location in Andhra Pradesh, India
- Coordinates: 16.2924°N 80.6426°E
- Country: India
- State: Andhra Pradesh
- District: Guntur
- Mandal: Tenali

Government
  - Type: Panchayati raj
  - Body: Nelapadu Gram Panchayat

Languages
  - Official: Telugu
- Time zone: UTC+5:30 (IST)

Nelapadu is a village in Guntur district of the Indian state of Andhra Pradesh. The village is located in Tenali mandal of Tenali revenue division.

== Government and politics ==
Nelapadu gram panchayat is the local self-government of the village. The panchayat is divided into wards, each of which is represented by an elected ward member. The ward members are headed by a Sarpanch.

== See also ==
- List of villages in Guntur district
