= VGTM Urban Development Authority =

Agency overview
- Formed: 1978
- Preceding agency: Andhra Pradesh Capital Region Development Authority
- Dissolved: 2020
- Type: Urban Planning Agency
- Jurisdiction: Government of Andhra Pradesh
- Headquarters: Vijayawada; 16°30′30″N 80°38′30″E
- Parent agency: Government of Andhra Pradesh
- Website: VGTMUDA

VGTM Urban Development Authority (abbreviated as VGTM–UDA) (also known as Vijayawada Guntur Tenali Mangalagiri Urban Development Authority) is an urban planning agency in the Indian state of Andhra Pradesh. It was formed in the year 1978 and covers Vijayawada, Guntur, Tenali, Mangalagiri and its surrounding areas.

== Jurisdiction ==
VGTM–UDA is spread over an area of 1,954 km^{2} (754 sq mi) and was expanded to 7,063 km^{2} (2,727 sq mi) in 2012. The region constitute thirteen urban local bodies, three municipal corporations (Vijayawada, Guntur, Mangalgiri&Tadepalli) and eight municipalities (Gudivada, Nuzvid, Jaggayyapet, Tenali, Sattenapalli, Ponnuru, YSRTadigadapa, Kondapalli) and two Nagar panchayats (nandiagam, Vuyyuru).

== Defunct ==
It was dissolved to form a new authority in the name of Andhra Pradesh Capital Region Development Authority.

== Chairmans ==
VGTM-UDA Chairman's
Sno.	Chairman	Party	Constituency	Term start	Term end
1.	V.Srinivas Reddy	INC	Guntur	2013	2014
2.	M.Vishnu	INC	Vijayawada	2004	2007
3.	K.Saradha	TDP	Guntur	2000	2004
4.	D.V.Balavardhanrao	TDP	Gannavaram	1996	2000
5.	K.Ramarao	INC	Tiruvuru	1994	1996
6.	T.Premnath	TDP	Vijayawada	1989	1989
7.	N.Gandhi	TDP	Vijayawada	1987	1989
8.	U.V.Pandurangarao	TDP	Guntur	1985	1987
9.	M.S.S.Koteswararao	TDP	Mangalagiri	1983	1985
10.	G.Siris Raju	INC	Vijayawada	1981	1982
11.	V.Naghabhusanam	INC	Guntur	1978	1980
