= Tenali =

Tenali Andhra Paris
- Town
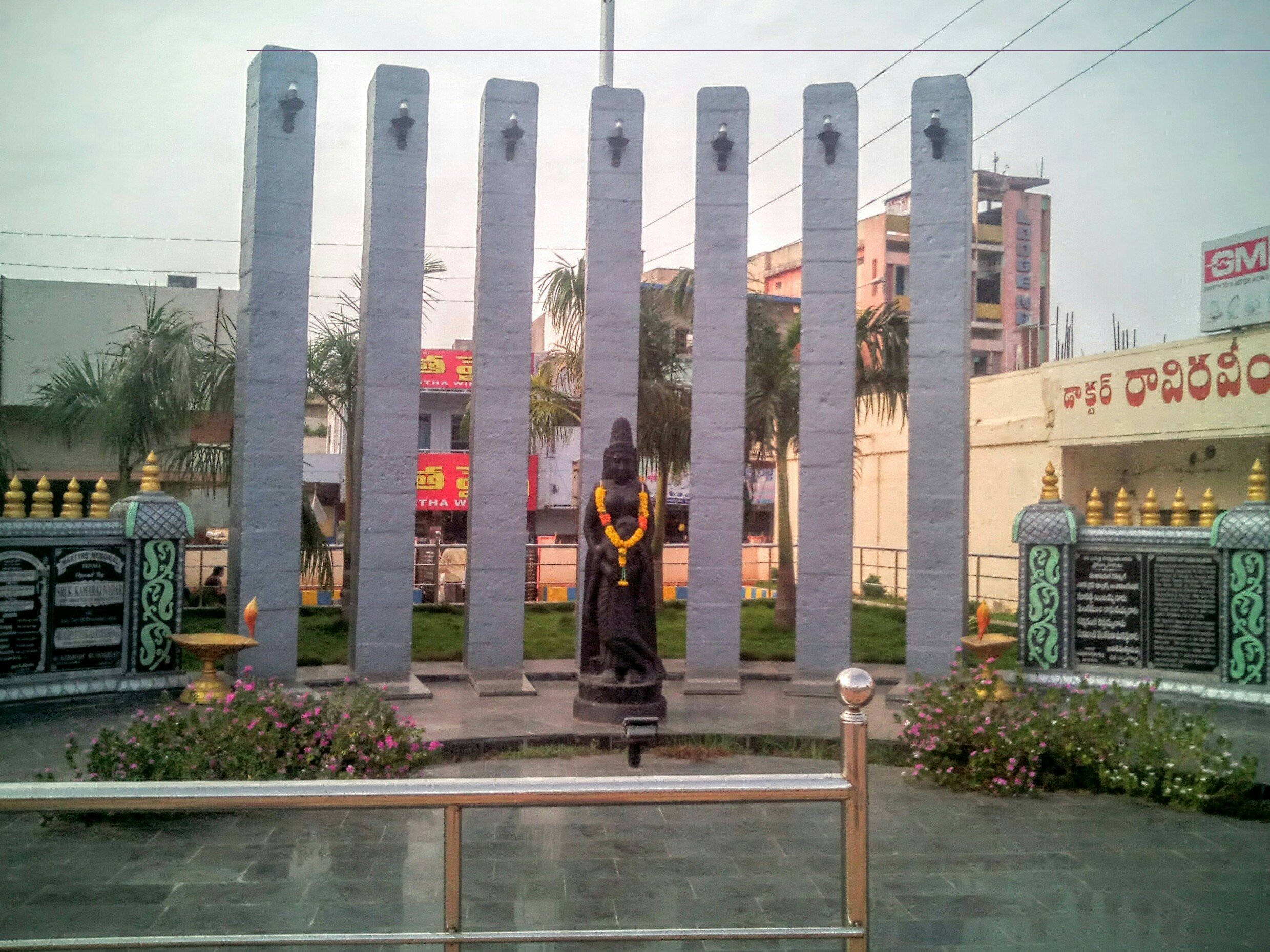
- Ranarang chowk
- Etymology: Teravali
- Nickname: Andhra Paris
- Location in Andhra Pradesh, India
- Coordinates: 16.239°N 80.645°E
- Country: India
- State: Andhra Pradesh
- District: Guntur
- Incorporated (town): 1909
- Wards: 40

Government
  - Type: Mayor-council
  - Body: Tenali Municipality
  - Mayor: TDP
  - Municipal Commissioner: Rama Appala Naidu
  - MLA: Nadendla Manohar
  - MP: Chandra Sekhar Pemmasani

Area
  - Total: 31.56 km^{2} (12.19 sq mi)
- Elevation: 13 m (43 ft)

Population (2011)
  - Total: 164,937
  - Rank: 18th (in state)
  - Households: 67,890

Literacy
  - Literates: 124,618
  - Literacy rate: 87.75%

Languages
  - Official: Telugu
- Time zone: UTC+5:30 (IST)
- PIN: 5222xx, 522201, 522202, 522307
- Telephone code: +91–8644
- Vehicle registration: AP-39, 40
- Website: tenali.cdma.ap.gov.in

Tenali is a town in Guntur district of the Indian state of Andhra Pradesh. It is a municipality, and the headquarters of Tenali mandal and Tenali revenue division. The town is renowned for art, culture, drama, and hence, it is called "Andhra Paris". It is one of the twelve urban local bodies in Andhra Pradesh Capital Region and the twelfth most populous town in the state, with a population of 199,345 as of 2011. Tenali town is also part of Andhra Pradesh Capital Region Development Authority (APCRDA).

Tenali Rama, one of the jesters and eight poets of the early 16th century Vijayanagara ruler Krishnadevaraya, hailed from Tenali.

== Etymology ==
The word Tenali is originated from Teravali. Local lore states that the word is a misnomer of Tella Naali, meaning White Naali tree. The white colour bark is an uncommon occurrence of Holoptelea integrifolia(Indian Elm), which is found in abundance around the town.

Three canals of the Krishna River flow through Tenali town, making it a part of the rice bowl of Andhra Pradesh, resembling Paris, where three canals pass through the town. Hence Tenali is affectionately called "Andhra Paris". In 2011 the town limits were expanded by many kilometers. The expansion included the villages of Angalakuduru, Nandivelugu, Kolakaluru, Pinapadu and Burripalem.

== History ==
The Andhra–Satavahana dynasty ruled the region around the present town from 225 B.C. to 225 A.D. The relics found in the excavations around Tenali reveal the existence of Jainism One such example is the inscription in Ramalingeswara temple, dating back to the 16th century AD.

== Geography ==
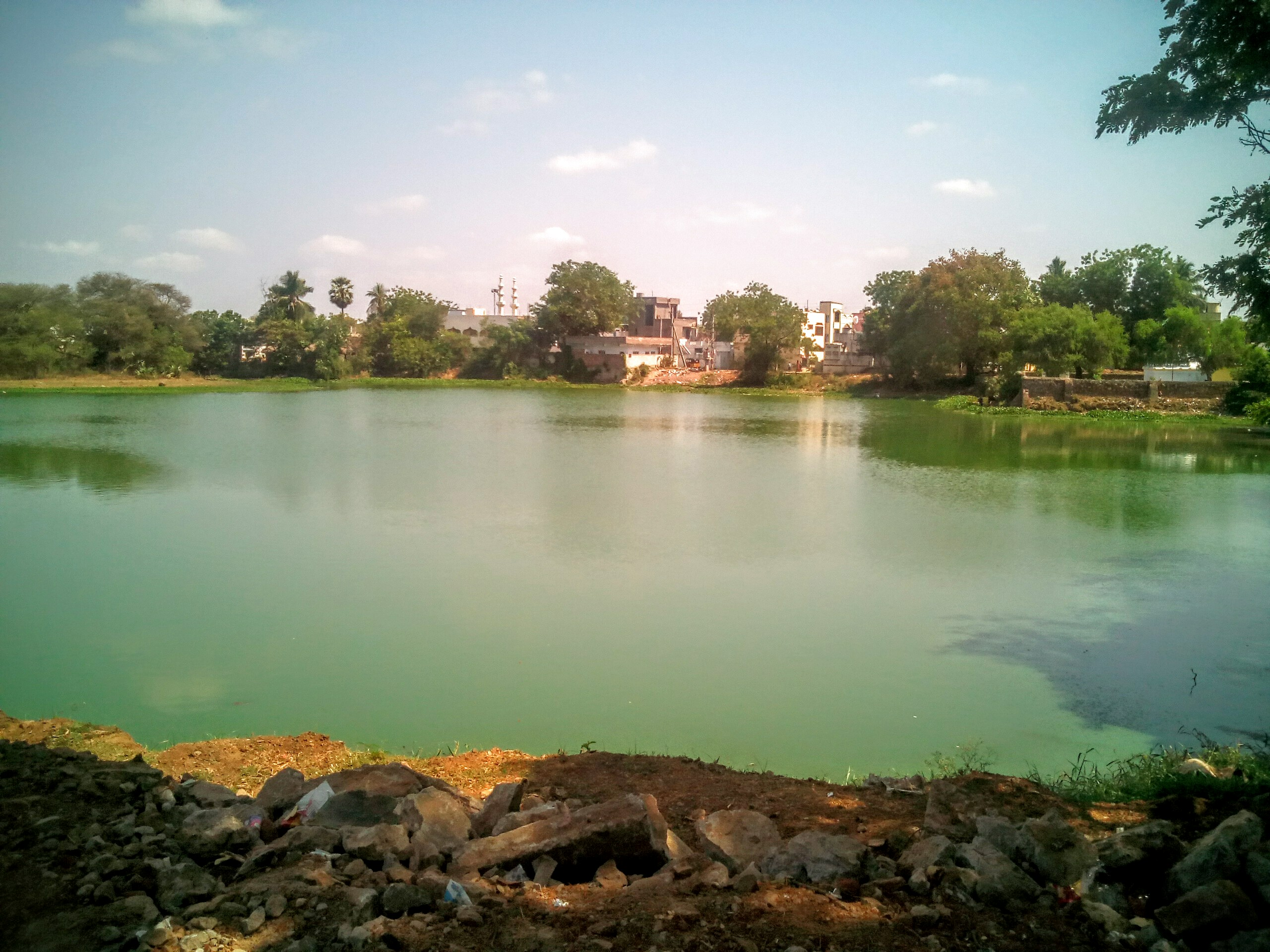
A pond at Pinapadu area of Tenali

Tenali is situated at 16.239°N 80.645°E, on the southern deltaic region of Krishna River. The town is spread over an area of 29.56 km^{2} (11.41 mi^{2}). It lies at an average altitude of 13 metres (43 ft) above mean sea level. This town has no National or State Highway passing through it. The East canal, the Nizampatnam canal and the West canal flow through the town, which originates from Krishna River. The region around the town forms a part of Western Delta System of Krishna river. The area is covered by Alluvium and the main soil varieties are Red and Black.

Climate

Tenali has a tropical wet and dry climate (Köppen Aw). The average annual temperatures range from a high of 33.3 °C (91.9 °F) to a low of 24.2 °C (75.6 °F). May is the hottest and December is the coolest months of the year. The town receives maximum rainfall due to the onset of southwest monsoon season from June to October. The annual precipitation averages 1,017 millimetres (40 in) with the month of August being the highest with 202 millimetres (8 in) and January being the lowest with 1 millimetre (0 in).

== Demographics ==
Religion in Tenali (2011)
Hinduism	83.76%
Islam	13.11%
Christianity	1.94%
Others (incl.unclassified and religion not stated)	1.19%

Historical population
Year	Pop.	±%
1971	55,589	—
1981	119,257	+114.5%
1991	149,726	+25.5%
2001	193,756	+29.4%
2011	222,895	+15.0%

As of 2011 census of India, there were 43,593 households with a population of 164,937. It comprises 81,427 males, 83,510 females and 14,340 children (age group of 0–6 years). The average literacy rate stood at 82.75% with 124,618 literates, of which males were 164,467 and females were 160,151. There are a total of 60,756 workers and 6,238 non–workers. The number of households in 74 slums (37 notified and 7 non–notified) were 18,958 and the total slum population was 75,831.

=== Language and religion ===
Telugu is the most spoken language with a total of 142,085 native speakers, followed by 19,923 Urdu speakers. A significant minority speak Hindi, Marathi and Bengali. The religious population constitute 138,156 Hindus (83.76%), 21,619 Muslims (13.11%), 3,206 Christians (1.94%) and 1,355 (0.82%) not stating any religion.

== Government and politics ==
=== Civic administration ===
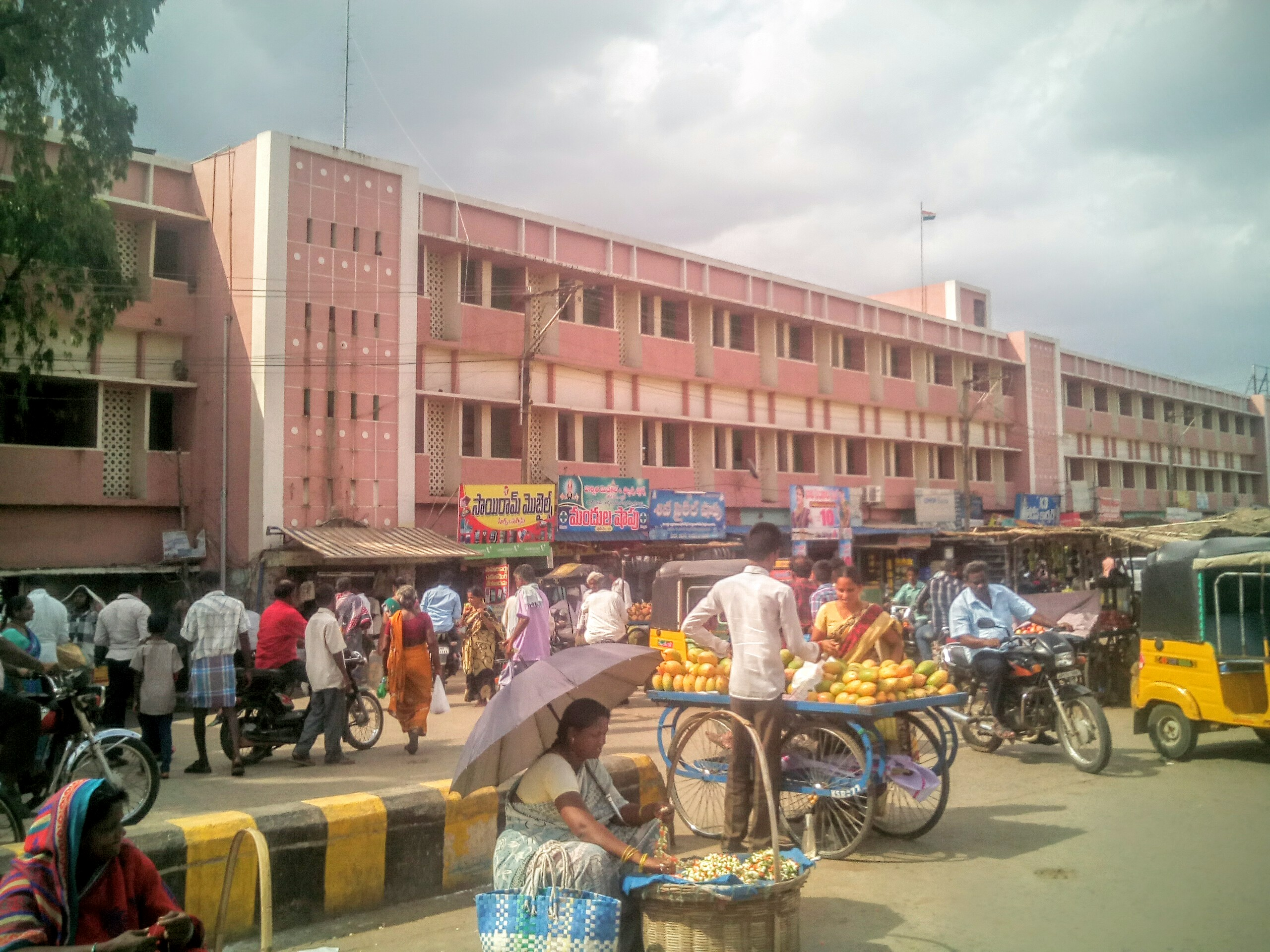
Tenali municipal office

The Tenali Municipality is the seat of local government and the Tenali municipal council is the legislative body. It was constituted in 1909 and is classified as a special grade municipality. The jurisdiction of the civic body is spread over an area of 16.63 km^{2} (6.42 mi^{2}). It has a total of 70 election wards: 27 unreserved and 43 reserved. The wards are reserved 4 for SCs, 12 for STs and 24 for BCs. Each ward is represented by a ward member and the wards committee is headed by a Chairperson. The present Municipal Commissioner of the town is Venkata Krishna. The municipality of the town has received several awards, such as the Green Leaf Award 2015 for Best Decentralised Solid Waste Management and Green City of the country for waste segregation management.

The town is represented by Tenali Assembly constituency in the state legislative assembly. The assembly segment forms a part of Guntur Lok Sabha constituency, which represents the lower house of Indian Parliament. The present MLA from Tenali is Mr. Nadendla Manohar. Currently, Mr. Nadendla is serving as the Minister of Food and Civil Supplies and Consumer Affairs.

=== Public utilities ===
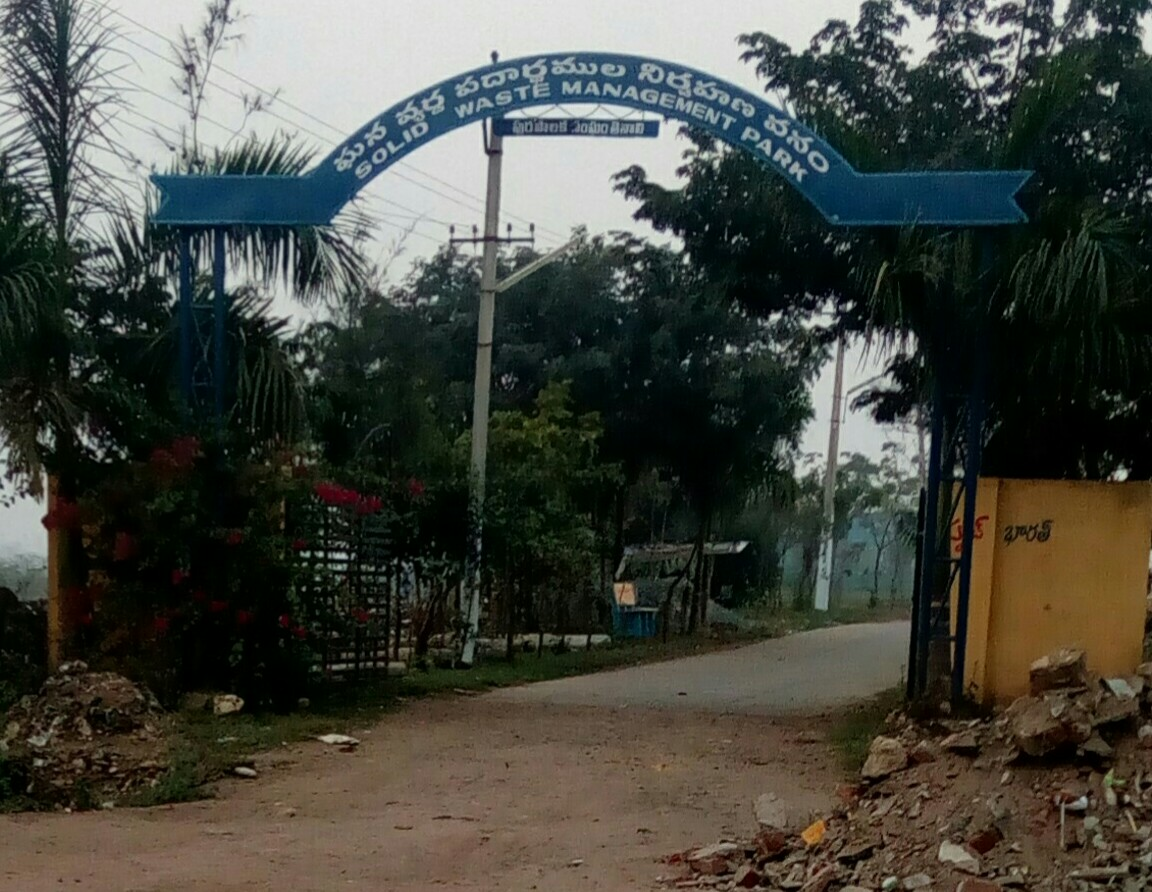
Solid waste management park in the outskirts of Tenali

The municipality oversees civic needs, such as water supply, sewerage, roads, and parks, and is included in the Atal Mission for Rejuvenation and Urban Transformation. The town residents rely on borewells, overhead reservoirs, and a filtration plant for daily water needs, which mainly draws water from the Krishna river of Prakasam Barrage. The town municipality implements two-bin garbage collection, sanitation campaigns like Mana Tenali – It's people's creation for hygiene of the people, ban on plastic bags etc.

== Economy ==
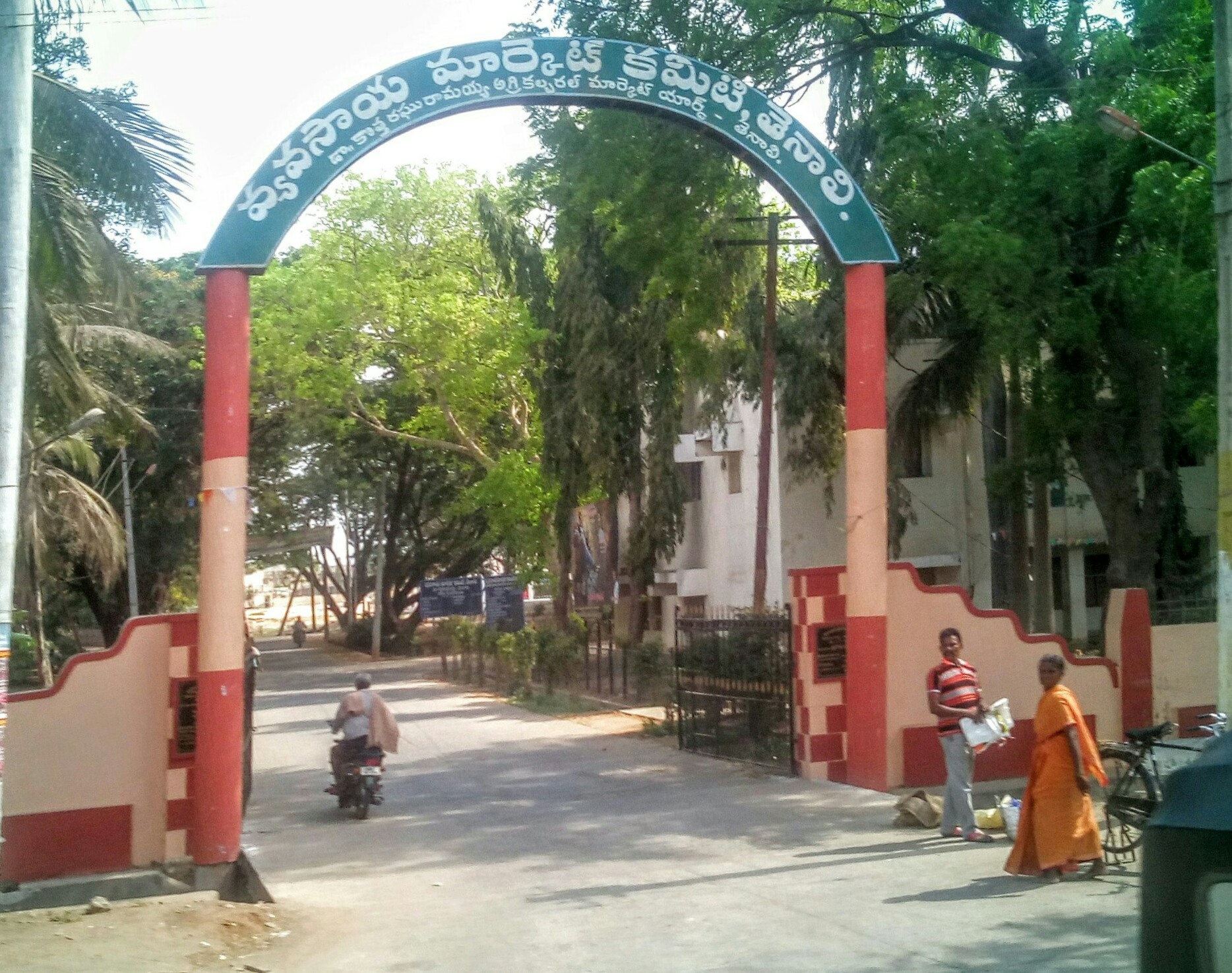
Kotha Raghuramaiah Agricultural Market Yard, Tenali

Tenali thrives on trade and agriculture. Irrigation in the Western Delta, the region in which the town lies, is supported by water from the Krishna river. Paddy is the major crop cultivated, producing on an average of 22–24 bags per acre. Major crops include black gram, maize, and jowar. The Tenali Agriculture Market Yard is used for trading and exporting agricultural products.

The town being a part of the capital region, is recognized as one of the future growth centers. It is also a part of the Tenali–Ponnur growth corridor.

== Culture ==
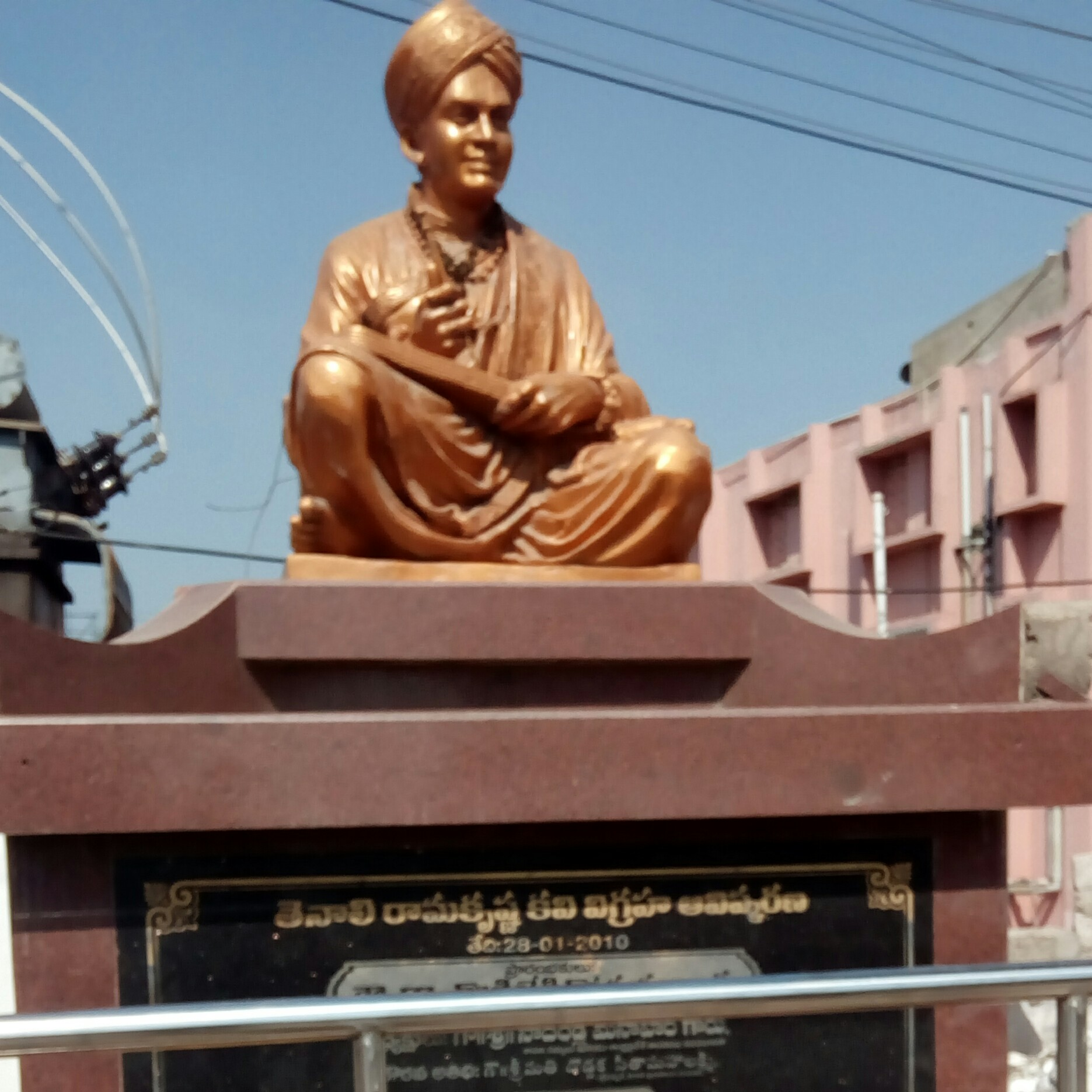
Tenali Ramakrishna statue near Municipal office

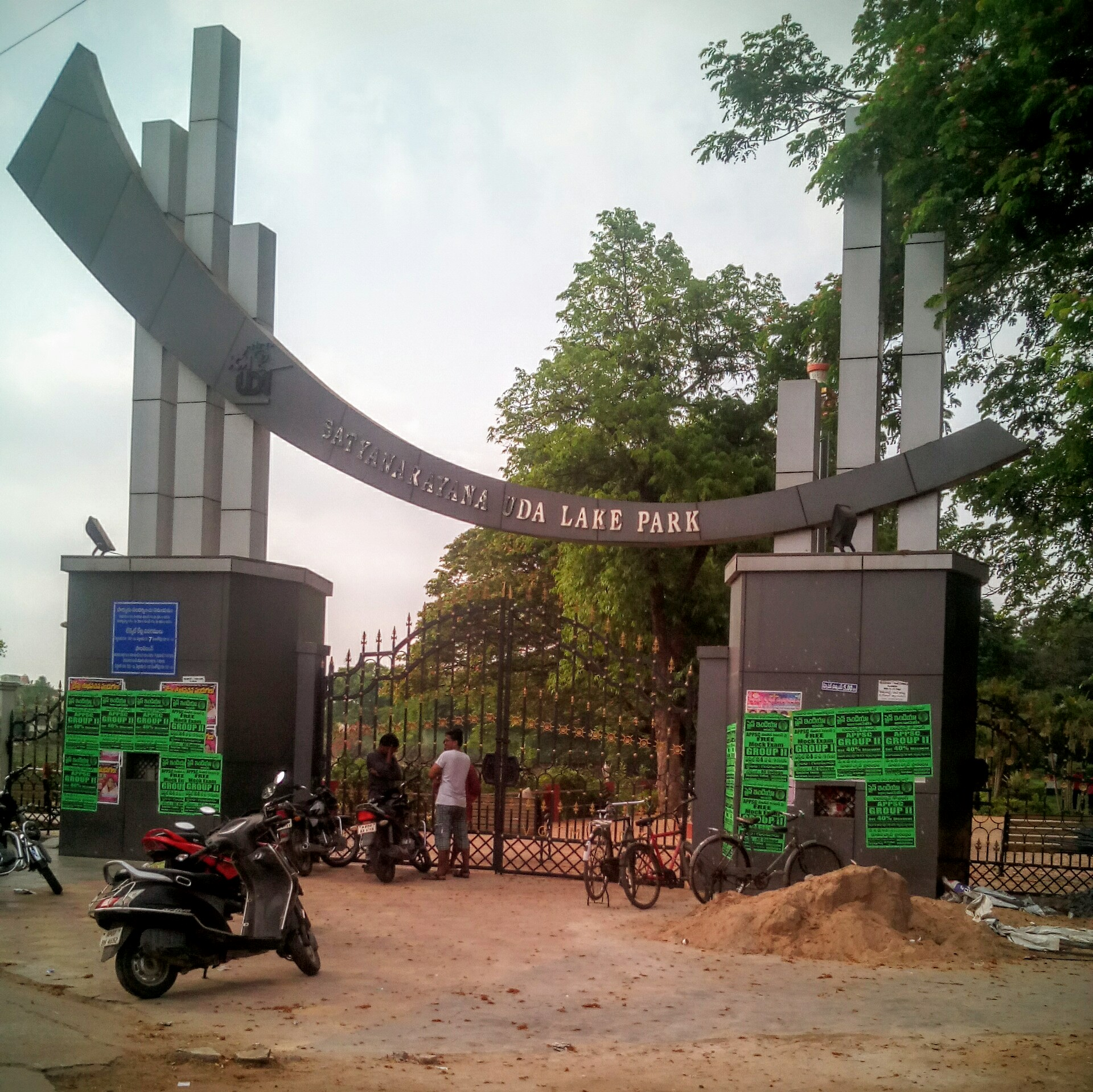
Satyanarayana UDA lake park at Chinnaravuru, Tenali

The town is notable for drama, fine arts, literature and poetry. The iconic Martyr's Memorial at Ranarang Chowk denotes the impact of the town on the Indian freedom struggle during the Quit India Movement. The people of Tenali had responded to Mahatma Gandhi's call and organised a bandh on 12 August 1942. The British police had opened fire on them, and seven people had been killed on the spot, at Morrispeta which later came to be known as Ranarang Chowk. After Independence, seven pillars had been erected in the memory of the seven martyrs, and a statue of Mother India with a baby in her arms had been installed at Ranarang Chowk.

It was the domicile of doyen of several social and revolutionary moments viz. Non Bramin Movement 1920 (Suryadevara raghavaiah Chowdary), Rationalist movement 1940 (Kaviraju Sri Tripuraneni), Radical Humanist Movement 1950 (Sri M.N. Roy) etc.

=== Drama and literature ===
The town has been the host for events such as the formation of the 1929 Andhra Nataka Kala Parishad, the Kanyasulkam play, and cultural fests. Tenali Ramakrishna, one of the eight poets in the court of Sri Krishna Devaraya, hails from Tenali. In the area of modern literature are contributors such as Chakrapani, Gudipati Venkata Chalam, Kodavatiganti Kutumbarao, Tripuraneni Ramaswamy. Furthermore, Nethi Parameswara Sarma wrote the book Nurella Tenali Rangastala Charitra, which translates to 100 years of theater in Tenali.

=== Films ===
Many artists who hail from Tenali and the nearby villages have contributed a major share to the Telugu film industry, such as AVS, Govindarajula Subba Rao (the first Telugu cinema hero), Krishna, Gummadi Venkateswara Rao, Jamuna, Kanchanamala (the first Telugu cinema heroine), Kongara Jaggayya, Rama Prabha, Savitri, Sharada, Siva Parvati and Divya Vani.

=== Cityscape ===
There are various religious worship centers in the town, such as the Vaikuntapuram Venkateswara temple and the Iglesia ni Cristo church. The notable Satyanarayana UDA Lake Park (or Chinaravuru park), named after former municipal chairman Ravi Satyanarayana, is maintained by VGTMUDA (now APCRDA).

=== Food ===
Jalebi is very famous in Tenali town. It is made with jaggery instead of the traditional way with sugar. There is no color added to jalebi. Many parcels are sent abroad on a daily basis.

== Transport ==
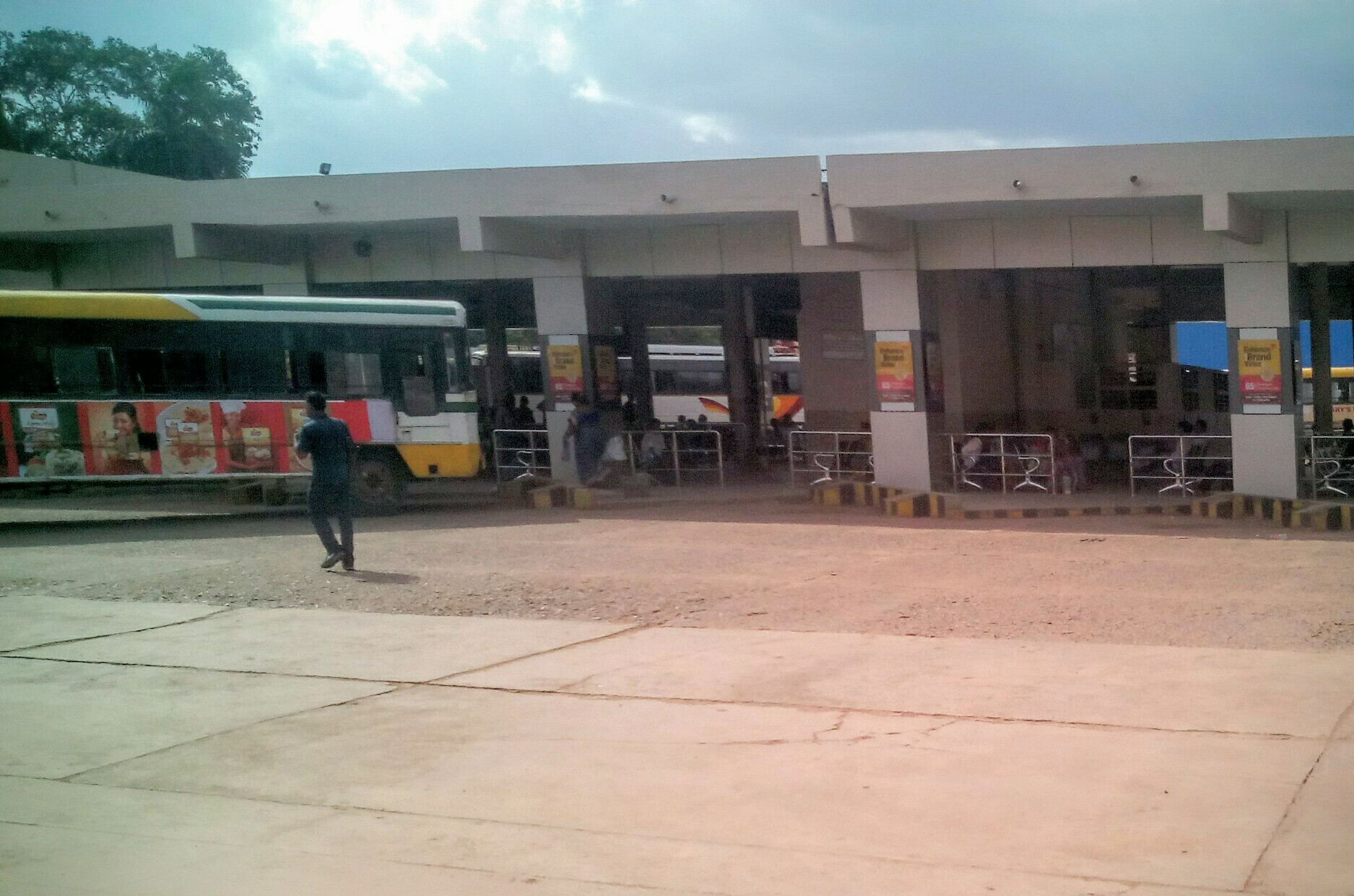
Tenali bus station

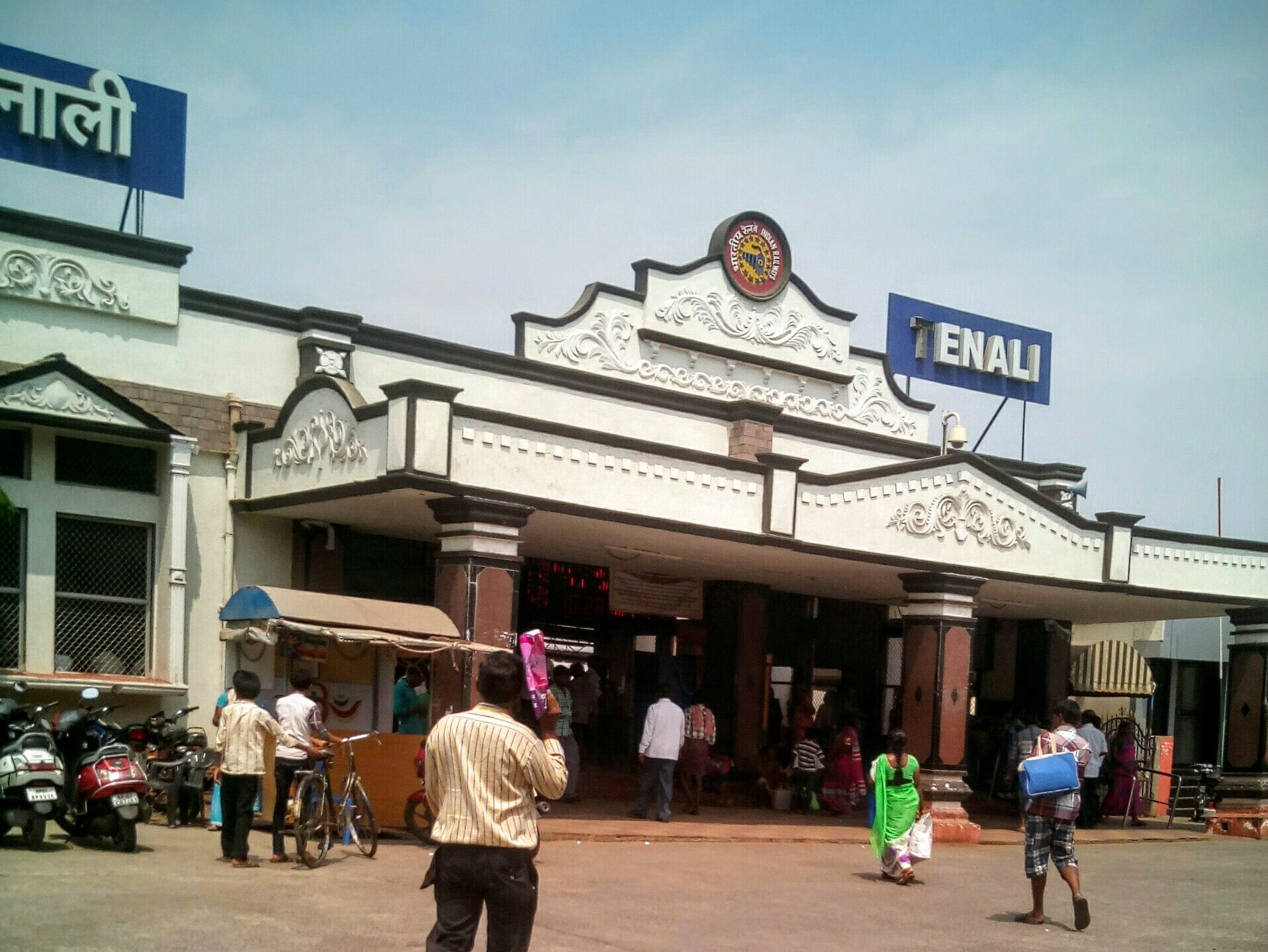
Tenali railway station main entrance

Tenali has a total road length of 410.00 km (254.76 mi). Guntur, Mangalagiri, Burripalem and Ponnur roads are the arterial roads for road connectivity to the town. The road towards Guntur connects with SH 48 at Narakodur. The Tenali–Mangalagiri road, the Tenali–Narakodur road, and the Tenali–Chandole road are a part of the core road network of the district, which connects the town with Mangalagiri, Narakodur and Chandole respectively.

Bus and rail transport are the major modes of public transport for inter district and inter state commuting. The bus transport is provided by Tenali bus station, owned and operated by APSRTC. The station is also equipped with a bus depot for storage and maintenance of buses. It operates bus services to nearby and intrastate destinations.

The town's railway line, the Guntur-Tenali railway line, is an important and short route line that connects Andhra Pradesh and Telangana with Tamil Nadu and Kerala. As it is a junction railway station, the trains are more frequent to any of the cities. Tenali Junction provides rail connectivity to the town and is classified as an A–category station in the Vijayawada railway division of South Central Railway zone. It is an important junction station on the line between the Howrah–Chennai and the New Delhi–Chennai sections, which also connects the Tenali–Repalle branch line and the Guntur–Tenali section.

== Education ==
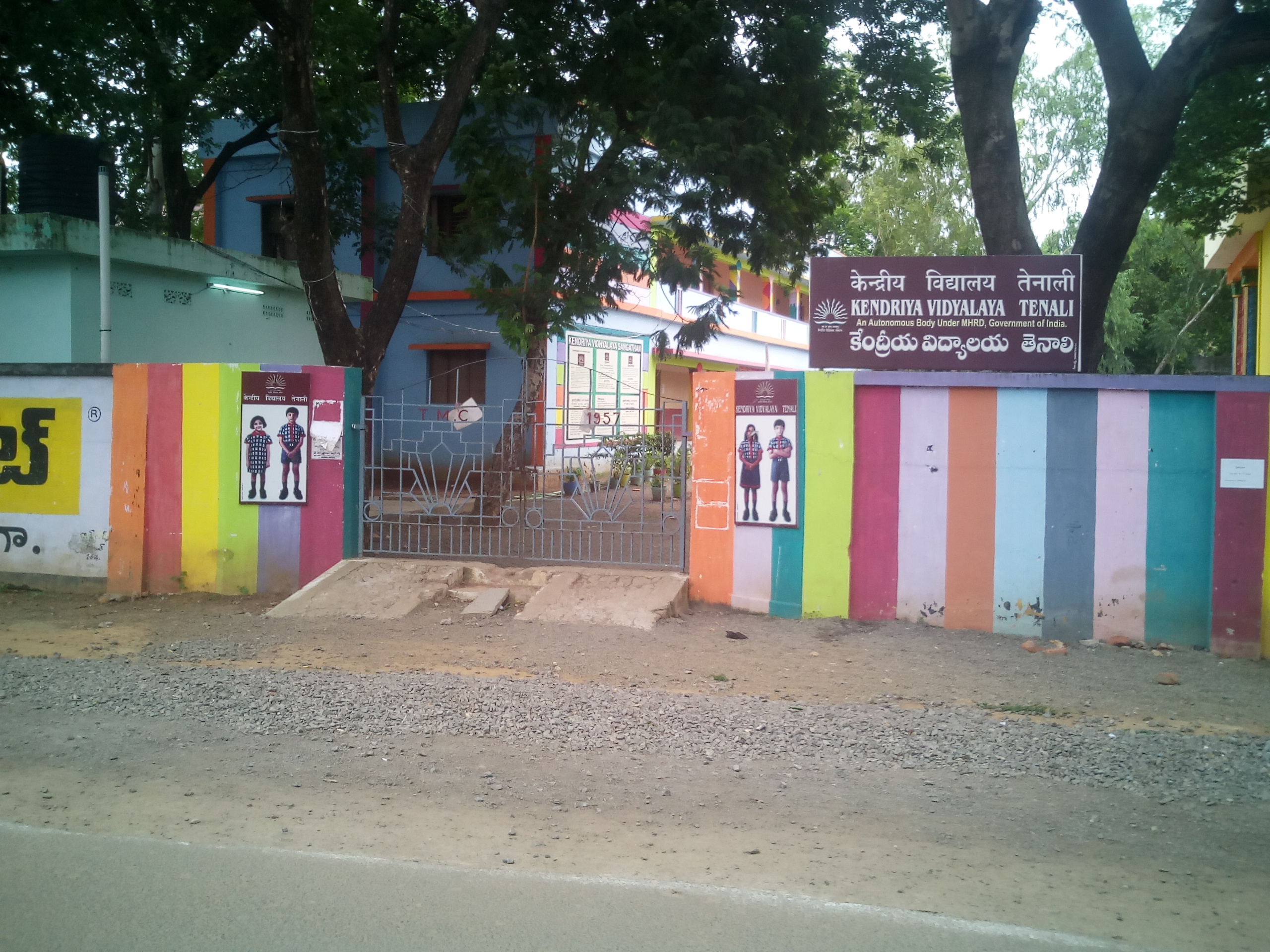
Kendriya Vidyalaya school

The primary and secondary school education is imparted by government, aided, and private schools, under the School Education Department of the state. As per the school information report for the academic year 2015–16, there are a total of 71 schools, comprising 26 private schools, 44 municipal schools, and 1 other type of school. The total number of students enrolled in primary, upper primary and high schools of the town is 11,544.

Sri Vivekananda Central School, Adarsh Public School, Dr.K.K.R Gowtham St. John's Public School, Kendriya Vidyalaya, and Westberry School are some of the public and private schools under CBSE and state boards. Yalavarthy Veda Pathashala, one of the oldest vedic schools founded in 1894, is located in Gandhi Nagar area of the town.

There are 20 private aided junior colleges, such as the Taluk Junior college, the JMJ college for Women, the VSR and NVR college, and the Dr. B. R. Ambedkar Memorial Junior college. Additionally, fourteen unaided junior colleges provide undergraduate education. The JMJ college for women and the VSR and NVR college are the two autonomous colleges under Acharya Nagarjuna University. There are colleges for different fields of study, such as nursing, Government Industrial Training Institute, and other institutes for vocational courses.

== Sports ==
The town has an indoor sports complex for Badminton, Tennis and Volleyball at the Chenchupet area.

Sports personalities from the town include National Senior Chess Silver Medalist International Master CRG Krishna, National Challengers Championship winner and chess master S. Ravi Teja and weightlifter Sai Revathi Ghattamaneni, a gold medalist at Senior Nationals in the 63-kg category.

== Notable people ==
- Tenali Rama, poet and key figure of the Court of Krishnadevaraya of Vijayanagara Empire
- Savitri, known as Mahanati and one of the greatest Indian female actors of all time
- Yalavarthy Nayudamma, popular Scientist who died in the Kanishka airplane bombing
- Nadendla Bhaskara Rao, Politician and former Chief Minister of combined Andhra Pradesh
- Nadendla Manohar, Politician, s/o Nadendla Bhaskara Rao and former speaker of Andhra Pradesh assembly
- J. C. M. Sastry, nephrologist
- Krishna, popular actor and winner of Filmfare Lifetime Achievement Award
- Sobhita Dhulipala, actress and winner of Femina Miss India Earth 2013
- Sarada, winner of 4 Indian national awards for best actress
- Chakrapani, founder of Chandamama and famous film producer

Other notable actors in film industry include Jaggayya,

- Rajyalakshmi,
- Kanchanamala,
- Ashwin Babu,
- Ohmkar,
- Maharshi Raghava,
- Punarnavi Bhupalam,
- Govindarajula Subba Rao,
- Gummadi,
- Priyadarshini Ram,
- Prabha among others.

Eminent academics and poets such as

- Chand Gudi, Roboticist and Entrepreneur (coined Fog robotics)
- Tripuraneni Ramaswamy
- Chalam
- Kodavatiganti Kutumba Rao

== See also ==
- List of cities in Andhra Pradesh
- List of municipalities in Andhra Pradesh
- List of villages in Guntur district
