= Penumarru railway station =

Railway station in Andhra Pradesh, India

Penumarru

General information
- Location: Koteparu Road, Penumarru, Andhra Pradesh; India
- Coordinates: 16.0610°N 80.8043°E
- System: Commuter and Regional rail station
- Owner: Indian Railways
- Operator: Indian Railways
- Line: Guntur–Tenali section
- Distance: 14 km (8.7 mi) from Repalle; 20 km (12 mi) from Tenali
- Platforms: 1 side platform

Construction
- Structure type: Standard (on ground)

Other information
- Station code: PUMU
- Zone(s): SCoR
- Division(s): Guntur
- Classification: F

Services
| Preceding station | Indian Railways | Following station |
|---|---|---|
| Vemuru towards ? | Tenali–Repalle branch line | Bhattiprolu towards ? |
Route map
Location

Penumarru railway station (station code:PUMU) is an Indian Railway station, located in Penumarru of Guntur district in Andhra Pradesh. It is situated on Tenali–Repalle branch line and is administered by Guntur railway division of South Coast Railway zone. It is classified as an F-category station in the division.

== History ==
The Tenali–Repalle branch line, a part of Guntur–Repalel section was constructed by Madras and Southern Mahratta Railway, was opened in 1916.

== Structure and amenities ==
The station has roof top solar panels installed by the Indian railways, along with various railway stations and service buildings in the country, as a part of sourcing 500 MW solar energy.

== See also ==
- List of railway stations in India
