= Vemuru railway station =

Railway station in Vemuru, India

Vemuru

General information
- Location: Vemuru, Bapatla district, Andhra Pradesh; India
- Coordinates: 16°10′39″N 80°44′33″E
- System: Commuter and Regional rail station
- Owner: Indian Railways
- Operator: Indian Railways
- Line: Guntur–Tenali section
- Distance: 14 km (8.7 mi) from Tenali; 20 km (12 mi) from Repalle

Construction
- Structure type: Standard (on ground)

Other information
- Station code: VMU
- Zone(s): SCoR
- Division(s): Guntur
- Classification: E

Services
Preceding station	Indian Railways	Following station
Zampini towards ?	Tenali–Repalle branch line	Penumarru towards ?
Route map
Location
- Location within India Location within Andhra Pradesh

Vemuru railway station (station code:VMU) is an Indian Railways station, located in Vemuru of Bapatla district in Andhra Pradesh. It is situated on Tenali–Repalle branch line and is administered by Guntur railway division of South Coast Railway zone. It is classified as an E-category station in the division.

== History ==
The station got access due to the opening of Guntur–Repalle broad-gauge section via Tenali in the year 1916, when it was under Madras and Southern Mahratta Railway.

== Structure and amenities ==
The station has roof top solar panels installed by the Indian railways, along with various railway stations and service buildings in the country, as a part of sourcing 500 MW solar energy.

== See also ==
- List of railway stations in India
