= Zampini railway station =

Railway station in Andhra Pradesh, India

Zampani

General information
- Location: Zampani, Bapatla district, Andhra Pradesh; India
- Coordinates: 16°11′58″N 80°42′52″E
- System: Commuter and Regional rail station
- Owner: Indian Railways
- Operator: Indian Railways
- Line: Guntur–Tenali section
- Distance: 10 km (6.2 mi) from Tenali; 24 km (15 mi) from Repalle
- Platforms: 1

Construction
- Structure type: Standard (on ground)

Other information
- Status: Active
- Station code: ZPI
- Zone(s): SCoR
- Division(s): Guntur
- Classification: F

Services
Preceding station	Indian Railways	Following station
Chinaravuru towards ?	Tenali–Repalle branch line	Vemuru towards ?
Route map
Location
- Location within India Location within Andhra Pradesh

Zampani railway station (station code:ZPI) is an Indian Railway station, located in Zampani of Bapatla district in Andhra Pradesh. It is situated on the Tenali–Repalle branch line and is administered by Guntur railway division of South Coast Railway zone. It is classified as an F-category station in terms of revenue and passenger footfalls.

== History ==
The Tenali–Repalle branch line, constructed by Madras and Southern Mahratta Railway, was opened in 1916.

== Structure and amenities ==
The station has roof top solar panels installed by the Indian railways, along with various railway stations and service buildings in the country, as a part of sourcing 500 MW solar energy.

== See also ==
- List of railway stations in India
