= Vejendla railway station =

Railway station in Andhra Pradesh, India

Vejendla
- Vejendla railway station signboard

General information
- Location: Vejendla, Guntur district, Andhra Pradesh; India
- Coordinates: 16°14′47″N 80°34′13″E
- System: Commuter and Regional rail station
- Owner: Indian Railways
- Operator: Indian Railways
- Line: Guntur–Tenali section
- Distance: 12 km (7.5 mi) from Guntur; 14 km (8.7 mi) from Tenali
- Platforms: 2

Construction
- Structure type: Standard (on ground)
- Parking: Available
- Accessible: Disabled access

Other information
- Station code: VJA
- Zone(s): SCR
- Division(s): Guntur
- Classification: NSG6

History
- Opened: 1916
- Rebuilt: 2019
- Electrified: 26 April 2019

Key dates
- 2019: Double line commissioned along with new platforms and new station building

Passengers
- 2017–18: 895

Services
| Preceding station | Indian Railways | Following station |
|---|---|---|
| Guntur towards ? | Tenali–Repalle branch line | Sangam Jagarlamudi towards ? |
Route map
Location
- Location within Andhra Pradesh Location within India

Vejendla railway station (station code:VJA) is an Indian Railway station, located in Vejendla of Guntur district in Andhra Pradesh. It is situated on Guntur–Tenali section and is administered by Guntur railway division of South Central Railway zone. It is classified as NSG6-category station in the division. The station is equipped with a rail yard for handling departmental Trains and track machines.

== History ==
The station was once a junction with Vejendla–Tsundur section, which is now a defunct section of the division. As a part of doubling and electrification works on the Tenali–Guntur section, commissioned on 26 April 2019, the station was also re-constructed with two new platforms.

== See also ==
- List of railway stations in India
