= Angalakuduru railway station =

Railway station in Andhra Pradesh, India

Angalakuduru
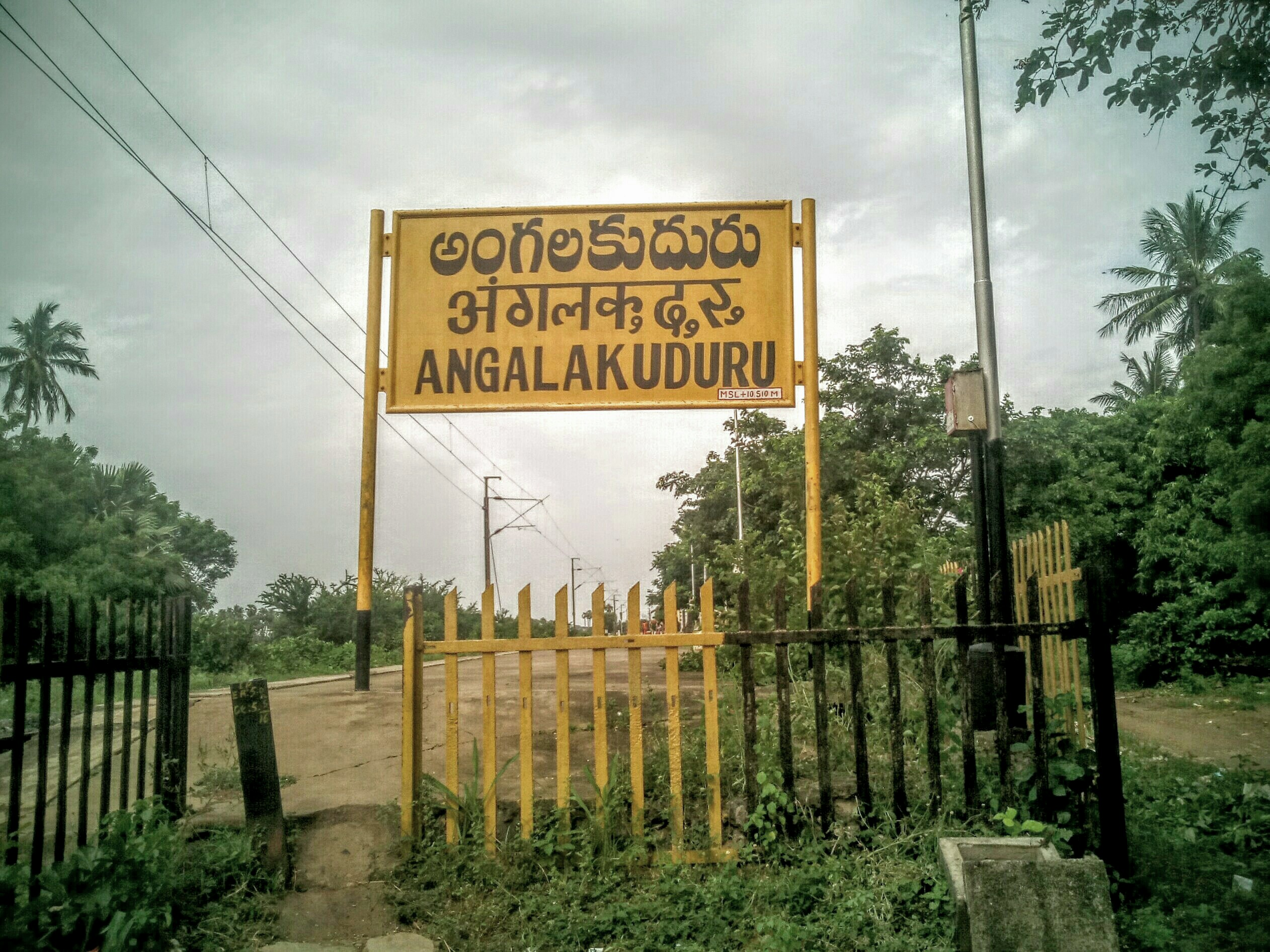
- A Train Station/Halt station in Tenali

General information
- Location: Yedlapalli Road, Angalakuduru, Tenali, Guntur district, Andhra Pradesh; India
- Coordinates: 16°14′33″N 80°36′31″E
- System: Commuter and Regional rail station
- Owner: Indian Railways
- Operator: Indian Railways
- Line: Guntur–Tenali section
- Distance: 22 km (14 mi) from Guntur; 5 km (3.1 mi) from Tenali
- Platforms: 2

Construction
- Structure type: Standard (on ground)

Other information
- Station code: AKU
- Zone(s): SCoR
- Division(s): Guntur
- Classification: F

History
- Electrified: 26 April 2019

Key dates
- 2019: Second rail track commissioned

Services
Preceding station	Indian Railways	Following station
Sangam Jagarlamudi towards ?	Tenali–Repalle branch line	Tenali Junction towards ?
Route map
Location
- Location within Andhra Pradesh Location within India

Angalakuduru railway station (station code:AKU) is an Indian Railway station, located in Tenali of Guntur district in Andhra Pradesh. It is situated on Guntur–Tenali section and is administered by Guntur railway division of South Central Railway zone. It is classified as an F-category station in the division. The station was electrified and a second track was laid, as a part of doubling and electrification works on the Tenali–Guntur section, which was commissioned on 26 April 2019.
