= Vemuru =

- Village
- Interactive map of Vemuru
- Location in Andhra Pradesh, India Vemuru (India)
- Coordinates: 16.1775°N 80.7425°E
- Country: India
- State: Andhra Pradesh
- Region: Bapatla
- District: Bapatla
- Mandal: Vemuru

Government
  - Type: Panchayati raj
  - Body: Vemuru gram panchayat
  - MLA: Nakka Ananda Babu 2009-2019, 2024-present (TDP)
- Elevation: 10 m (33 ft)

Population (2011)
  - Total: 9,796

Languages
  - Official: Telugu
- Time zone: UTC+5:30 (IST)
- Postal code: 522261
- Telephone code: +91, 08644
- Vehicle registration: AP-39
- Lok Sabha constituency: Bapatla (SC)
- Assembly constituency: Vemur (SC)

Vemuru is a village in Bapatla district of the India state of Andhra Pradesh. It is the headquarters of Vemuru mandal of Bapatla revenue division.

== Geography ==
Vemuru is situated at 16.1775°N 80.7425°E. The Village is spread over an area of 2284 hectares. It lies at an average altitude of 10 metres (33 ft) above mean sea level.

== Demographics ==
As of 2011 census, the village had a population of 9,796. The total population constitute, 4,850 males and 4,946 females –a sex ratio of 1020 females per 1000 males. 876 children are in the age group of 0–6 years, of which 457 are boys and 419 are girls. The average literacy rate stands at 81.32% with 6,457 literates, significantly higher than the state average of 72.39%.

A significant portion of the village's youth has migrated abroad to countries such as the United States, the United Kingdom, and Australia to pursue higher education and professional careers. This global diaspora maintains a strong connection with the village, often contributing to its local development and cultural events.

== Government and politics ==
Vemuru gram panchayat is the local self-government of the village. It is divided into wards, and each ward is represented by a ward member. The village forms a part of Andhra Pradesh Capital Region and is under the jurisdiction of APCRDA.

The Village is represented by Vemuru Assembly constituency in the state legislative assembly. The assembly segment forms a part of Bapatla Lok Sabha constituencywhich represents the lower house of Indian Parliament. The present MLA from Vemuru is Mr. Nakka Ananda Babu

== Economy ==
Vemuru's economy is primarily agro-based, with a significant portion of the population engaged in farming. Paddy is the major crop cultivated in the surrounding fertile lands. The village serves as a vital commercial center for the region's farmers through the Vemuru Agriculture Market Yard, which facilitates the trading and exporting of agricultural products. Furthermore, several Rice Mills operate within the village, processing the local produce and contributing to the regional paddy trade.

== Public Infrastructure and Amenities ==
The village is equipped with several essential public services and utilities. Healthcare is provided by a Government Hospital, which serves the local population and surrounding areas. The village maintains a dedicated safe drinking water facility providing potable water. Law and order are overseen by a local police station, while the Gram Panchayat office manages local administration.

Financial services in the village include a branch of the Central Bank of India, a 24-hour ATM, and a post office. Communication and digital infrastructure consist of a telephone exchange, an internet cafe, and widespread internet connectivity. A petrol bunk provides fuel for local transport and agricultural machinery.

Educational and intellectual resources are available at the local library, while vocational training is offered at a type institute. For entertainment, the village houses Satyanarayana Talkies, a cinema hall that serves as a primary center for recreation. There are three function halls (Kalyana Mandapams) available for weddings and private ceremonies.

A central landmark for community life is the NTR Pura Vedhika, a public stage used for meetings and cultural performances. This venue is the focal point for traditional festivities during major festivals, including Sankranti Sambaralu and Vinayaka Chavithi.

== Cuisine ==
Vemuru is known for its traditional Andhra culinary landscape and street food culture. The village has a distinct breakfast culture centered around hotels near the Sri Vigneswara Swamy Temple, which serve regional staples such as Puri, Idli, and Dosa.

The village serves as a hub for Pindi Vantalu (traditional Andhra snacks). Local Self-Help Groups (SHGs) contribute to the preservation of this culinary heritage by producing and selling items such as Ariselu, Boorelu, Gavvalu, Laddu, Chekkalu, Chakralu, and Boondi. Satyam Mithai Shop, located near the local High School, which is noted for its variety of traditional Indian sweets (Mithai).

In the evenings, the area surrounding the Sri Vigneswara Swamy Temple becomes a social center featuring numerous street food stalls. These stalls specialize in local favorites like Punugulu, Mirchi Bajji, and fresh Jalebi. Traditional soda shops also remain a staple of the evening street food scene, catering to both residents and travelers passing through the village.

== Religious landmarks ==
The village contains a significant number of religious sites, ranging from ancient historical temples to modern shrines and lineage-specific family temples.

=== Ancient and Historical Temples ===
- Sivalayam (Sri Ganga Parvathi Sametha Sri Rameswara and Ramalingeswara Temple): A historical temple dedicated to Lord Shiva. According to local sthalapuranam (temple legend), the temple was originally constructed by King Parikshit, the grandson of Arjuna from the Mahabharata, as an act of penance.
- Sri Venugopala Swamy Temple (Dibba Gudi) (formerly referred to as Sri Rajagopala Swamy): An ancient Vaishnavite shrine dedicated to Lord Krishna, constructed in the 10th Century by the Chola Kings (Cholaraju), reflecting the long-standing cultural heritage of the village.
- Sri Venu-Kesava Swamy Temple: A prominent temple dedicated to Lord Vishnu, serving as a center for Vaishnavite traditions in the community.
- Sri Vigneswara Swamy Temple: A temple dedicated to Lord Ganesha, Siddhi and Buddhi, located prominently near the village bus stand, serves as one of the most famous and central places of worship for daily prayers and major festivals.

=== Other Major Shrines ===
- Anjaneya Swamy Temple: A temple dedicated to Lord Hanuman, common in the region for protection and strength.
- Gita Mandiram: A spiritual center focused on the teachings and recitation of the Bhagavad Gita.
- Sai Baba Temple: A serene shrine dedicated to Shirdi Sai Baba, serving as a spiritual hub for the local devotee community. The temple features a Annadhana Hall, where sanctified meals (Prasadam) are served to devotees and those in need. While daily offerings are made, the temple hosts large-scale community feasts on special occasions and festivals to honor Baba's teachings of selfless service.
- Sri Potuluri Veerabrahmam Gari Gudi: A temple honoring the 17th-century Telugu saint and social reformer, Sri Potuluri Veerabrahmam.
- Maalakshmi Chettu: A sacred neem tree serves as a place of worship. Devotees regularly offer prayers and perform rituals at the site, which holds local religious significance.
- Ramalayam: A temple dedicated to Lord Rama, which serves as a central hub for community festivals like Sri Rama Navami.
- Abhaya Anjaneya Swamy Temple: A temple featuring a prominent statue of Lord Hanuman.
- Bhuvaneswari Ammavari Temple: A sacred shrine dedicated to Goddess Bhuvaneswari.
- Sri Varasiddhi Vinayaka Temple: This Shrine dedicated to Lord Ganesha, typically used for primary prayers and festival celebrations.
- Ayyappa Swamy Temple: A dedicated site for devotees of Lord Ayyappa, particularly active during the annual Mandalam season.

=== Village Deities and Family Shrines (Grama Devatalu) ===
The village is unique for its numerous shrines dedicated to local protector deities, many of which are historically associated with and maintained by specific family lineages (Vamsasthulu):

- Grama Devatha Katllamma Gudi: The primary temple for the village's protective goddess.
- Vemuri vari Nagaramma Temple: A shrine dedicated to the goddess Nagaramma.
- Sri Amerneni vari Veerla Ankamma Devara Ellu: A temple dedicated to Goddess Veerla Ankamma, belonging to the Amerneni family.
- Sri Koganti vari Ankamma Gangamma Devara Ellu: A shrine dedicated to the deities Ankamma and Gangamma, maintained by the Koganti family.

Other Places of Worship:

LEF, AELC Church: The village has a local church serving the Christian community.

Jamia Masjid: A mosque is located within the village, serving as a place of worship for the Muslim community.

== Education ==
The village's educational facilities include institutions for primary, secondary, and higher secondary education. There are four Mandal Parishad Primary (MPP) schools and two private schools serving the elementary level. Secondary education is provided by a Government High School, and a Government junior college offers higher secondary education. Additionally, the village is served by Anganwadi, which provide early childhood care and pre-school education.

== Transport ==
Vemuru is well-connected by rail, road and air, making it easily accessible from major cities in Andhra Pradesh.

- Rail: The village has its own railway station, Vemuru Railway Station (VMU), is located on Tenali–Repalle branch line of Guntur-Repalle section. It is administered under Guntur railway division of South Central Railways.
- Road: Vemuru is connected by well-maintained roads to nearby towns. APSRTC operates busses from Tenali on Tenali – Kollur route.
- Air: The nearest airport is Vijayawada International Airport (Gannavaram), located approximately 70–75 km away. It connects the region to major domestic and international destinations.

== Eminent personalities ==
- Vemuri Gaggaiah (1895–1955), A legendary Telugu film and theatre actor, was born in this village famous for his powerful portrayals of mythological characters like Yama and Ravana in the early era of Telugu cinema.
- Konijeti Rosaiah(1933-2021), Former Chief Minister of Andhra Pradesh, Former Governor of Tamil Nadu. He was known for his long tenure as the Finance Minister of Andhra Pradesh.

== Notable people ==
- Nakka Ananda Babu Member of the Legislative Assembly of Vemuru.
- Mandava Sai Kumar is Enterpriser and Public Figure connection with Telugu cinema.

== See also ==
- Vemuru mandal
- Vemuru mandal villages
