= Pallekona =

- Village
- Interactive map of Pallekona
- Location in Andhra Pradesh, India
- Coordinates: 16°29′32″N 80°00′32″E
- Country: India
- State: Andhra Pradesh
- District: Bapatla
- Mandal: Bhattiprolu

Government
  - Type: Panchayati raj
  - Body: Pallekona Gram Panchayat

Area
  - Total: 856 ha (2,120 acres)

Population (2011)
  - Total: 4,047
  - Density: 473/km^{2} (1,220/sq mi)

Languages
  - Official: Telugu
- Time zone: UTC+5:30 (IST)
- PIN: 522xxx
- Area code: +91–
- Vehicle registration: AP

Pallekona is a village in Bapatla district of the Indian state of Andhra Pradesh. It is the located in Bhattiprolu mandal of Tenali revenue division. It forms a part of Andhra Pradesh Capital Region.

== Geography ==
Pallekona is situated to the south of the mandal headquarters, Bhattiprolu, at 16°29′32″N 80°00′32″E. It is spread over an area of 856 ha (2,120 acres).

== Demographics ==
As of 2011 census of India, the total number of households in the village were 1,134. It had a total population of 4,047, which includes 2,049 males, 1,998 females and 365 children in the age group of 0–6 years. The average literacy rate stands at 57.08% with 10,337 literates.

== Governance ==
Pallekona gram panchayat is the local self-government of the village. It is divided into wards and each ward is represented by a ward member.

== Education ==
As per the school information report for the academic year 2018–19, the village has a total of 8 schools. These schools include 2 private and 6 Zilla/Mandal Parishad.

== Transport ==
Pallikona railway station provides rail connectivity, which is located on the Tenali-Repalle branch line of Guntur railway division.
