= Penumarru =

- Village
- Interactive map of Penumarru
- Location in Andhra Pradesh, India
- Coordinates: 16.0937°N 80.8527°E
- Country: India
- State: Andhra Pradesh
- District: Bapatla
- Mandal: Bhattiprolu

Government
  - Type: Panchayati raj
  - Body: Penumarru gram panchayat

Area
  - Total: 744 ha (1,840 acres)

Population (2011)
  - Total: 1,579
  - Density: 212/km^{2} (550/sq mi)

Languages
  - Official: Telugu
- Time zone: UTC+5:30 (IST)
- PIN: 522xxx
- Area code: +91–
- Vehicle registration: AP

Penumarru is a village in Bapatla district of the Indian state of Andhra Pradesh. It is the located in Vemuru mandal of Tenali revenue division.

== Geography ==
Penumarru is located at 16.0937°N 80.8527°E. The village is spread over an area of 744 ha (1,840 acres).

== Government and politics ==
Penumarru gram panchayat is the local self-government of the village. It is divided into wards and each ward is represented by a ward member.

== Transport ==
Penumarru railway station provides the village with rail connectivity.

== Education ==
As per the school information report for the academic year 2018–19, the village has only two Mandal Parishad.
