= Yadlapati Venkata Rao =

Indian politician (1919–2022)

- Rao in an interview with ABN Andhra Jyothi in 2018

Member of Parliament, Rajya Sabha
- In office 22 June 1998 – 21 June 2004
- Preceded by: Renuka Chowdhury
- Succeeded by: Jairam Ramesh
- Constituency: Andhra Pradesh

Minister for Agriculture, Law and Planning Government of Andhra Pradesh
- In office 6 March 1978 – 11 October 1980
- Governor: Sharda Mukherjee; K. C. Abraham
- Chief Minister: Marri Chenna Reddy

Member of Legislative Assembly Andhra Pradesh
- In office 1967–1983
- Preceded by: Kalluri Chandramouli
- Succeeded by: N. Bhaskara Rao
- Constituency: Vemuru

Personal details
- Born: 16 December 1919 Bodapadu, Madras Presidency, British India
- Died: 28 February 2022 (aged 102) Hyderabad, Telangana, India
- Party: Telugu Desam Party (1988–2022)
- Other political affiliations: Krishikar Lok Party; Swatantra Party (1967-1978); Indian National Congress (1978–1988)
- Spouse: Alavelu Mangamma
- Children: 2
- Education: Andhra Christian College

Yadlapati Venkata Rao (16 December 1919 – 28 February 2022) was an Indian politician from the state of Andhra Pradesh. Rao served as the Minister for Agriculture, Law and Planning in the united Andhra Pradesh from 1978 to 1980. He was elected thrice to the Vemuru Assembly constituency of the Andhra Pradesh Legislative Assembly as the Member of the Legislative Assembly (MLA), and served as the Member of Parliament (MP) in Rajya Sabha representing Andhra Pradesh between 1998 and 2004.

A lawyer by profession, he entered active politics from the Krishikar Lok Party. He was first elected as an MLA from the Swatantra Party in 1967 and moved to the Indian National Congress in 1978. He founded Sangam Dairy, a farmers' cooperative, in 1977 and was crucial in establishing Jampani Sugar Factory. Rao joined the Telugu Desam Party in 1988, serving in its highest decision-making body and headed its farmers' division, Telugu Rythu. During his term as an MP, Rao was a member of the committee on Members of Parliament Local Area Development Scheme.

== Early life and education ==
Yadlapati Venkat Rao was born on 16 December 1919 in Bodapadu village of Amruthalur mandal near Tenali in modern-day Andhra Pradesh. He was schooled at Turumilla. He studied for his B.A. at Andhra Christian College in Guntur before graduating in law in Madras. During his law education, he worked as the president of Andhra Association. He began his career as a lawyer in Tenali in 1945 before moving into active politics in 1962. He participated in the Indian independence movement.

== Career ==
=== Early political career ===
Yadlapati Venkata Rao was a follower of N. G. Ranga. He played a crucial role and helped Ranga in establishing the Krishikar Lok Party. He later joined the Swatantra Party. He contested as a candidate from the Swatantra Party and lost as the MLA to the united Andhra Pradesh Legislative Assembly from the Vemuru constituency in Guntur district, Andhra Pradesh in 1962 elections and 1965 by-elections. He later won as the MLA in the 1967 and 1972 elections. In the 1972 elections, he became the sole winner from the Swatantra Party in Coastal Andhra.

In 1977, he founded Sangam Dairy in Guntur district, now developed into a farmers' cooperative. He was also the founding president of the organization. He also played a crucial role in establishing Jampani Sugar Factory.

=== Indian National Congress ===
In 1978, Rao joined the Indian National Congress and won as the MLA from Vemuru constituency in the 1978 elections. He was inducted into Marri Chenna Reddy's cabinet and was allotted the ministries of agriculture, law and planning (1978–1980) and headed Andhra Pradesh Industrial Development Corporation. He was also given an additional charge of Department of Civil Supplies for three months during his tenure.

=== Telugu Desam Party ===
The Telugu Desam Party (TDP) won the 1983 elections and formed the government, while Rao contested and lost as a Congress candidate against Nadendla Bhaskara Rao. Despite initially rejecting on moral grounds, Rao, upon a request from N. T. Rama Rao in 1983, joined as a member of TDP's Karshaka Parishat, the party's famers' unit, while he was still a member of Congress. This move did not fare well within the Congress party.

He later heeded a call by N. T. Rama Rao and joined TDP in 1988, resigning from Congress. He worked as a member of TDP's politburo, the highest decision-making body of the party, and as the chairman of Karshaka Parishat and as the president of Telugu Rythu, a frontal organization of the party. He contested the 1989 elections and lost as a TDP candidate.

He was elected Guntur Zilla Parishad Chairman (1995–1998) before he was elected to Rajya Sabha in 1998, in which position he continued until 2004. During his tenure, he was a member of the committee on Members of Parliament Local Area Development Scheme.

Rao retired from active politics in 2004; however, he continued to be a member of the Telugu Desam Party.

== Personal life and death ==
Rao married Alavelu Mangamma and had a son and a daughter. He wrote his autobiography titled Naa Jeevina Gamanam (transl. The Course of My Life) in 2011. He turned 100 in December 2019. He died at his daughter's home in Hyderabad, where he spent his later life post his wife's death in 2021, on 28 February 2022, at the age of 102. His last rites were performed at Tenali on 2 March with State honours. Former chief minister of Andhra Pradesh and TDP's president, N. Chandrababu Naidu, paid tributes to Rao by recalling his services as a farmer leader.
