= Jagarlamudi =

Jagarlamudi may refer to:

- Jagarlamudi Kuppuswamy Chowdary College, an educational institution in Guntur of the Indian state of Andhra Pradesh.
- Sangam Jagarlamudi, a village in Guntur district of the Indian state of Andhra Pradesh.
- Sangam Jagarlamudi railway station, an Indian railway station in Sangam Jagarlamudi of Andhra Pradesh.
- Radhakrishna Jagarlamudi, also known as Krish (director), an Indian film director.
