= Jampani =

- Village
- Interactive map of Jampani
- Location in Andhra Pradesh, India Jampani (India)
- Coordinates: 16.194114°N 80.708967°E
- Country: India
- State: Andhra Pradesh
- Region: Bapatla
- District: Guntur

Population (2011)
  - Total: 7,863

Languages
  - Official: Telugu
- Time zone: UTC+5:30 (IST)
- Vehicle registration: AP

Jampani is a village in Vemuru mandal, located in Bapatla district of the Indian state of Andhra Pradesh.

== Transport ==
APSRTC operates busses from Tenali on Tenali – Kollur route. Zampani railway station is located on Tenali–Repalle branch line of Guntur-Repalle section. It is administered under Guntur railway division of South Central Railways.

== See also ==
- Vemuru mandal
