= Kakarla =

Kakarla may refer to:

== People ==
- Kakarla Subba Rao, bone radiologist and former director of Nizam's Institute of Medical Sciences, Hyderabad
- Kakarla Tyaga Brahmam or Tyagaraja (1767–1847), composer of Carnatic music

== Geography ==
- Kakarla, a village in Ardhaveedu mandal, in the Markapuram district of Andhra Pradesh, India
- Kakarlamudi, a village in Vemuru mandal, in the Guntur district of Andhra Pradesh, India
- Kakarlapalli, a village in Khammam district, Andhra Pradesh, India
