= Merugu Nagarjuna =

Indian politician

Dr. Merugu Nagarjuna

Minister of Social Welfare Government of Andhra Pradesh
- In office 11 April 2022 – 4 June 2024
- Governor: S. Abdul Nazeer; Biswabhusan Harichandan
- Chief Minister: Y. S. Jagan Mohan Reddy

Member of the Legislative Assembly Andhra Pradesh
- In office 2019-2024
- Preceded by: Nakka Ananda Babu
- Succeeded by: Nakka Ananda Babu
- Constituency: Vemuru

Personal details
- Born: 15 June 1966 (age 60) Vellaturu village, Bhattiprolu mandal, Guntur district
- Party: YSR Congress Party
- Spouse: Kambham Nagamani
- Children: Sree Ram Kiran Nag, Sree Ram Chandan Nag, Sree Ramya Monica Nag
- Parent: Sri Koteswara Rao (father)

Merugu Nagarjuna is an Indian politician, Minister for Social Welfare of Andhra Pradesh and Member of Legislative Assembly belonging to Yuvajana Sramika Raitu Congress Party. He represents Vemuru assembly constituency.

== Early life ==
Merugu Nagarjuna is a native of Vellaturu village, Bhattiprolu mandal, Guntur district. He was born on June 15, 1966, to Koteswara Rao in Vellaturu village, Bhattiprolu mandal, Guntur district.

== Education ==
In 1994, Merugu Nagarjuna completed his Master of Commerce, Master of Philosophy, Doctor of Philosophy in Andhra University. He worked as a Professor of Andhra University in Visakhapatnam.

== Political career ==
Merugu Nagarjuna started his political journey with the Congress Party and Nagarjuna is very active in student politics from his childhood. He became an activist of Indian National Congress party by Y. S. Rajasekhara Reddy and later on he served as Chairman of SC, ST Commission Andhra Pradesh. He then gradually rose in Yuvajana Sramika Raitu Congress Party (YSRCP).

Merugu Nagarjuna joined the YSRCP and early he served as President of SC CELL Andhra Pradesh state of the YSR Congress Party. He has served as a Convenor of YSRCP. He served as an Official Spokesperson. In 2019, Nagarjuna is the current MLA (Member of the Legislative Assembly) of YSRCP in Vemuru constituency, Guntur district.
