= Angalakuduru =

- Suburb, Area of Tenali
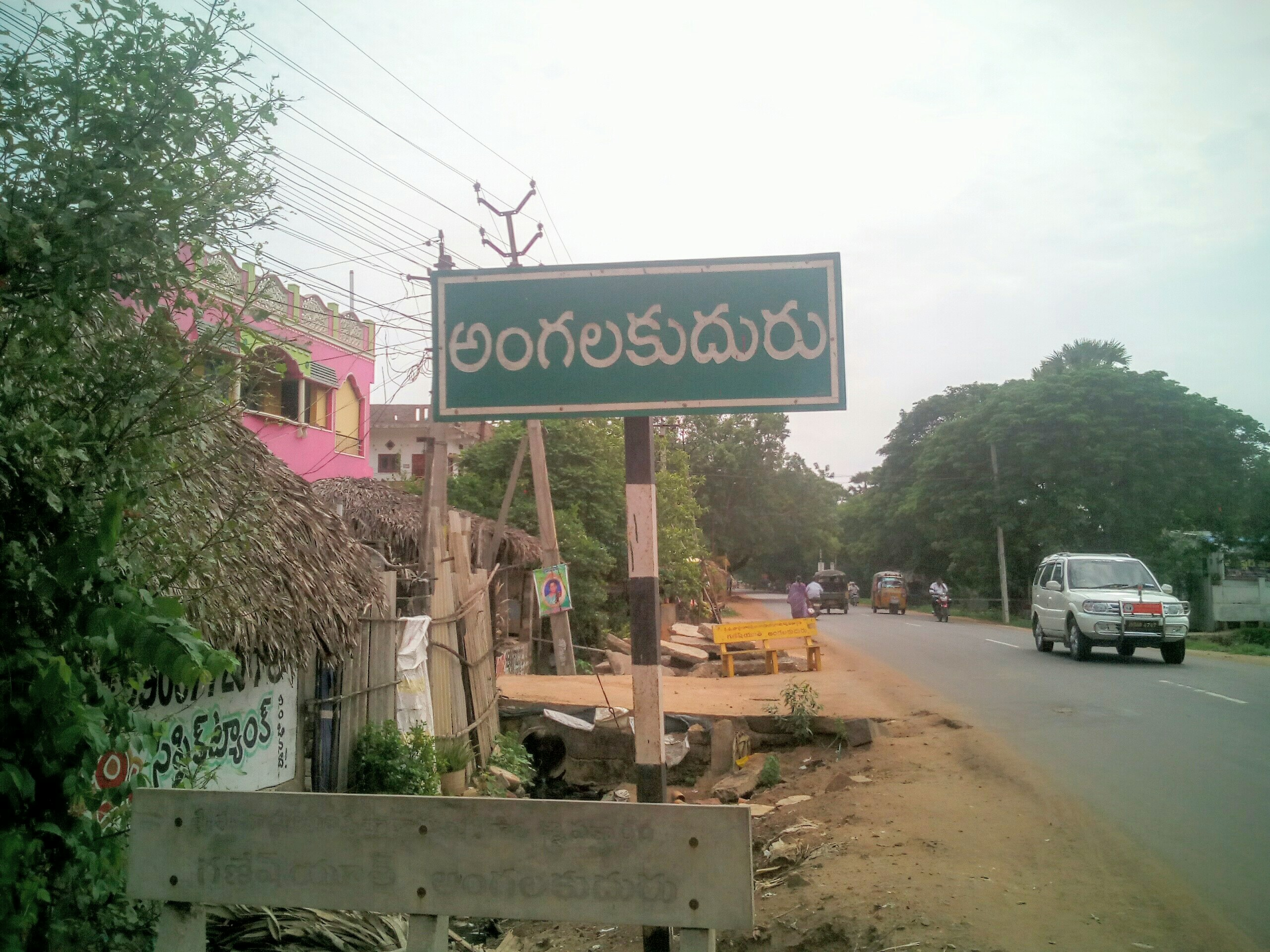
- Signboard of Angalakuduru village
- Interactive map of Angalakuduru
- Location in Andhra Pradesh, India
- Coordinates: 16°14′21″N 80°36′42″E
- Country: India
- State: Andhra Pradesh
- District: Guntur
- Mandal: Tenali
- Seat: Angalakuduru Gram Panchayat
- Wards: 14

Government
  - Type: Panchayati raj
  - Body: Angalakuduru Gram Sabha
  - Sarpanch: Vacant

Area
  - Total: 911 ha (2,250 acres)

Population (2011)
  - Total: 9,920
  - Density: 1,090/km^{2} (2,820/sq mi)

Languages
  - Official: Telugu
- Time zone: UTC+5:30 (IST)
- PIN: 522211
- Area code: +918644
- Vehicle registration: AP

Angalakuduru is an area of Tenali in Guntur district of the Indian state of Andhra Pradesh. It is located in Tenali mandal of Tenali revenue division. It is a residential area that forms part of Andhra Pradesh Capital Region.

== Geography ==
Angalakuduru is situated to the west of Tenali, at 16°14′21″N 80°36′42″E.

== Demographics ==
As of 2011 Census of India, Angalakuduru had a population of 9920. A sex ratio of 1059 females per 1000 males. The average literacy rate stands at 77.75% with 7,088 literates, significantly higher than the state average of 67.41%.

== Government and politics ==
Angalakuduru gram panchayat is the local self-government of the village. There are 20 wards, each represented by an elected ward member. The present sarpanch is vacant, elected indirectly by the ward members. The village is administered by the Tenali Mandal Parishad at the intermediate level of panchayat raj institutions.

== Economy ==
Agriculture is the main occupation of the village and the main crops are paddy, maize, black gram etc. Apart from it, small scale occupations produce weaved baskets, bags, mats etc., from water hyacinth.

== Transport ==
Angalakuduru has road and rail connectivity. It lies on the Guntur–Tenali road passing through the village. Angalakuduru railway station is an F–category station on Guntur–Tenali section and is administered under Guntur railway division of South Central Railway zone.

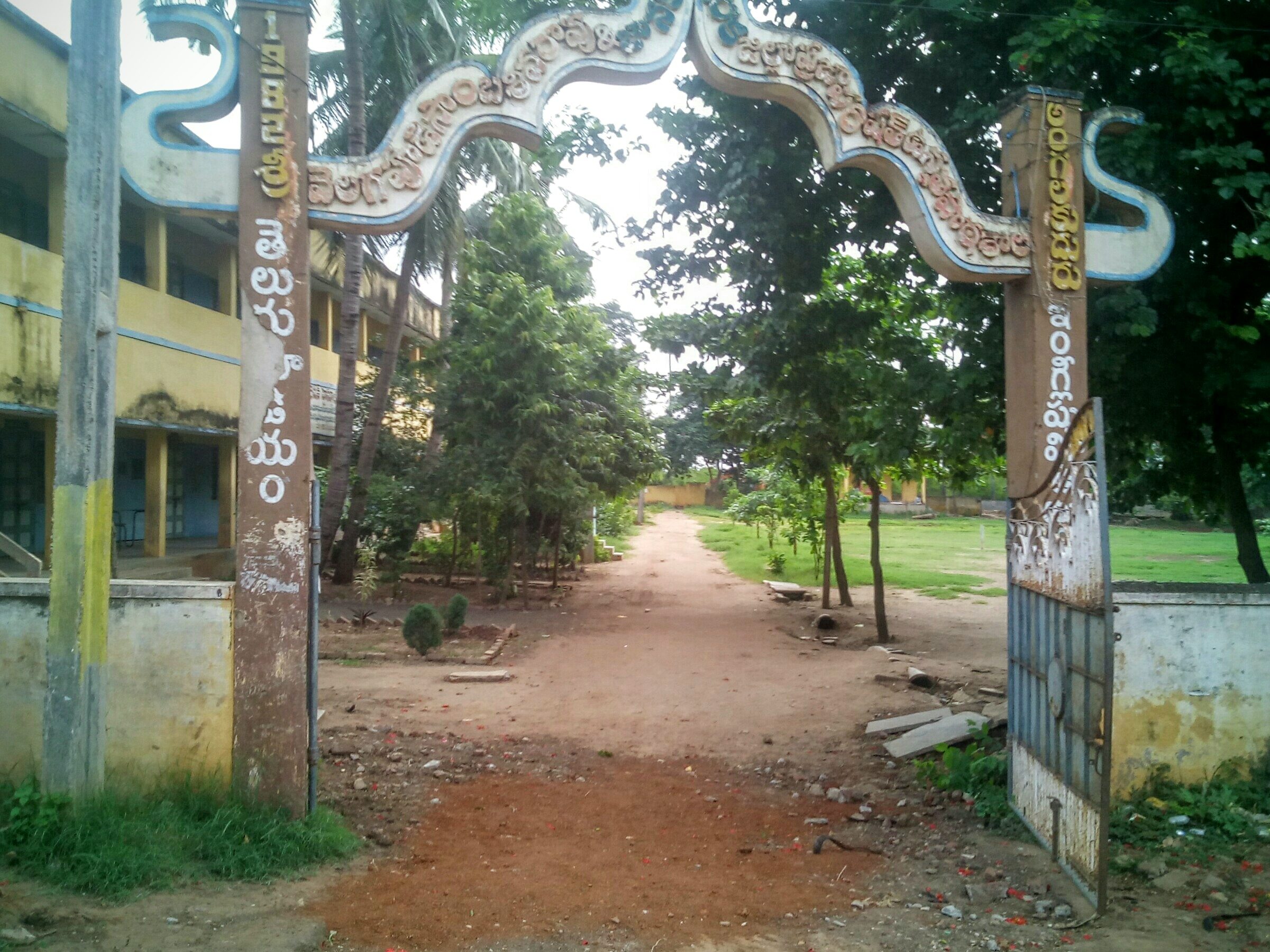
VSR and JDM Zilla Parishad High School

The nearest railway station to Angalakuduru village are Angalakuduru Railway station and Tenali junction railway station. The village is well connected to Tenali city . Angalakuduru is at a distance of 3 km from Tenali. According to 2011 In the Tenali City expansion the Angalakuduru village was present.

== Education ==
The primary and secondary school education is imparted by government, aided and private schools, under the School Education Department of the state. The total number of students enrolled in primary, upper primary and high schools in the village are 1,471. VSR and JDM Zilla Parishad High School is a Zilla Parishad funded school, which provides secondary education in the village.

== See also ==
- List of villages in Guntur district
