= Delta Express (India) =

Train in India

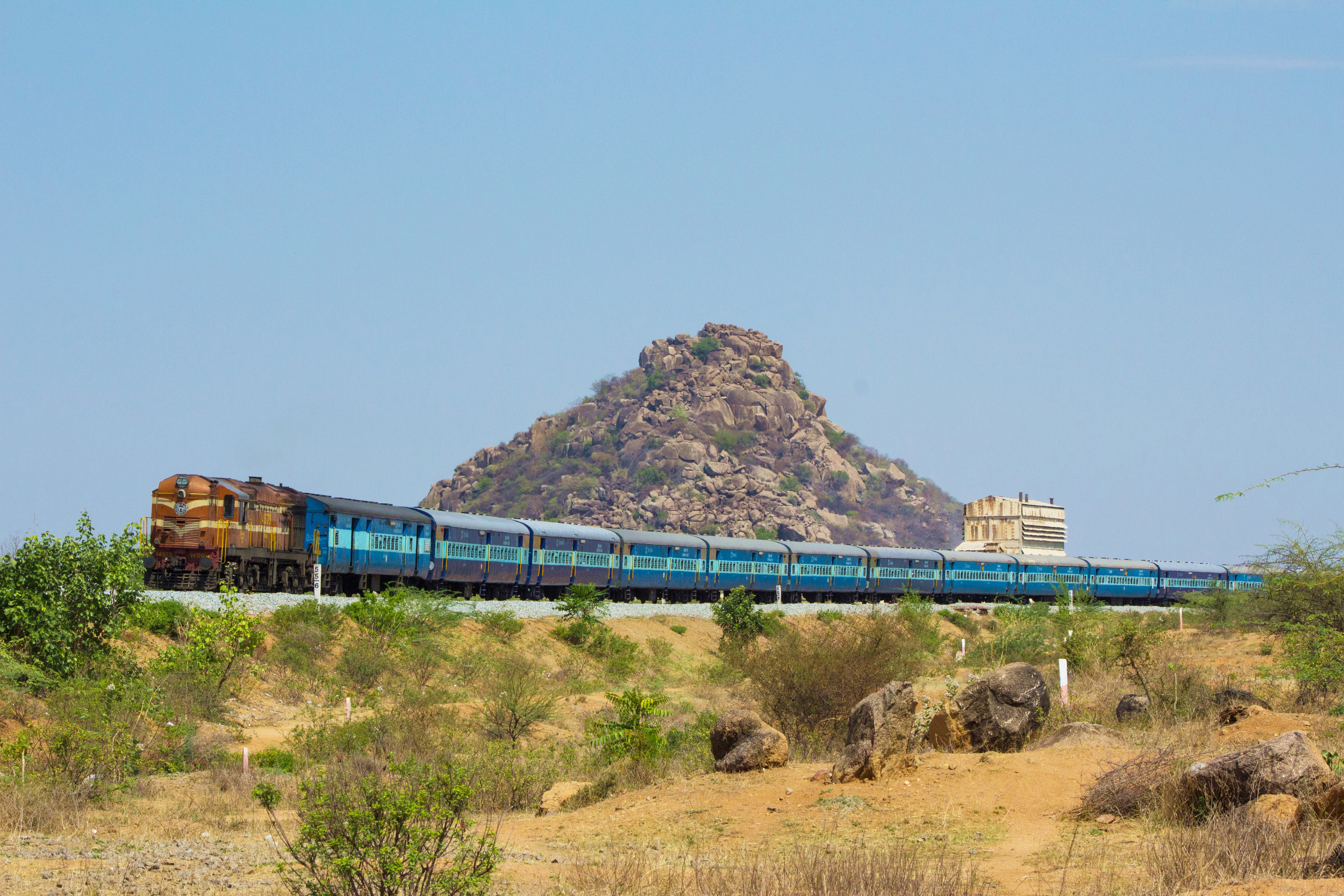
- Delta Express

Overview
- Service type: Express
- Locale: Andhra Pradesh
- Current operator: South Central Railway

Route
- Termini: Vikarabad/Repalle; Repalle/Vikarabad Junction
- Stops: 19/17
- Distance travelled: 347 km (216 mi) (approx.)
- Average journey time: 8 hours (approx.)
- Service frequency: Daily
- Train number: 17625 / 17626

On-board services
- Classes: 2-Tier AC,3-Tier AC, Sleeper Class, General
- Seating arrangements: Yes
- Sleeping arrangements: Yes
- Catering facilities: On boarding

Technical
- Track gauge: 1,676 mm (5 ft 6 in)
- Electrification: WAP-7/WAP-4
- Operating speed: 40 km/h (25 mph) average with halts
Route map
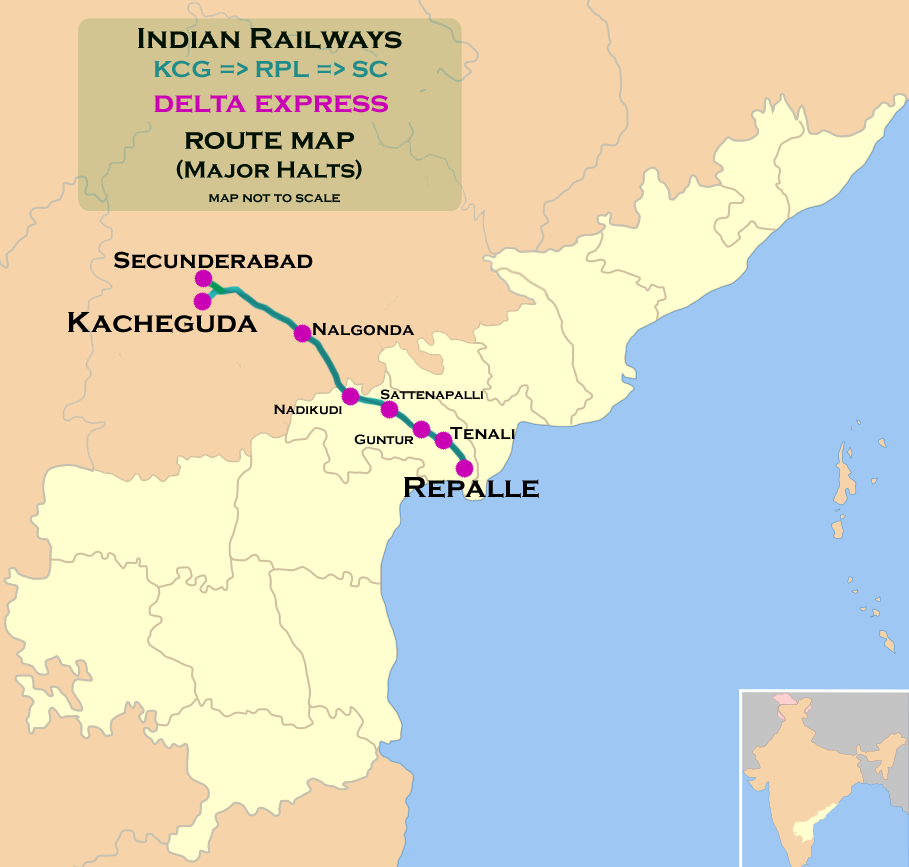

Delta Express is an Express Train in India which runs between Vikarabad of Telangana and Repalle of Andhra Pradesh. The South Central Railway zone of the Indian Railways administers this train. Train number 17625 runs from Vikarabad to Repalle while 17626 runs from Repalle to Vikarabad Junction.

The train was one of the oldest passenger trains of SCR and the most popular service in the route which used to cater many middle class people reaching the Hyderabad with a very less price, Initially this used to run as a fast passenger service and used to always run highly occupancy throughout the year, from 19 October 2017 the train was upgraded to an express service.

== Features ==
The Kacheguda–Repalle Express is usually hauled by a WDM-2/WDM-3A.

== RSA ==
This Train shares its rake with Secunderabad–Manuguru Express and Repalle Secunderabad exp with PM at KCG RSA Pattern 17625->17646->12745->12746->17645->17626->07592

== Coach composition ==
The train usually consists of 20 standard LHB Coaches:

- 1 AC Two Tier
- 3 AC Three Tier
- 9 Sleeper classes
- 5 General (unreserved)
- 1 SLR
- 1 Generator Car

As is customary with most other train services in India, coach composition may be amended at the discretion of Indian Railways, depending on demand.

Loco	1	2	3	4	5	6	7	8	9	10	11	12	13	14	15	16	17	18	19	20	21	22
	SLR	GEN	GEN	GEN	S1	S2	S3	S4	S5	S6	S7	S8	S9	S10	S11	B1	A1	GEN	GEN	GEN	GEN	SLR

== See also ==
- Indian Railways
- South Central Railways
- Valigonda train wreck
