= Pedalanka, Bhattiprolu mandal =

Pedalanka
- Village
- Interactive map of Pedalanka
- Location in Andhra Pradesh, India
- Coordinates: 16.0984°N 80.8526°E
- Country: India
- State: Andhra Pradesh
- District: Bapatla
- Mandal: Bhattiprolu

Government
  - Type: Panchayati raj
  - Body: Pedalanka Gram Panchayat

Area
  - Total: 405 ha (1,000 acres)

Population (2011)
  - Total: 1,385
  - Density: 342/km^{2} (886/sq mi)

Languages
  - Official: Telugu
- Time zone: UTC+5:30 (IST)
- PIN: 522257
- Area code: +91–
- Vehicle registration: AP

Pedalanka is a village in Bapatla district of the Indian state of Andhra Pradesh. It is the located in Bhattiprolu mandal of Tenali revenue division. It forms a part of Andhra Pradesh Capital Region.

== Geography ==
Pedalanka is situated to the southeast of the mandal headquarters, Bhattiprolu, at 16.0984°N 80.8526°E. It is spread over an area of 405 ha (1,000 acres).

== Government and politics ==
Pesarlanka gram panchayat is the local self-government of the village. It is divided into wards and each ward is represented by a ward member.

== Education ==
As per the school information report for the academic year 2018–19, the village has a total of 3 schools. These schools include one MPP and 2 private schools.
