= ZPI =

ZPI may refer to:

- Protein Z-related protease inhibitor, a protein circulating in the blood
- Zero Point Interchange, a cloverleaf interchange in Islamabad, Pakistan
- Pinner tube station, a London Underground station in London, England (National Rail station code ZPI)
- Zampini railway station, India (Indian Railways station code ZPI)
