= BQU =

BQU may refer to:

- Bhattiprolu railway station (by station code)
- Blue Quills University, the short name of University nuhelot’įne thaiyots’į nistameyimâkanak Blue Quills
- Guru language (by ISO 639-3 language code)
- J. F. Mitchell Airport (by IATA airport code)
