= Bhattiprolu railway station =

Railway station in Bhattiprolu, India

Bhattiprolu

General information
- Location: Bhattiprolu, Bapatla district, Andhra Pradesh; India
- Coordinates: 16.1059°N 80.7880°E
- Owner: Indian Railways
- Operator: Indian Railways
- Line: Tenali–Repalle branch line
- Platforms: 1 side platform
- Tracks: 1
- Train operators: Indian Railways

Construction
- Structure type: Standard (on ground)

Other information
- Station code: BQU
- Zone(s): South Central Railway
- Division(s): Guntur
- Classification: E

Services
Preceding station	Indian Railways	Following station
Penumarru towards ?	Tenali–Repalle branch line	Pallikona towards ?
Location
- Location within Andhra Pradesh Location within India

Bhattiprolu railway station (station code:BQU), is a D-category Indian Railways station in Guntur railway division of South Central Railway zone. It is situated on the Tenali–Repalle branch line and provides rail connectivity to Bhattiprolu.

== History ==
The Tenali–Repalle branch line, constructed by Madras and Southern Mahratta Railway, was opened in 1916.

== Structure and amenities ==
The station has roof top solar panels installed by the Indian railways, along with various railway stations and service buildings in the country, as a part of sourcing 500 MW solar energy.

== See also ==
- List of railway stations in India
