= Dharma Rao =

Dharma Rao or Dharmarao may refer to:

- Alapati Dharma Rao, former Home Minister of Andhra Pradesh, India.
- Tapi Dharma Rao, Indian writer and Sahitya Akademi Award winner.
