= Vemuru Assembly constituency =

Constituency of the Andhra Pradesh Legislative Assembly, India

Coordinates: 16.18°N 80.74°E

Vemuru
- Constituency No. 89 for the Andhra Pradesh Legislative Assembly
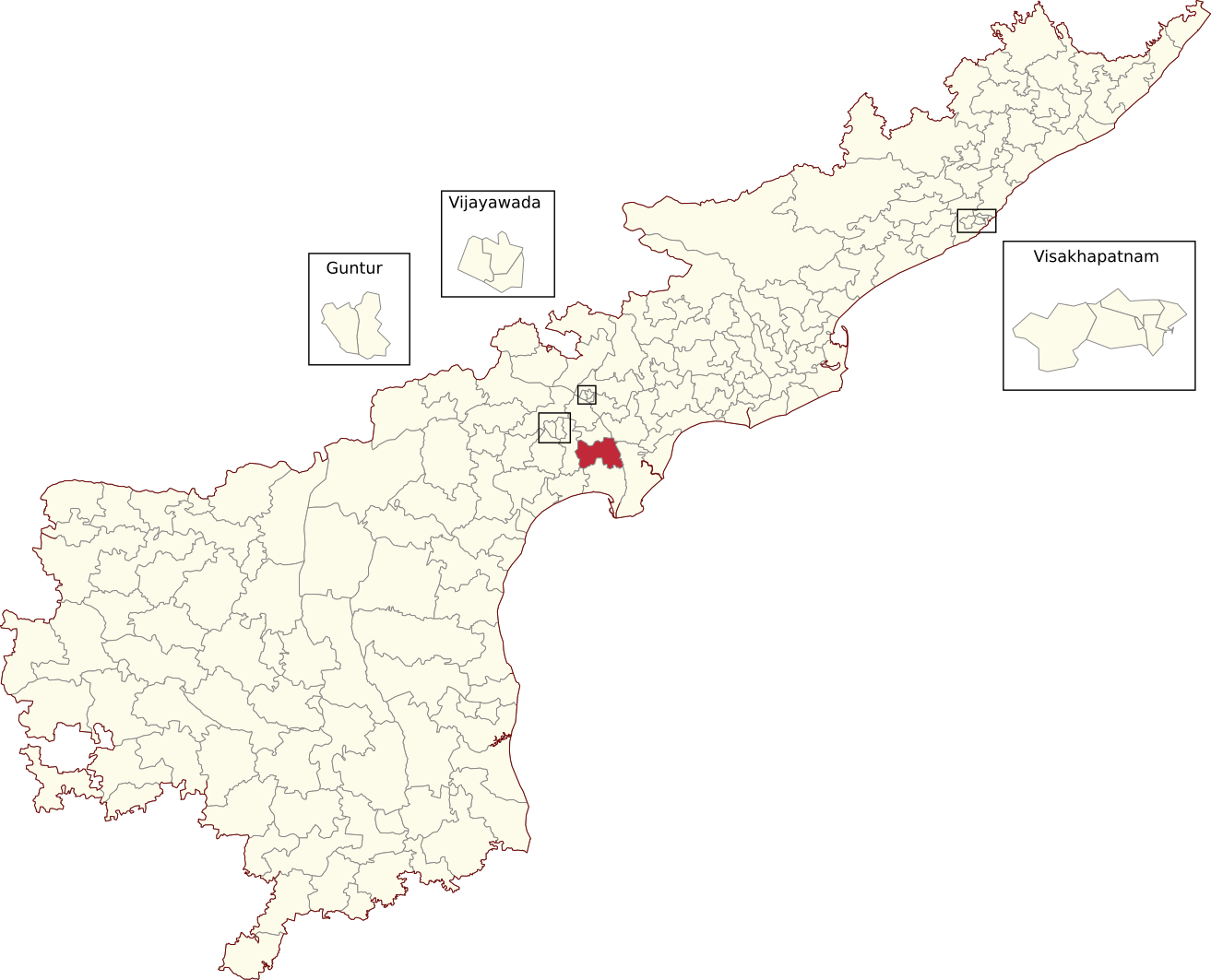
- Location of Vemuru Assembly constituency within Andhra Pradesh

Constituency details
- Country: India
- Region: South India
- State: Andhra Pradesh
- District: Guntur district
- Lok Sabha constituency: Bapatla
- Established: 1955
- Total electors: 194,748
- Reservation: SC

Member of Legislative Assembly
- 16th Andhra Pradesh Legislative Assembly
- Incumbent Nakka Ananda Babu
- Party: TDP
- Alliance: NDA
- Elected year: 2024

Vemuru Assembly constituency is a Scheduled Caste reserved constituency in Bapatla district of Andhra Pradesh that elects representatives to the Andhra Pradesh Legislative Assembly in India. It is one of the seven assembly segments of Bapatla Lok Sabha constituency.

Nakka Ananda Babu is the current MLA of the constituency, having won the 2024 Andhra Pradesh Legislative Assembly election from Telugu Desam Party. As of 25 March 2019, there are a total of 194,748 electors in the constituency. The constituency was established in 1955, as per the Delimitation Orders (1955).

== Mandals ==
Vemuru
Kollur
Tsundur
Bhattiprolu
Amruthalur

== Members of the Legislative Assembly ==
Year	Member	Political party
1955	Kalluri Chandramouli	Indian National Congress
1962	Kalluri Chandramouli	Indian National Congress
1967	Yadlapati Venkata Rao	Swatantra Party
1972	Yadlapati Venkata Rao	Swatantra Party
1978	Yadlapati Venkata Rao	Indian National Congress (I)
1983	N. Bhaskara Rao	Telugu Desam Party
1985	Kodali Veeraiah	Telugu Desam Party
1989	Alapati Dharma Rao	Indian National Congress
1994	Alapati Rajendra Prasad	Telugu Desam Party
1999	Alapati Rajendra Prasad	Telugu Desam Party
2004	Satishpaul Raj	Indian National Congress
2009	Nakka Ananda Babu	Telugu Desam Party
2014	Nakka Ananda Babu	Telugu Desam Party
2019	Merugu Nagarjuna	YSR Congress Party
2024	Nakka Ananda Babu	Telugu Desam Party

== Election results ==
=== 2024 ===
2024 Andhra Pradesh Legislative Assembly election: Vemuru
Party	Candidate	Votes	%	±%
TDP	Nakka Ananda Babu	94,922	54.92	
YSRCP	Varikuti Ashok Babu	72,901	42.18	
NOTA	None Of The Above	1,763	1.02	
Majority		22,021	12.73	
Turnout		1,72,851		
TDP gain from YSRCP		Swing		

=== 2019 ===
2019 Andhra Pradesh Legislative Assembly election: Vemuru
Party	Candidate	Votes	%	±%
YSRCP	Merugu Nagarjuna	81,671	47.59	
TDP	Nakka Ananda Babu	71,672	41.76	
JSP	Appikatla Bharat Bhushan	13,038	7.60	
Majority		9,999	5.83	
Turnout		171,618	87.52	+1.95
Registered electors		195,274		
YSRCP gain from TDP		Swing		

=== 2014 ===
2014 Andhra Pradesh Legislative Assembly election: Vemuru
Party	Candidate	Votes	%	±%
TDP	Nakka Ananda Babu	77,222	48.89	
YSRCP	Merugu Nagarjuna	75,095	47.54	
Majority		2,127	1.35	
Turnout		158,723	85.57	+3.87
Registered electors		185,485		
TDP hold		Swing		

=== 2009 ===
2009 Andhra Pradesh Legislative Assembly election: Vemuru
Party	Candidate	Votes	%	±%
TDP	Nakka Ananda Babu	55,168	37.86	−6.90
INC	Merugu Nagarjuna	52,938	36.33	−17.07
PRP	Kathi Padma Rao	23,356	16.03	
Majority		2,230	1.53	
Turnout		145,710	82.03	−0.47
Registered electors		177,633		
TDP gain from INC		Swing		

=== 2004 ===
2004 Andhra Pradesh Legislative Assembly election: Vemuru
Party	Candidate	Votes	%	±%
INC	Satishpaul Raj	52,756	53.40	+14.26
TDP	Alapati Rajendra Prasad	44,035	44.58	−14.29
Majority		8,721	8.82	
Turnout		98,823	82.53	+14.12
Registered electors		119,747		
INC gain from TDP		Swing		

=== 1999 ===
1999 Andhra Pradesh Legislative Assembly election: Vemuru
Party	Candidate	Votes	%	±%
TDP	Alapati Rajendra Prasad	56,523	58.87%	
INC	Alapati Dharma Rao	37,576	39.14%	
Margin of victory		18,947	19.73%	
Turnout		98,018	69.81%	
Registered electors		140,407		
TDP hold		Swing		

=== 1994 ===
1994 Andhra Pradesh Legislative Assembly election: Vemuru
Party	Candidate	Votes	%	±%
TDP	Alapati Rajendra Prasad	46,226	49.76%	
INC	Alapati Dharma Rao	36,302	38.79%	
Margin of victory		10,194	10.97%	
Turnout		94,374	74.06%	
Registered electors		1,27,433		
TDP gain from INC		Swing		

=== 1989 ===
1989 Andhra Pradesh Legislative Assembly election: Vemuru
Party	Candidate	Votes	%	±%
INC	Alapati Dharma Rao	50,779	54.90%	
TDP	Yadlapati Venkata Rao	40,952	44.28%	
Margin of victory		9,827	10.62%	
Turnout		94,726	72.44%	
Registered electors		130,758		
INC gain from TDP		Swing		

=== 1985 ===
1985 Andhra Pradesh Legislative Assembly election: Vemuru
Party	Candidate	Votes	%	±%
TDP	Veeraiah Kodali	43,098	54.39%	
INC	Prasad Rao P.L.V	34,982	44.15%	
Margin of victory		8,116	10.24%	
Turnout		79,998	69.67%	
Registered electors		114,816		
TDP hold		Swing		

=== 1983 ===
1983 Andhra Pradesh Legislative Assembly election: Vemuru
Party	Candidate	Votes	%	±%
TDP	N. Bhaskara Rao	48,268	63.83%	
INC	Yadlapati Venkata Rao	23,623	31.24%	
Margin of victory		24,645	32.59%	
Turnout		76,709	70.22%	
Registered electors		109,247		
TDP gain from INC(I)		Swing		

=== 1978 ===
1978 Andhra Pradesh Legislative Assembly election: Vemuru
Party	Candidate	Votes	%	±%
INC(I)	Yadlapati Venkata Rao	34,624	42.92%	
JP	Veeraiah Kodali	34,118	42.29%	
Margin of victory		506	0.63%	
Turnout		82,095	78.15%	
Registered electors		105,050		
INC(I) gain from SWA		Swing		

=== 1972 ===
1972 Andhra Pradesh Legislative Assembly election: Vemuru
Party	Candidate	Votes	%	±%
SWA	Yadlapati Venkata Rao	29,692	45.22%	
INC	Lankapalli Raghavaiah	28,395	43.24%	
Margin of victory		1,297	1.98%	
Turnout		66,746	75.22%	
Registered electors		88,729		
SWA hold		Swing		

=== 1967 ===
1967 Andhra Pradesh Legislative Assembly election: Vemuru
Party	Candidate	Votes	%	±%
SWA	Yadlapati Venkata Rao	35,130	53.66%	
INC	V.Nannapaneni	30,333	46.34%	
Margin of victory		4,797	7.33%	
Turnout		67,063	83.84%	
Registered electors		79,992		
Swantantra Party gain from INC		Swing		

=== 1962 ===
1962 Andhra Pradesh Legislative Assembly election: Vemuru
Party	Candidate	Votes	%	±%
INC	Kalluri Chandramouli	23,264	43.51%	
SWA	Yadlapati Venkata Rao	16,245	30.38%	
Margin of victory		7,019	13.13%	
Turnout		54,813	77.31%	
Registered electors		70,903		
INC hold		Swing		

=== 1955 ===
1955 Andhra State Legislative Assembly election: Vemuru
Party	Candidate	Votes	%	±%
INC	Kalluri Chandramouli	33,137	67.84%	
CPI	Gorikapudi Joseph	15,709	32.16%	
Margin of victory		17,428	35.68%	
Turnout		48,846	76.98%	
Registered electors		63,450		
INC gain from		Swing		

== See also ==
- List of constituencies of the Andhra Pradesh Legislative Assembly
