= Oleru =

- Village
- Interactive map of Oleru
- Location in Andhra Pradesh, India
- Coordinates: 16°29′32″N 80°00′32″E
- Country: India
- State: Andhra Pradesh
- District: Bapatla
- Mandal: Bhattiprolu

Government
  - Type: Panchayati raj
  - Body: Oleru Gram Panchayat

Area
  - Total: 1,378 ha (3,410 acres)

Population (2011)
  - Total: 3,267
  - Density: 237.1/km^{2} (614.0/sq mi)

Languages
  - Official: Telugu
- Time zone: UTC+5:30 (IST)
- PIN: 522265
- Area code: +91–
- Vehicle registration: AP

Oleru is a village in Bapatla district of the Indian state of Andhra Pradesh. It is the located in Bhattiprolu mandal of Tenali revenue division. It forms a part of Andhra Pradesh Capital Region. It is situated near Krishna River in the Coastal Andhra region of the state.

== Geography ==
Oleru is situated to the southeast of the mandal headquarters, Bhattiprolu, at 16°29′32″N 80°00′32″E. It is spread over an area of 13.78 ha (34.1 acres).

== Governance ==
Oleru gram panchayat is the local self-government of the village. It is divided into wards and each ward is represented by a ward member.

== Education ==
As per the school information report for the academic year 2018–19, the village has a total of 6 schools. These schools include 2 private and 4 Mandal Parishad schools.

== Transport ==
National Highway 216 passes through the village.
