= Pesarlanka =

- Village
- Interactive map of Pesarlanka
- Location in Andhra Pradesh, India
- Coordinates: 16.0937°N 80.8527°E
- Country: India
- State: Andhra Pradesh
- District: Bapatla
- Mandal: Bhattiprolu

Government
  - Type: Panchayati raj
  - Body: Pesarlanka Gram Panchayat

Area
  - Total: 451 ha (1,110 acres)

Population (2011)
  - Total: 2,527
  - Density: 560/km^{2} (1,450/sq mi)

Languages
  - Official: Telugu
- Time zone: UTC+5:30 (IST)
- PIN: 522xxx
- Area code: +91–
- Vehicle registration: AP

Pesarlanka is a village in Bapatla district of the Indian state of Andhra Pradesh. It is the located in Bhattiprolu mandal of Tenali revenue division. It forms a part of Andhra Pradesh Capital Region.

== Geography ==
Pedapulivarru is situated to the east of the mandal headquarters, Bhattiprolu, at 16.0937°N 80.8527°E. It is spread over an area of 451 ha (1,110 acres).

== Demographics ==
As of 2011 census, Pesarlanka had a population of 2,527. The total population constitute, 1,284 males and 1,243 females —a sex ratio of 968 females per 1000 males. 219 children are in the age group of 0–6 years, of which 120 are boys and 99 are girls. The average literacy rate stands at 69.67% with 1,608 literates, significantly higher than the state average of 67.41%.

== Government and politics ==
Pesarlanka gram panchayat is the local self-government of the village. It is divided into wards and each ward is represented by a ward member.

== Economy ==
Agriculture is the main occupation of the villagers. The main crops cultivated by the farmers are banana plantations, green gram, gourd etc.

== Education ==
As per the school information report for the academic year 2018–19, the village has a total of 3 Zilla/Mandal Parishad.
