= Koteswara Rao =

Indian educator (1929–2021)

K. Koteswara Rao
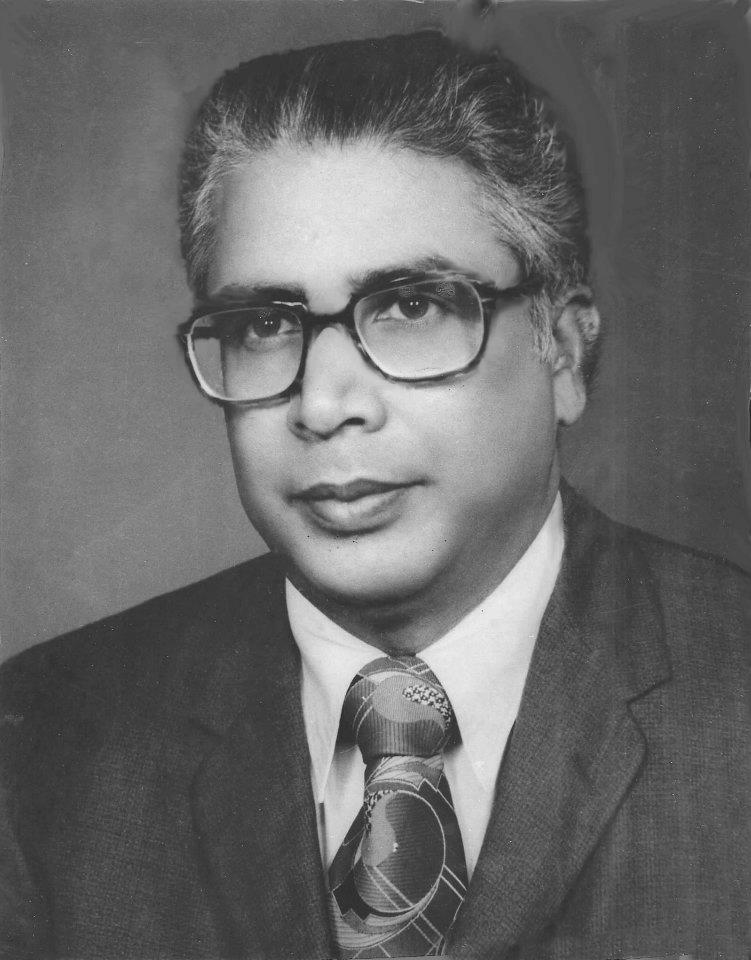
- Born: 19 October 1929; Sangam Jagarlamudi
- Died: 29 September 2021 (aged 91); Visakhapatnam
- Citizenship: Indian
- Education: College of Engineering, Guindy; University of Iowa
- Spouse: Prasunamba
- Children: Prof. K. Madhu Murthy
- Scientific career
- Fields: Civil Engineering
- Workplaces: Public Works Department; Burmah-Shell; Andhra University College of Engineering, Vizag; Regional Engineering College; GITAM University, Vizag
- Doctoral advisor: Hunter Rouse

Kotha Koteswara Rao (19 October 1929 – 29 September 2021) was the principal of the Regional Engineering College, Warangal during the period 1973–1989, which is now renamed as National Institute of Technology, Warangal.

Rao was born in Sangam Jagarlamudi, a village located near Tenali, Andhra Pradesh. He obtained his degree in Civil engineering from the College of Engineering, Guindy, Madras in 1951.

He joined Andhra University College of Engineering as lecturer in 1955. He pursued his master's degree in hydraulics at the University of Iowa and later worked with Dr Hunter Rouse and obtained his doctoral degree also from the University of Iowa in 1966.

Prof. KKR was appointed as the principal of the Regional Engineering College Warangal (RECW) and he kept the institute back on academic track from the state of its turmoil stirred up by radical movement. His was instrumental in making RECW as one of the premier institutes in the country. He is the longest serving and Principal of National Institute of Technology, Warangal.

He was appointed as a member of the committee constituted by central government which made the framework for national regulatory exam for graduate entrance, the Graduate Aptitude Test in Engineering (GATE)

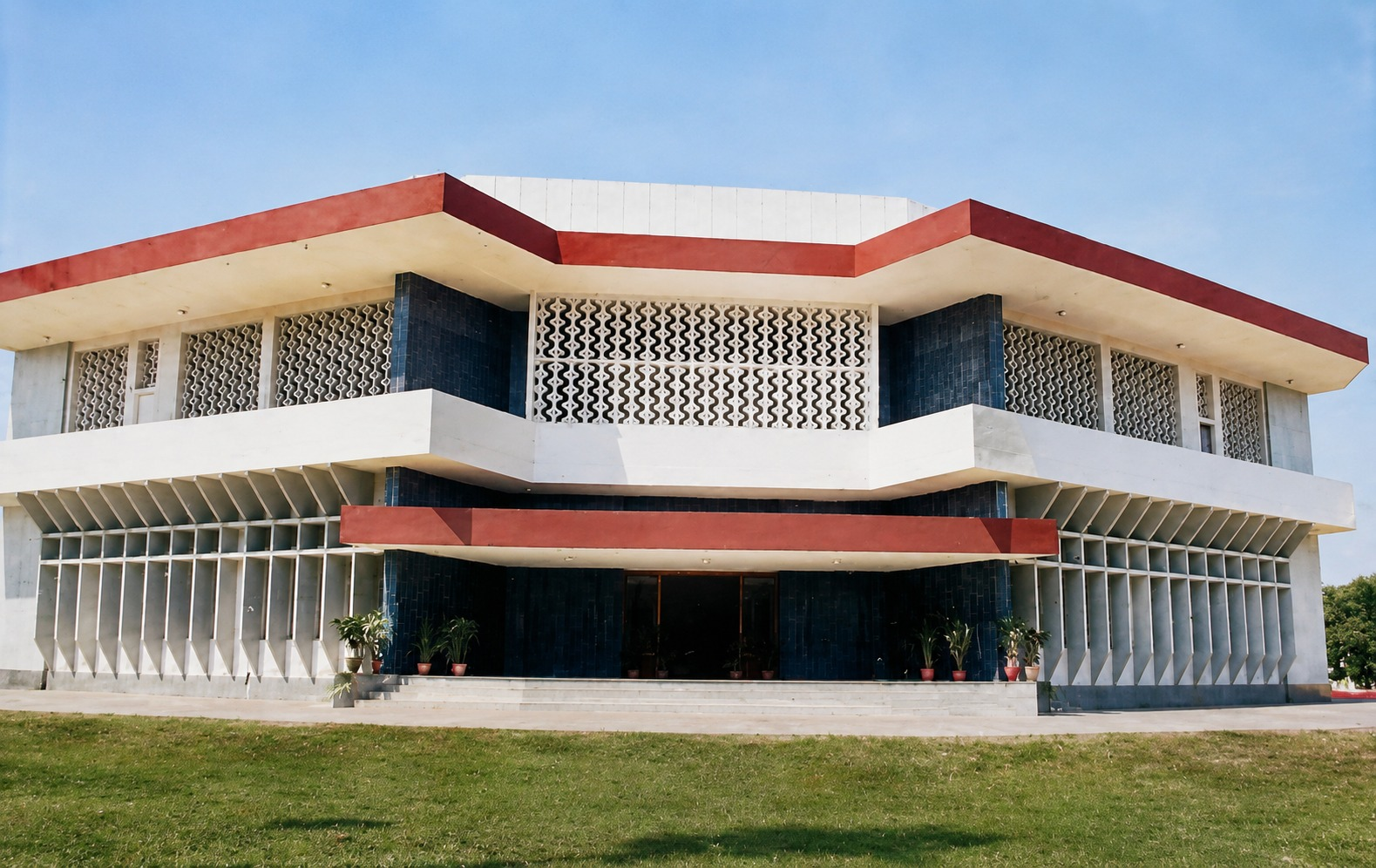
