= Pedapulivarru =

Pedalanka
- Village
- Interactive map of Pedalanka
- Location in Andhra Pradesh, India
- Coordinates: 16.0200°N 80.8500°E
- Country: India
- State: Andhra Pradesh
- District: Bapatla
- Mandal: Bhattiprolu

Government
  - Type: Panchayati raj
  - Body: Pedapulivarru Gram Panchayat

Area
  - Total: 1,562 ha (3,860 acres)

Population (2011)
  - Total: 5,578
  - Density: 357.1/km^{2} (924.9/sq mi)

Languages
  - Official: Telugu
- Time zone: UTC+5:30 (IST)
- PIN: 522257
- Area code: +91–8648
- Vehicle registration: AP

Pedapulivarru is a village in Bapatla district of the Indian state of Andhra Pradesh. It is the located in Bhattiprolu mandal of Tenali revenue division. It forms a part of Andhra Pradesh Capital Region.

== Geography ==
Pedapulivarru is situated to the east of the mandal headquarters, Bhattiprolu, at 16.0200°N 80.8500°E. It is spread over an area of 1,562 ha (3,860 acres).

== Government and politics ==
Pedapulivarru gram panchayat is the local self-government of the village. It is divided into wards and each ward is represented by a ward member.

== Economy ==
The major occupation of the village is agriculture and the crops cultivated include, paddy, banana and turmeric.

== Education ==
As per the school information report for the academic year 2018–19, the village has a total of 7 Zilla/Mandal Parishad Schools.
