= Vellaturu =

- Village
- Interactive map of Vellaturu
- Location in Andhra Pradesh, India
- Coordinates: 16°29′32″N 80°00′32″E
- Country: India
- State: Andhra Pradesh
- District: Bapatla
- Mandal: Bhattiprolu

Government
  - Type: Panchayati raj
  - Body: Vellaturu Gram Panchayat

Area
  - Total: 641 ha (1,580 acres)

Population (2011)
  - Total: 5,956
  - Density: 929/km^{2} (2,410/sq mi)

Languages
  - Official: Telugu
- Time zone: UTC+5:30 (IST)
- PIN: 522xxx
- Area code: +91–
- Vehicle registration: AP

Vellaturu is a village in Bapatla district of the Indian state of Andhra Pradesh. It is the located in Bhattiprolu mandal of Tenali revenue division.

== Geography ==
Vellaturu is situated to the east of the mandal headquarters, Bhattiprolu, at 16°29′32″N 80°00′32″E. It is spread over an area of 641 ha (1,580 acres).

== Demographics ==
As of 2011 census of India, the total number of households in the village were 1,848. It had a total population of 5,956, which includes 2,995 males, 2,961 females and 494 children in the age group of 0–6 years. The average literacy rate stands at 64.37% with 3,516 literates.

== Governance ==
Vellaturu gram panchayat is the local self-government of the village. It is divided into wards and each ward is represented by a ward member. The village forms a part of Andhra Pradesh Capital Region and is under the jurisdiction of APCRDA.

== Education ==
As per the school information report for the academic year 2018–19, the village has a total of 7 schools. These schools include 3 private and 4 Zilla/Mandal Parishad.
