= Sangam Jagarlamudi =

- Village
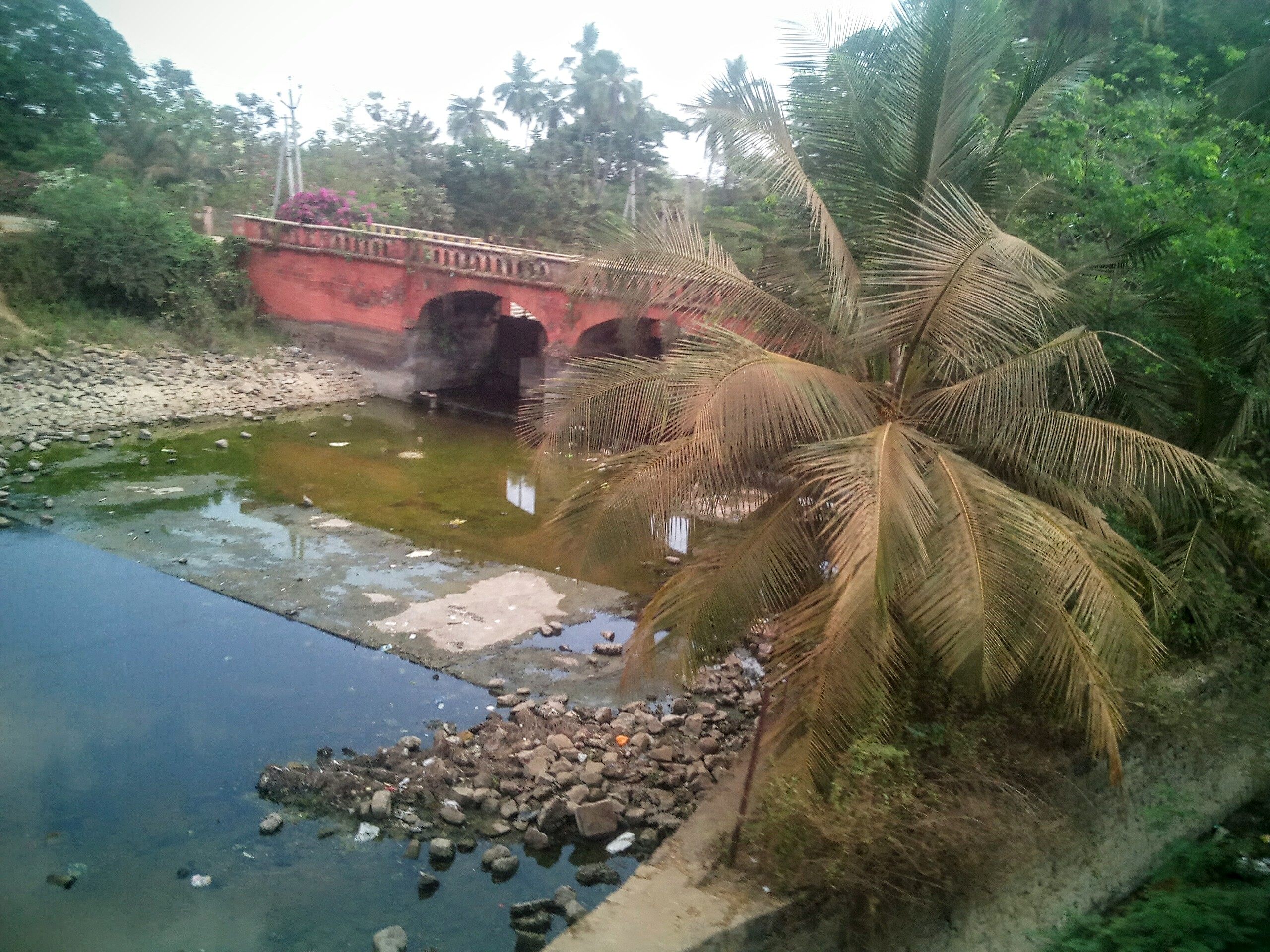
- Kommamuru canal at Sangam Jagarlamudi in Guntur district
- Interactive map of Sangam Jagarlamudi
- Location in Andhra Pradesh, India
- Coordinates: 16°14′25″N 80°34′54″E
- Country: India
- State: Andhra Pradesh
- District: Guntur
- Mandal: Tenali
- Seat: Sangam Jagarlamudi Gram Panchayat

Government
  - Type: Panchayati raj
  - Body: Sangam Jagarlamudi Gram Sabha

Area
  - Total: 1,518 ha (3,750 acres)

Population (2011)
  - Total: 9,246
  - Density: 609.1/km^{2} (1,578/sq mi)

Languages
  - Official: Telugu
- Time zone: UTC+5:30 (IST)
- PIN: 522212
- Area code: +91–8644
- Vehicle registration: AP

Sangam Jagarlamudi is a village in Guntur district of the Indian state of Andhra Pradesh. It is located in Tenali mandal of Tenali revenue division. It forms a part of Andhra Pradesh Capital Region.

== Geography ==
Sangam Jagarlamudi is situated to the west of Tenali, at 16.2396°N 80.5855°E. The village is spread over an area of 3.70 km^{2} (1.43 sq mi). The Buckingham Canal and the Tungabhadra drain confluence near the village. The summer storage tank at the village supplies water to Guntur Municipal Corporation.

== Demographics ==
As of 2011 census, Sangam Jagarlamudi had a population of 5,447. The total population constitute, 2,679 males and 2,768 females —a sex ratio of 1033 females per 1000 males. 482 children are in the age group of 0–6 years, of which 243 are boys and 239 are girls. The average literacy rate stands at 62.62% with 3,709 literates, significantly higher than the state average of 67.41%.

== Government and politics ==
Sangam Jagarlamudigram panchayat is the local self-government of the village. There are 14 wards, each represented by an elected ward member. The present sarpanch is vacant, elected indirectly by the ward members. The village is administered by theTenali Mandal Parishad at the intermediate level of panchayat raj institutions.

== Culture ==
Sangam Jagarlamudi temple of Lord Shiva is a Hindu pilgrimage site and draws many pilgrims during the festival of Maha Shivaratri.

== Transport ==
Tenali–Narakodur road passes through Sangam Jagarlamudi. Rural road connects the village with Selapadu. On this route, APSRTC operates buses from Guntur and Tenali bus stations. Sangam Jagarlamudi railway station provides rail connectivity and is situated on Guntur–Tenali section of Guntur railway division.

== Education ==
As per the school information report for the academic year 2018–19, the village has a total of 7 schools. These include one private and 6 Zilla/Mandal Parishad schools. Sangam Jagarlamudi Zilla Parishad High School is a district council funded school, which provides secondary education in the village.

== Notable people ==
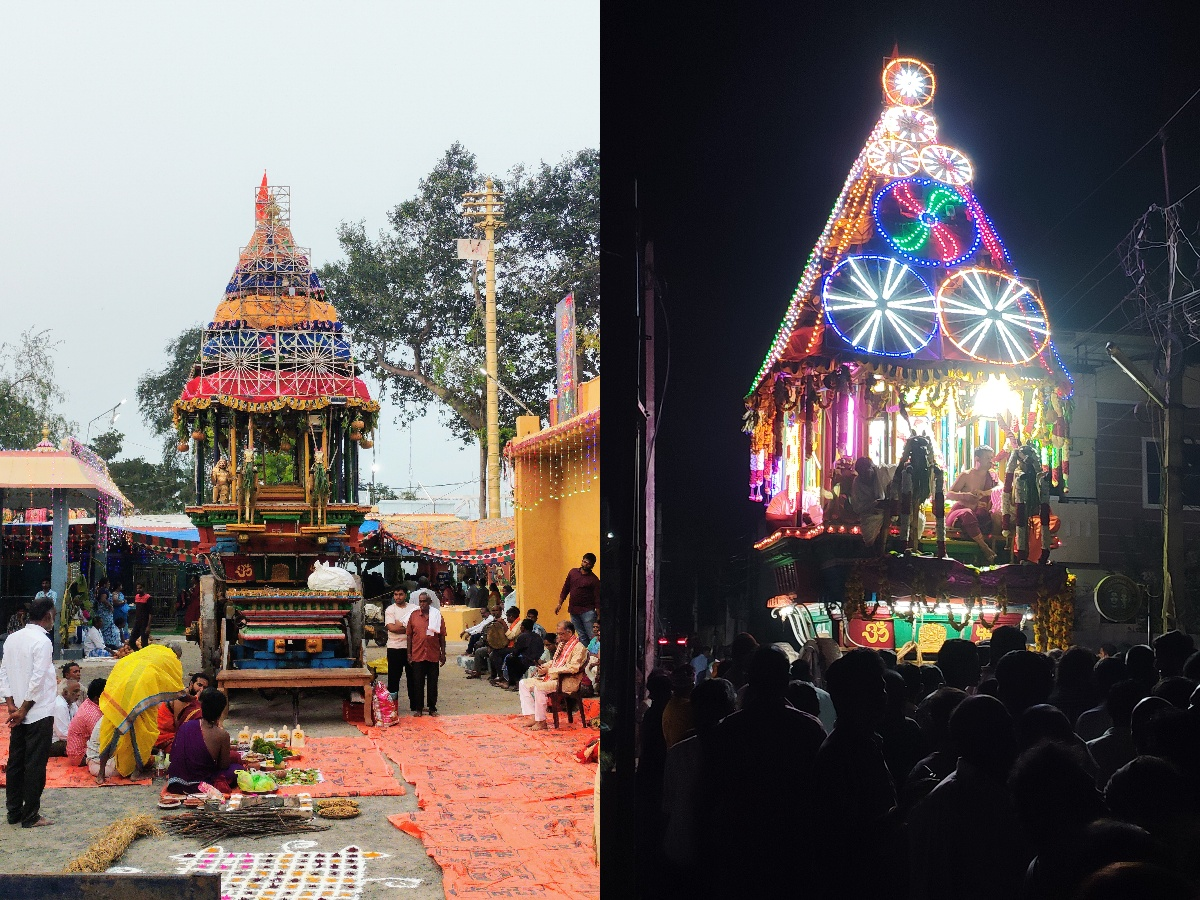

- Paruchuri Kotayya – About 150 years ago, he commissioned the construction of a wooden chariot for Sri Sangameswara Swamy. During the construction of the chariot, when financial difficulties arose, his wife Seethamma Garu tied a turmeric thread around her neck and offered her mangalsutra to support the consecration of the pinnacle (śikhara pratiṣṭha). Elders say that he also initiated the excavation of the Penukudurupadu canal by ploughing. This history is mentioned in the genealogical book "Paruchuri Venkatramayya Gari Vamsam – sankshiptha vivarana," compiled and published in the village by Mr Paruchuri Kutumba Rao.
- Prof. Kotha Koteswara Rao(KKR) – served as the Principal of the Regional Engineering College, Warangal (now renamed the National Institute of Technology, Warangal) and is a renowned educationalist. His son, Prof. Kotha Madhu Murthy, also served as a Professor at NIT Warangal before; later becoming the Chairman of the Andhra Pradesh State Council of Higher Education (APSCHE).

== See also ==
- List of villages in Guntur district
