= Pallikona railway station =

Railway station in Andhra Pradesh, India

Pallikona

General information
- Location: Pallikona, Guntur, Andhra Pradesh; India
- Coordinates: 16.0609°N 80.8043°E
- Owner: Indian Railways
- Operator: Indian Railways
- Line: Tenali–Repalle branch line
- Platforms: 1 side platform
- Tracks: 1
- Train operators: Indian Railways

Construction
- Structure type: Standard (on ground)

Other information
- Station code: POA
- Zone(s): South Central Railway
- Division(s): Guntur
- Classification: E

Services
Preceding station	Indian Railways	Following station
Bhattiprolu towards ?	Tenali–Repalle branch line	Repalle towards ?
Location
- Location within Andhra Pradesh Location within India

Pallikona (station code: POA), is an E-category Indian Railways station in Guntur railway division of South Central Railway zone. It is situated on the Tenali–Repalle branch line and provides rail connectivity to Pallikona.

== History ==
It is a part of Tenali–Repalle branch line, which was constructed in 1916 by Madras and Southern Mahratta Railway.

== Structure and amenities ==
The station has roof top solar panels installed by the Indian railways, along with various railway stations and service buildings in the country, as a part of sourcing 500 MW solar energy.

== See also ==
- List of railway stations in India
