= Bhattiprolu mandal =

- Mandal
- Interactive map of Bhattiprolu mandal
- Location in Andhra Pradesh, India
- Coordinates: 16.1026°N 80.7807°E
- Country: India
- State: Andhra Pradesh
- District: Bapatla
- Headquarters: Bhattiprolu

Government
  - Body: Mandal Parishad
  - Tahsildar: Kalva Lakshmi Prasad

Area
  - Total: 112.92 km^{2} (43.60 sq mi)

Population (2011)
  - Total: 50,252
  - Density: 445.02/km^{2} (1,152.6/sq mi)

Languages
  - Official: Telugu
- Time zone: UTC+5:30 (IST)

Bhattiprolu mandal is one of the 25 mandals in Bapatla district of the Indian state of Andhra Pradesh. It is under the administration of Repalle revenue division and the headquarters are located at Bhattiprolu. The mandal is situated on the banks of Krishna River, bounded by Kollur, Vemuru, Cherukupalle, Nagaram and Repalle mandals. The mandal headquarters ten villages are included in Andhra Pradesh Capital Region.

== Demographics ==
As of 2011 census, the mandal had a population of 50,252. The total population constitute, 25,134 males and 25,118 females —a sex ratio of 999 females per 1000 males. 4,344 children are in the age group of 0–6 years, of which 2,281 are boys and 2,063 are girls. The average literacy rate stands at 70.65% with 32,436 literates.

== Governance ==
The mandal is partially a part of the Andhra Pradesh Capital Region under the jurisdiction of APCRDA. It is under the control of a tahsildar and the present tahsildar is D.V.Subba Rao. Bhattiprolu mandal is one of the 5 mandals under Vemuru (SC) (Assembly constituency), which in turn represents Bapatla (SC) (Lok Sabha constituency) of Andhra Pradesh.

== Settlements ==
As of 2011 census, the mandal has 12 villages and no towns.

The settlements in the mandal are listed below:

1. Addepalli
2. Akkivaripalem
3. Bhattiprolu †
4. Guthavaripalem
5. Gorigapudi
6. Jiluguvaripalem
7. Konetipuram
8. Oleru
9. Pallekona
10. Pedalanka
11. Pedapulivarru
12. Pesarlanka
13. Sivangulapalem
14. Surepalle
15. Vellaturu

Note:†–Mandal headquarter

== Education ==
The mandal plays a major role in education for the rural students of the nearby villages. The primary and secondary school education is imparted by government, aided and private schools, under the School Education Department of the state. As per the school information report for the academic year 2015–16, the mandal has more than 6,040 students enrolled in over 66 schools.

== See also ==
- List of mandals in Andhra Pradesh
- List of villages in Guntur district
