= Vemuru mandal =

- Mandal
- Interactive Map Outlining mandal
- Location in Andhra Pradesh, India
- Coordinates: 16.1775°N 80.7425°E
- Country: India
- State: Andhra Pradesh
- District: Bapatla
- Headquarters: Vemuru

Government
  - Body: Mandal Parishad
  - Tehsildar: A.Koti Reddy

Population (2011)
  - Total: 43,586

Languages
  - Official: Telugu
- Time zone: UTC+5:30 (IST)
- Vehicle registration: AP

Vemuru mandal is one of the 25 mandals in Bapatla district of the state of Andhra Pradesh in India. It is under the administration of Tenali Revenue Division and the headquarters are located at Vemuru. The mandal is bounded by Tenali, Kollipara and Kollur, Amruthalur, Cherukupalle and Bhattiprolu mandals. The mandal is also a part of the Andhra Pradesh Capital Region under the jurisdiction of APCRDA.

== Administration ==
The mandal also forms a part of the Andhra Pradesh Capital Region under the jurisdiction of APCRDA. It is under the control of a tahsildar and the present tahsildar is A.Koti Reddy. Vemuru mandal is one of the 5 mandals under Vemuru (SC) (Assembly constituency), which in turn represents Bapatla (SC) (Lok Sabha constituency) of Andhra Pradesh.

== Towns and villages ==
As of 2011 census, the mandal has 13 villages. Vemuru is the most populated village and Abbanagudavalli is the least populated settlement in the mandal.

The settlements in the mandal are listed below:

1. Abbanagudavalli
2. Balijepalle
3. Chadalawada
4. Chavali
5. Jampani
6. Kuchallapadu
7. Penumarru
8. Peravali
9. Peravalipalem
10. Pothumarru - Vemuru
11. Varahapuram
12. Vemuru
13. Kakarlamudi
14. Buthumali

== Education ==
The mandal plays a major role in education for the rural students of the nearby villages. The primary and secondary school education is imparted by government, aided and private schools, under the School Education Department of the state. As per the school information report for the academic year 2015–16, the mandal has more than 3,601 students enrolled in over 49 schools.

== See also ==
- List of mandals in Andhra Pradesh
- Villages in Vemuru mandal
