= Hunter Rouse =

American physicist

Hunter Rouse (March 29, 1906 – October 16, 1996) was a hydraulician known for his research on the mechanics of fluid turbulence.

Rouse was a faculty member at the Massachusetts Institute of Technology, Cambridge, from 1929 until 1933, when he moved to Columbia University. He was at the California Institute of Technology, Pasadena (1936–1939), and in 1939 he joined the staff of the University of Iowa, Iowa City, where he was dean of the college of engineering from 1966 to 1972. His work includes hydraulic studies of similitude, efflux and overflow, jet diffusion, boundary roughness, and sediment suspension.

Among his written works are Fluid Mechanics for Hydraulic Engineers (1938), Elementary Mechanics of Fluids (1946), Basic Mechanics of Fluids (1953), and History of Hydraulics (1957).

Hunter's eldest son Richard Rouse is one of the world's foremost specialists in Western European History in the Middle Ages.
