= Kakarlapalli =

Coordinates: 18°37′N 79°40′E

- village
- Interactive map of Kakarlapalli
- Country: India
- State: Andhra Pradesh

Languages
  - Official: Telugu
- Time zone: UTC+5:30 (IST)

Kakarlapalli/Kakarlapally is a village in Khammam district in Telangana, India. The name has been derived from the great ancestor kingdom of Telangana region called "Kakatiya".

== Demographics ==
The village population is about 8000.
