= Alapati Dharma Rao =

Alapati Dharma Rao (21 September 1930 – 7 May 2003) was an Indian politician.

== Early life ==
Dharma Rao was born in Annvarapu lanka, Kollipara Mandal, Andhra Pradesh, one of ten children in an agricultural household. He had to walk about 5 kilometres (3.1 mi) everyday to attend his school in the nearby village. He studied his primary education at Chilumur in Sri Rama Rural Gurukul then attended Hindu College (Guntur) between 1952 and 1954. Later he read law at Andhra University, Visakhapatnam. Dharma Rao married A. Nirmalananda Kumari and had four daughters: A. Prabhavati; Nagalla Padmavati; Narravula Sailaja and Koritala Devaki Devi.

== Early career ==
In 1957, Dharma Rao was registered as a lawyer at the Tenali Bar Association and started his practice. He was one of the Correspondents of Chilumuru Sri Rural College and also worked as Tanuku Magistrate. In 1978, Dharma Rao became the President of the Tenali Bar Association.

Later Darma Rao became the chairman of the Nannapaneni Venkat Rao Sugar Factory (Jampani). He also became the Correspondent of V.S.R & N.V.R College. Subsequently he became the President of Tenali Co-Operative Urban Bank twice. Dharma Rao was a member of the Indian National Congress throughout this period.

In 1980s, leprosy was rampant in and around Tenali regions. There were no hospitals and proper medical treatments leaving the infected to their fate. Dharma Rao established a charity organization GRETNALTES (Greater Tenali Leprosy Treatment and Education Scheme Society). GRETNALTES was started in a small room by Dharma Rao using his own money. He purchased an acre of land to construct the centre. The site has since expanded to cover six acres with around 200 staff.

== Political career ==
In 1985, Dharma Rao abandoned his law practice and contested for the first time in the Assembly Elections where he was elected as an MLA for the Duggirala constituency. In 1989 he was elected at the Assembly Elections for the Vemuru Constituency receiving 54.90% of the vote. Under the rule of Marri Chenna Reddy, he took up the positions of Deputy Speaker and Incharge Speaker.

He became Transport Minister under the rule of Kotla Vijay Bhaskar Reddy for a brief stint. Then he took up the position of Home Minister and later Higher Education Minister.

Dharma Rao and Prime Minister PV Narsimha Rao were good friends and participated together in some endeavours.

In 2002, INC appointed Dharma Rao as the chairman for the Drought Committee of Andhra Pradesh. He prepared a report stating there were more than 3.5 million people who had lost employment and 6,900 villagers suffering through no access to drinking water, raising alarm among the politicians.

== Last days ==
Dharma Rao's health deteriorated and he died while undergoing treatment at Medwin Hospitals in Hyderabad on 7 May 2003. In 2007, a statue was unveiled in Tenali in a ceremony attended by Andhra Pradesh chief minister Y.S. Rajasekhara Reddy.
