= Kakarlamudi =

- Village
- Interactive map of Kakarlamudi
- Location in Andhra Pradesh, India
- Coordinates: 16°13′47″N 80°44′7″E
- Country: India
- State: Andhra Pradesh
- District: Bapatla
- Elevation: 11 m (36 ft)

Population (2011)
  - Total: 2,500

Languages
  - Official: Telugu
- Time zone: UTC+5:30 (IST)
- PIN: 522301
- Telephone code: 08644
- Vehicle registration: AP–07
- Lok Sabha constituency: Bapatla
- Vidhan Sabha constituency: Vemuru

Kakarlamudi is a village in the Bapatla district of the Indian state of Andhra Pradesh. It is located in Vemuru mandal of Tenali revenue division.

== Geography ==
Kakarlamudi is located at 14.25° N 80.58° E. It has an average elevation of 11 metres (36 ft).

== Governance ==
Kakarlamudi gram panchayat is the local self-government of the village. The gram panchayat was awarded Nirmala Grama Puraskaram for the year 2013.
