= Telugu Raithu =

Telugu Raithu తెలుగు రైతు
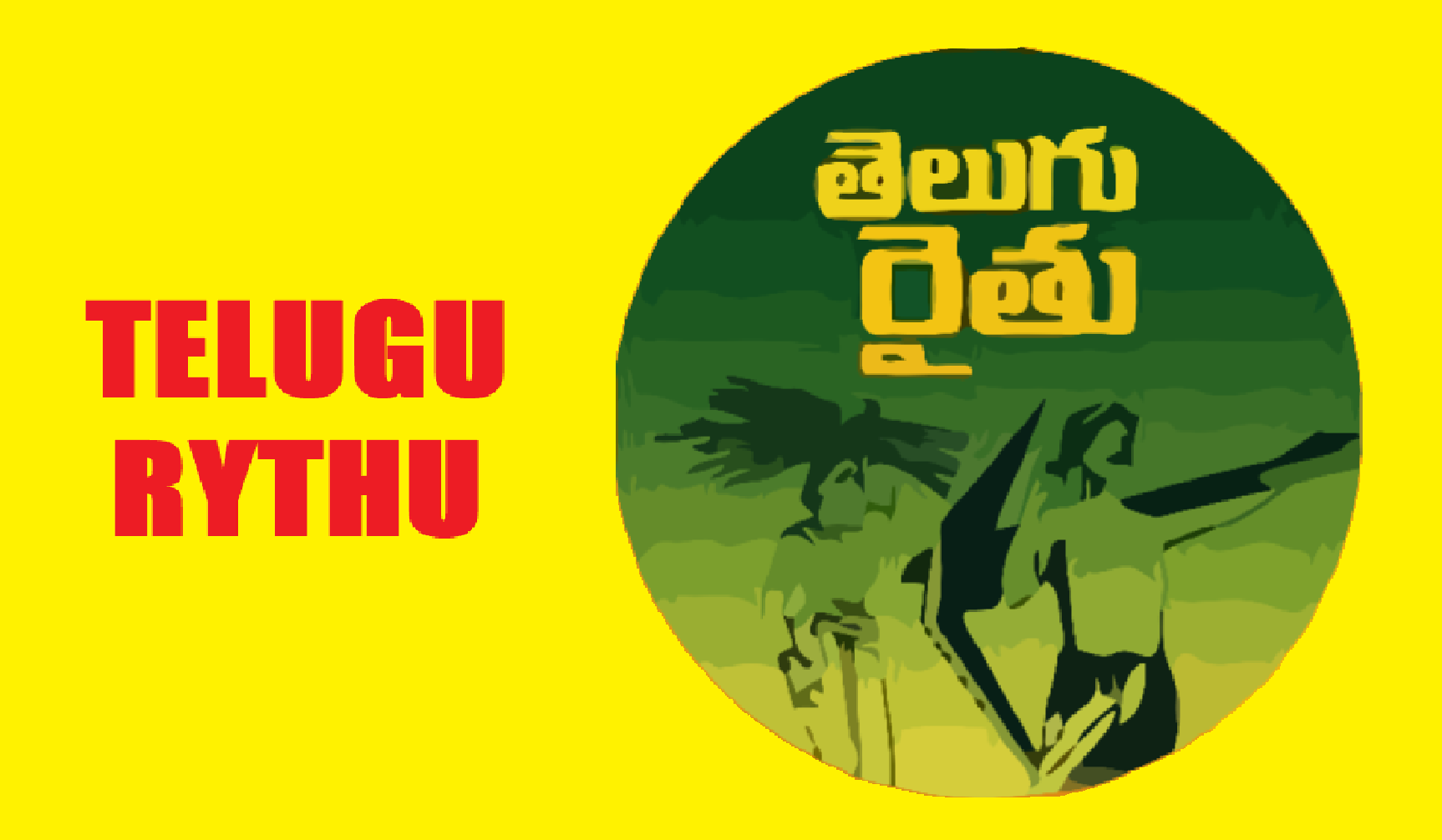
- President: Marreddy Srinivas Reddy

Telugu Raithu is the farmers' wing of the Telugu Desam Party.

== Former presidents ==
- Nallamala Venkateswara Rao (2014)
