= Nakka Ananda Babu =

Indian politician

Member of Legislative Assembly Andhra Pradesh
- Incumbent
- Assumed office 4 June 2024
- Preceded by: Merugu Nagarjuna
- Constituency: Vemuru
- In office 16 May 2009 – 25 May 2019
- Preceded by: Satishpaul Raj
- Succeeded by: Merugu Nagarjuna
- Constituency: Vemuru

Minister of Social Welfare Government of Andhra Pradesh
- In office 2 April 2017 – 29 May 2019
- Governor: E. S. L. Narasimhan
- Chief Minister: N. Chandrababu Naidu
- Preceded by: Ravela Kishore Babu
- Succeeded by: Pinipe Viswarup

Minister of Tribal Welfare Government of Andhra Pradesh
- In office 2 April 2017 – 10 November 2018
- Governor: E. S. L. Narasimhan
- Chief Minister: N. Chandrababu Naidu
- Preceded by: Ravela Kishore Babu
- Succeeded by: Kidari Sravan Kumar

Minister of Cinematography Government of Andhra Pradesh
- In office 11 November 2018 – 29 May 2019
- Governor: E. S. L. Narasimhan
- Chief Minister: N. Chandrababu Naidu
- Preceded by: N. Chandrababu Naidu (Chief Minister)
- Succeeded by: Perni Venkataramaiah

Personal details
- Born: 10 September 1966 (age 59): Guntur, Andhra Pradesh, India
- Party: Telugu Desam Party
- Spouse: N. Satya Ratna Kumari
- Children: N. Akhilesh, N. Akash
- Parents: N. Nagendram (father); N. Pushpavathi (mother)

Nakka Ananda Babu (born 10 September 1966) is an Indian politician from the State of Andhra Pradesh. He was elected to Andhra Pradesh Legislative Assembly for two terms in 2009 and 2014 but lost in 2019 from Vemuru. He regained the Vemuru seat winning the 2024 Andhra Pradesh Legislative Assembly election.

== Early life and education ==
Babu is from Guntur. He was born to Nagendram and Pushpavathi. His wife, Nakka Satya Ratna Kumari, is a teacher. He completed his Bachelor's degree in Law in 1995 at Andhra University, Visakhapatnam. He is an advocate.

== Career ==
Babu served as the Social welfare, Tribal welfare Minister from 2017 to 2019. In October 2020, he was appointed Politburo Member of Telugu Desam Party by TDP National President N. Chandrababu Naidu. He won the 2024 Andhra Pradesh Legislative Assembly election from Vemuru Constituency on the Telugu Desam Party ticket which had an alliance with Bharatiya Janata Party and Jana Sena Party. He polled 94,922 votes and defeated Varikuti Ashok Babu of YSR Congress Party by a margin of 22,021 votes.
