= Kalluri Chandramouli =

Indian politician (1898–1992)

- Born: 15 November 1898; Moparru, British India
- Died: 21 January 1992 (aged 93)
- Occupations: Independence activist, philanthropist
- Website: Official website

Kalluri Chandramouli (Telugu: కల్లూరి చంద్రమౌళి; 15 November 1898 – 21 January 1992) was an Indian politician and independence activist from the state of Andhra Pradesh, South India. He held ministerial posts in three states: Madras State, Andhra State and Andhra Pradesh. Served as the Minister of Endowments and as the President of the Board of Trustees of Tirumala Tirupati Devasthanam. He renovated Srisailam and Bhadrachalam temples.

== Biography ==
Chandramouli was born on 15 November 1898 in a village Moparru, British India. He was educated in Scotland and acquired a post-graduate degree in agriculture. Upon his return to India, he joined the independence movement in 1926. As a member of the Indian National Congress he became president of the Guntur district Congress Committee. He was imprisoned several times by the British government throughout his term. He was then elected as a member of the Legislative Assemblies from Tenali of Madras province in 1937 and again in 1946. He was elected for the same position for the Andhra province in 1955 and the Andhra Pradesh province in 1962.

Chandramouli refused to work in the British government and participated in the freedom struggle of the country. In 1926 Warda went to Sevagram and met Gandhiji. After staying there for three months, he became a Congress worker and came to Guntur. In 1929, he accompanied Gandhiji on his tour of Guntur district and took his native village Moparru to collect donations for the freedom struggle. He participated in all the national movements under the leadership of Mahatma Gandhi and went to jail several times.

He was arrested for participating in the salt satyagraha and spent 18-6-1930 to 12-3 1931 in Rayavellour Jail. He spent time in CuddaloreJail from 25-2-1932 to 24-2-1933 for civil disobedience by making salt in Konda Venkatappayya's house in Guntur. In December 1933 Gandhiji went on Harijan Yatra in Andhra. Chandramouli Anni Tanai made it a success during their visit to Guntur. Kavuru Vinayasram was inaugurated by Gandhiji on 23 December 1933 and the temple was entered by Harijans in many villages.

In 1934, he became the President of Guntur District Congress Committee. In 1938 he was elected as the President of the District Board.

In 1940, he started a satyagraha in Kuchipudi village along with freedom fighters like Kala Venkatarao, Saranu Ramaswamy Chaudhary and Manthina Venkata Raju .

In 1942, on the call of Congress, the Quit India Movement started across the country. During that movement, a peaceful struggle started on September 12, 1942 in Tenali under the leadership of Chandramouli turned out of control and became violent. Seven activists were killed in police firing when the protesters who set Tenali railway station on fire were targeting the taluka office. 'Rana Ranga Chowk ' was built in Tenali in 1959 as a memorial to them .

Chandramouli and many others were arrested for leading this movement. He spent two years in the Raivellur Jail.

He was elected as a member of the Constituent Assembly (First Parliament) of India formed in 1946 from Madras Provincial and served as a member of the Indian Constitution for two years.

== Political career ==
Kalluri Chandramouli was elected to the Legislative Assembly in both 1937 and 1946, serving as a legislator in the Madras Province. He subsequently held ministerial positions in several cabinets:

- Minister of Institutions and Co-operatives (1947-1949): O. P. Ramaswami Reddyar Cabinet, Union Madras State
- Minister of Revenue and Devadaya (1955-1956): Bejawada Gopal Reddy Cabinet, Andhra State
- Devadaya Sakha Minister (1960-1962): Damodaram Sanjeevaiah Cabinet, Andhra Pradesh

Chandramouli was also involved in religious and educational institutions, serving as:

- President of Tirumala Tirupati Devasthanam (1964)
- President of the Ramalaya Development Association (1964)
- Member of the Governing Council of Sri Venkateswara University

== Awards ==
- In 1956, the title of 'Arsha Vidyalankara' in Tanuku.
- The colony built and housed in Guntur with his help was named Chandramouli Nagar .
- In 1991, he was awarded the 'Independence Sainik Sanman' by the Central Government
- Bronze statues of Chandramouli were installed in Guntur and Moparru.

== Books ==
Kallur Chandramouli wrote many books on Ramayana, Vedas, Constitutions of different countries, Religion, Temples.
