= Guntur Junction railway station =

Railway station in Andhra Pradesh, India

Guntur Junction
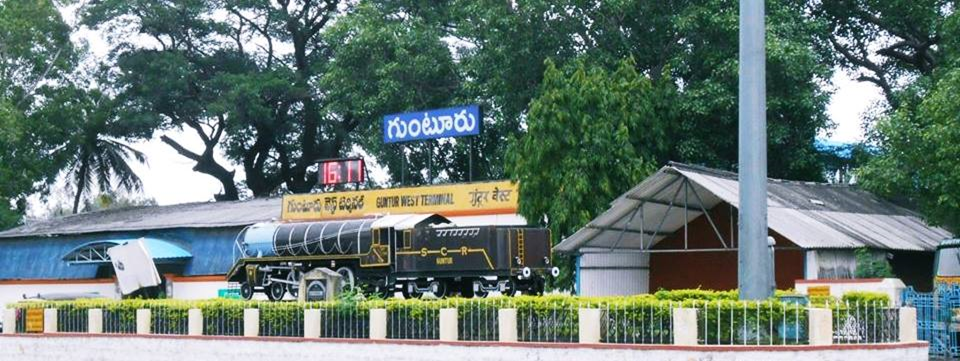
- Guntur railway station west terminal

General information
- Location: Station Road E, Sambasiva Pet, Guntur, Guntur district, Andhra Pradesh; India
- Coordinates: 16.3008°N 80.4428°E
- Elevation: 31.89 metres (104.6 ft)
- Owner: Indian Railways
- Operator: South Coast Railway zone
- Lines: Guntur–Repalle section; Guntur–Krishna Canal section; Guntur–Macherla section; Pagidipalli–Nallapadu section; Nallapadu–Nandyal section
- Platforms: 8
- Tracks: 10
- Connections: Bus stand, Taxi stand.

Construction
- Structure type: On ground
- Parking: Available
- Accessible: Available

Other information
- Status: Active
- Station code: GNT
- Zone(s): South Coast Railway
- Division(s): Guntur

History
- Opened: 1916
- Electrified: 1989

Passengers
- 37 million approx

Services
| Preceding station | Indian Railways | Following station |
|---|---|---|
| Terminus | Guntur–Krishna Canal section | Pedakakani Halt towards ? |
| Terminus | Guntur–Tenali section | Vejendla towards ? |
| Nallapadu towards ? | Guntur–Nallapadu section | Terminus |
Location
- Location within Andhra Pradesh
- Interactive map

Guntur Junction railway station (station code:GNT) is an Indian Railways station in Guntur of Andhra Pradesh. It is situated on the Krishna Canal–Guntur section of Guntur railway division in the South coast railway zone.

== History ==
The first rail lines in Guntur are of metre-gauge line opened Guntur–Repalle section in year 1916 and later between Guntur and Hubli/Goa.Later a broad-gauge rail line was built between GNT/VJA towards Howrah with the completion of Prakasam Barrage on River Krishna. By the end of the 20th century Guntur had 4 different railway lines passing through its junction.That railway lines is Guntur–Tenali section, Guntur–Vijayawada section, Guntur–Nallapadu-Guntakal section, Guntur–Nallapadu–Pagidipalli section.

== Structure and amenities ==
Guntur railway station has seven platforms and two entrances, namely the East and the West. These platforms are interconnected by subway system. The station is equipped with facilities, such as dormitories, parcel office, retiring rooms, drinking water, booking counters, refreshment stalls, separate pathways for public, rampways for disabled people, parking zone for car and auto rickshaws etc. Railways has formulated a plan to make station passenger friendly. A guidance system has been put in place in the station in which entry and exit points were numbered and major landmarks of the city have been displayed in foot-over-bridges. On average the station handles 43000 passengers daily and to facilitate easy movement multiple entry and exit gates are on both sides. The main entrance located at Railpet side is known as Guntur Government Hospital gate, and leads to platform 1.This entrance has been also named as terminal 1 and has gate numbers 1 to 7. The rear entrance is also known as Arundalpet side and is called terminal 2. Work is in progress for extension of platform no.8 and 9, to accommodate new trains at the railway station. In addition directional boards on the station premises helps in guidance of passengers.

== Classification ==
Guntur Junction railway station is an NSG-1-category station. It is recognized as a Model station, Adarsh station and Touch & Feel (Modern Stations) in the Guntur railway division.

== Performance and earnings ==
As of September 2014, the station served thousands of commuting population by a total of 33 trains, of which 7 are MEMU and local trains.

== See also ==
- List of railway stations in India
