= Repalle railway station =

Railway station in Repalle, India

Repalle
- Repalle railway station signboard

General information
- Location: Repalle, Bapatla district, Andhra Pradesh; India
- Coordinates: 16.110°N 80.4943°E
- Owner: Government of India
- Operator: Indian Railways
- Line: Tenali–Repalle branch line
- Platforms: 2
- Tracks: 2
- Train operators: Indian Railways

Construction
- Structure type: Terminus
- Accessible: Disabled access

Other information
- Status: Active
- Station code: RAL
- Zone(s): South Coast Railway
- Division(s): Guntur
- Classification: D

History
- Opened: 12/11/1954

Services
Preceding station	Indian Railways	Following station
Pallikona towards ?	Repalle	Terminus
Location
- Location within Andhra Pradesh Location within India

Repalle railway station (station code:RAL), is a D-category Indian Railways station in Guntur railway division of South Central Railway zone. It is situated on the Tenali–Repalle branch line and provides rail connectivity to the town of Repalle. It is one of the stations in the division to be equipped with Automatic Ticket Vending Machines (ATVM's).

== History ==
Repalle railway station started its operations in the year 1916, due to the opening of Guntur–Repalle broad-gauge section via Tenali. It was under the then, Madras and Southern Mahratta Railway. Present this station operates trains to Tenali and Secunderabad stations In 2012–13, a survey report was submitted for new Machilipatnam–Repalle railway line. The most trains from Repalle are via Tenali Junction railway station because it was a commercial stop here.

== Structure and amenities ==
The station has roof top solar panels installed by the Indian railways, along with various railway stations and service buildings in the country, as a part of sourcing 500 MW solar energy.

== Originating express trains ==
Train No.	Train Name	Destination	Departure	Running	Route
17646	Repalle - Secunderabad Express	Secunderabad Jn.	07:10	All Days	Tenali Jn., Guntur Jn., Nalgonda., Charlapalli.
17626	Delta Express	Vikarabad	22:40	All Days	Tenali Jn., Guntur Jn., Ghatkesar (Via Nalgonda)., Secundrabad Jn., Lingampalli.

== See also ==
- List of railway stations in India
