= Tenali Junction railway station =

Railway Station in Andhra Pradesh

Tenali Junction
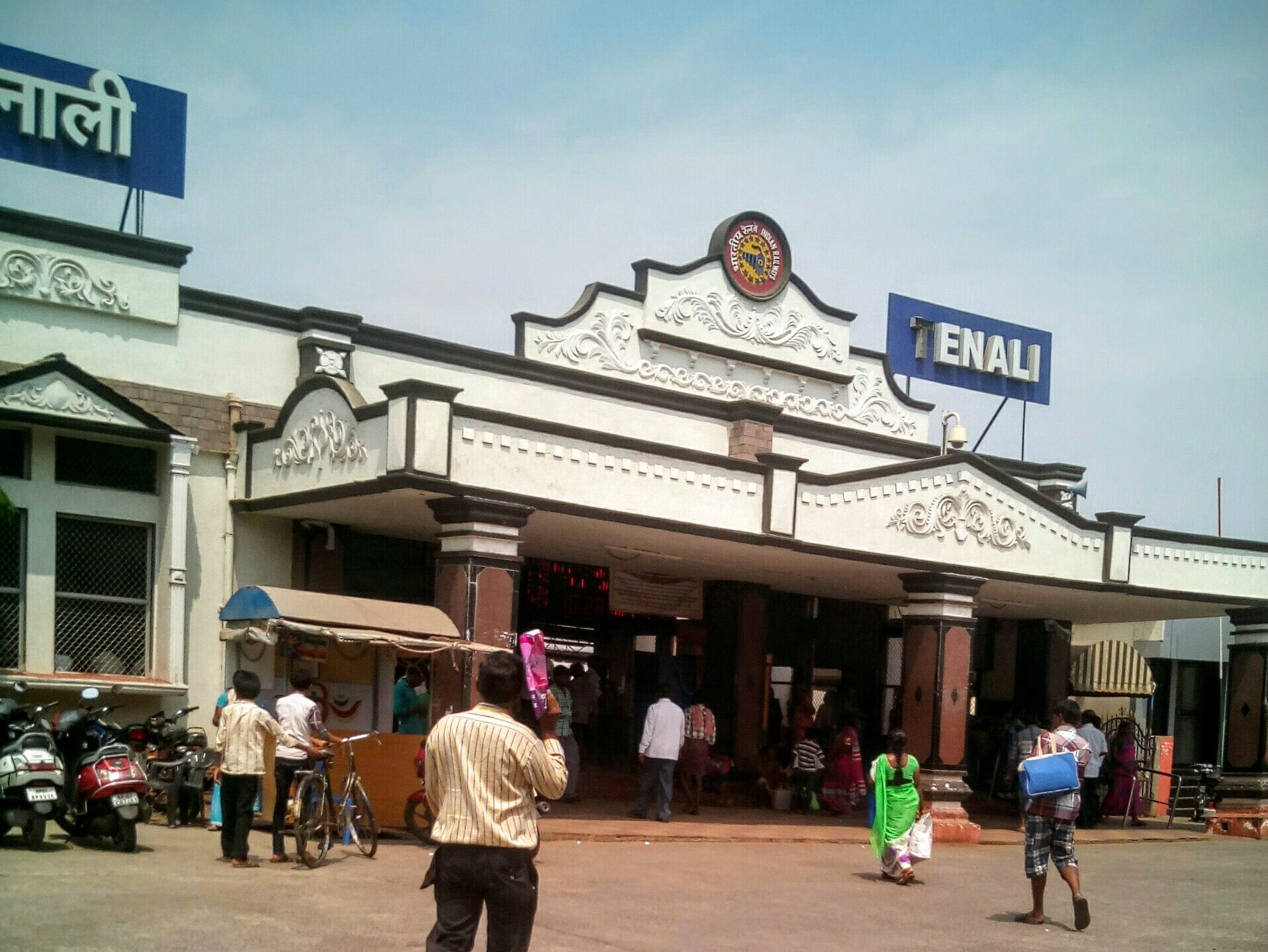
- Tenali railway station main entrance

General information
- Location: Tenali, Guntur district, Andhra Pradesh; India
- Coordinates: 16°14′33″N 80°38′24″E
- System: Commuter, Inter-city and Regional rail station
- Owner: Indian Railways
- Operator: Indian Railways
- Lines: Howrah–Chennai main line; New Delhi–Chennai main line; Guntur–Tenali section; Tenali–Repalle branch line; Macherla–Tenali section
- Platforms: 5
- Tracks: 8 5 ft 6 in (1,676 mm) broad gauge

Construction
- Structure type: Standard (on ground)
- Accessible: Disabled access

Other information
- Status: Active
- Station code: TEL
- Zone(s): SCoR
- Division(s): Vijayawada
- Classification: Non-Suburban Grade-3 (NSG-3)

History
- Opened: 1899
- Electrified: 1980–81

Services
Preceding station	Indian Railways	Following station
Vijayawada towards ?	New Delhi–Chennai main line	Nidubrolu towards ?
Vijayawada towards ?	Howrah–Chennai main line	Nidubrolu towards ?
Angalakuduru towards ?	Guntur–Tenali section	Terminus
Terminus	Tenali–Repalle branch line	Chinnaravuru towards ?
Route map
Location
- Location within India Location within Andhra Pradesh
- Interactive map

Tenali Junction railway station (station code:TEL) is an Indian Railways station in Tenali of Andhra Pradesh. It is administered under Vijayawada railway division of South Coast Railway zone (formerly South Central Railway zone).

== History ==
The Vijayawada–Chennai Central link was established in 1899. The Howrah–Chennai main line was constructed by Madras and Southern Mahratta Railway and was opened in January 1916. The Vijayawada–Tenali section was electrified in 1979–80.

== Classification ==
In terms of earnings and outward passengers handled, Tenali is categorized as a Non-Suburban Grade-3 (NSG-3) railway station. Based on the re–categorization of Indian Railway stations for the period of 2017–18 and 2022–23, an NSG–3 category station earns between ₹120–₹200 crore and handles 15–25 million passengers. The station serves about 10 lakh passengers, over 250 express and 170 freight trains every day.[4] On 1 November 1899, the broad-gauge line was constructed between Vijayawada and Chennai, making rail journey between Chennai, Mumbai, Visakhapatnam, Howrah, New Delhi and Hyderabad possible. Tenali Junction is main station in the Tenali city and is one of the busiest railway stations in Andhra Pradesh. The city also has 3 local stations of Anglakuduru, Chinnaravur, and Kolakaluru; these are served as satellite stations of Tenali.

== Structure and amenities ==
The modernization of the station was taken by providing new escalators, lifts etc. SCR installed Automatic Ticket Vending Machines (ATVMs) in the station.

== Trains Passing Through Tenali Railway Junction ==
Being a junction, trains with destinations toward Gudur, Vijayawada, Guntur and Repalle pass through Tenali. Several Passenger and Express Trains are available round the clock. Vande Bharat train from Narasapur to MGR Chennai Central (via Renigunta) stops at Tenali.
