= Bhattiprolu =

- Village
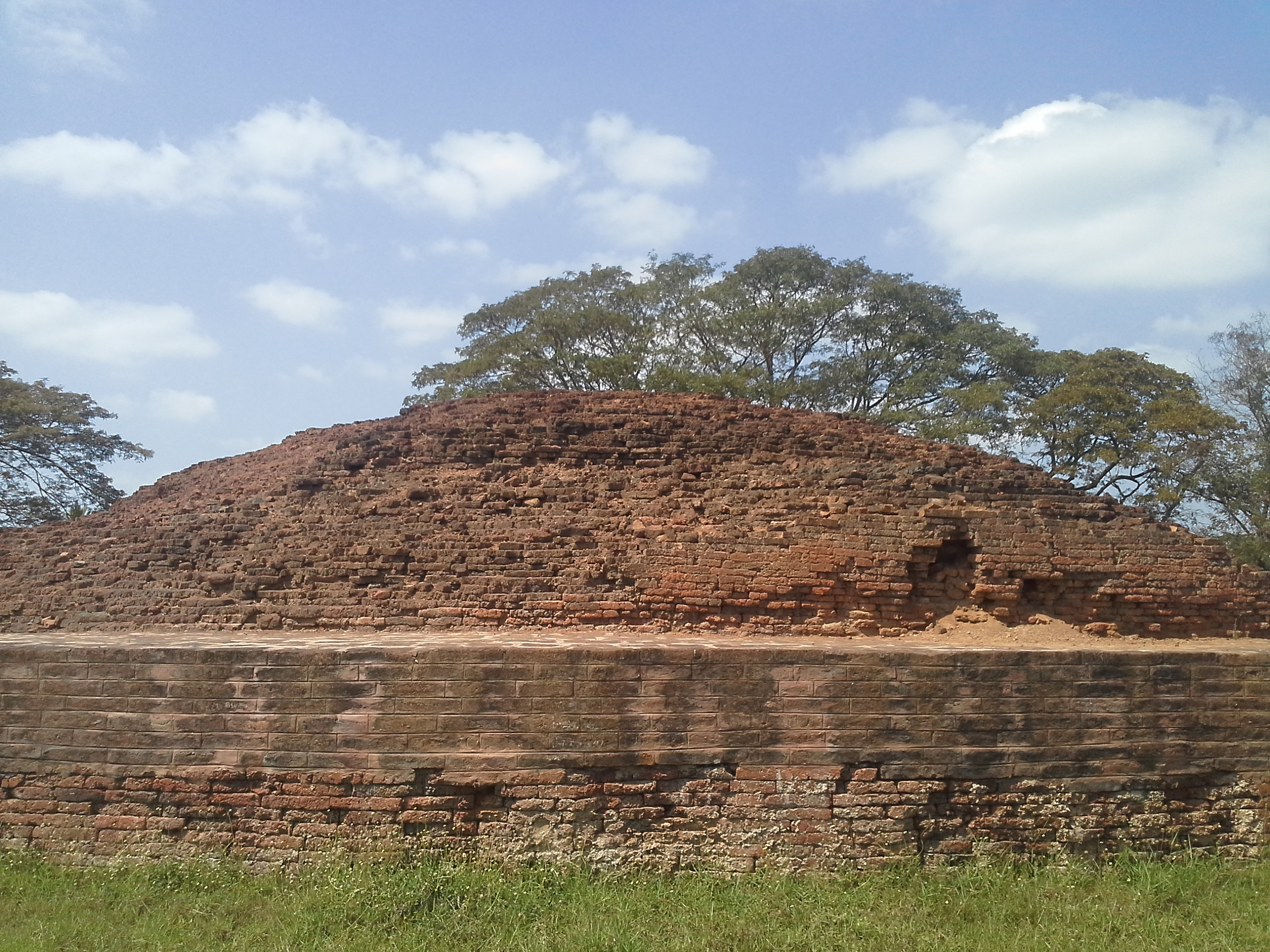
- Buddhist Maha Stupa at Bhattiprolu
- Interactive map of Bhattiprolu
- Location in Andhra Pradesh, India Bhattiprolu (Andhra Pradesh)
- Coordinates: 16.1026°N 80.7807°E
- Country: India
- State: Andhra Pradesh
- District: Bapatla
- Mandal: Bhattiprolu

Government
  - Type: Panchayati raj
  - Body: Bhattiprolu Gram Panchayat

Area
  - Total: 2,515 ha (6,210 acres)

Population (2011)
  - Total: 11,092
  - Density: 441.0/km^{2} (1,142/sq mi)

Languages
  - Official: Telugu
- Time zone: UTC+5:30 (IST)
- PIN: 522256
- Area code: +91–
- Vehicle registration: AP

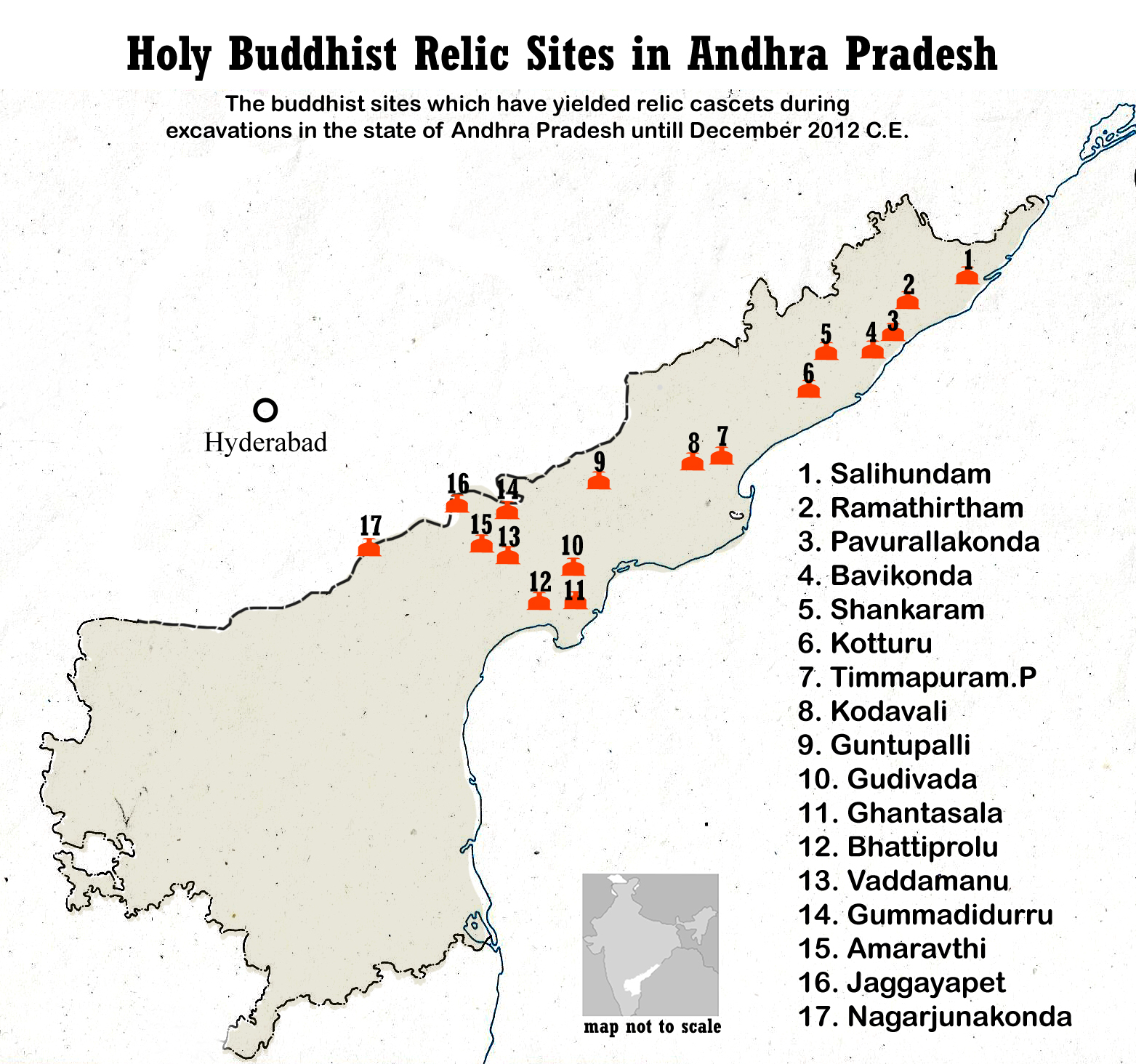
Bhattiprolu is one of the Holy relic sites of Andhra Pradesh

Bhattiprolu is a village in Bapatla district of the Indian state of Andhra Pradesh. It is the headquarters of Bhattiprolu mandal in Repalle revenue division. The Buddhist stupa in the village is one of the centrally protected monuments of national importance. One of the earliest evidence of Brahmi script in South India comes from Bhattiprolu. The script was written on an urn containing Shakyamuni Buddha's relics. The script has been named Bhattiprolu script.

== History ==
The original name of Bhattiprolu was Pratipalapura, a flourishing town in the ancient Sala kingdom that predated Andhra Satavahanas. From available inscriptional evidence, King Kuberaka was ruling over Bhattiprolu around 230 BCE. Bhattiprolu is well known for its Buddha stupa (Vikramarka kota dibba) built about 3rd-2nd century BCE.

== Geography ==
It is spread over an area of 2,515 ha (6,210 acres).

== Government and politics ==
Bhattiprolu gram panchayat is the local self-government of the village. The village forms a part of Andhra Pradesh Capital Region and is under the jurisdiction of APCRDA.

== Transport ==
The village has connectivity with National Highway 216 (India) which passes through the village. APSRTC operates buses from Tenali and Repalle via Bhattiprolu. Bhattiprolu railway station is located on Tenali–Repalle branch line and administered under Guntur railway division of South Central Railway zone.

== Education ==
As per the school information report for the academic year 2018–19, the village has a total of 14 schools. These include 4 MPP, one other type and 9 private schools.

== See also ==
- Bhattiprolu alphabet
