= Guntur–Tenali section =

Indian rail section

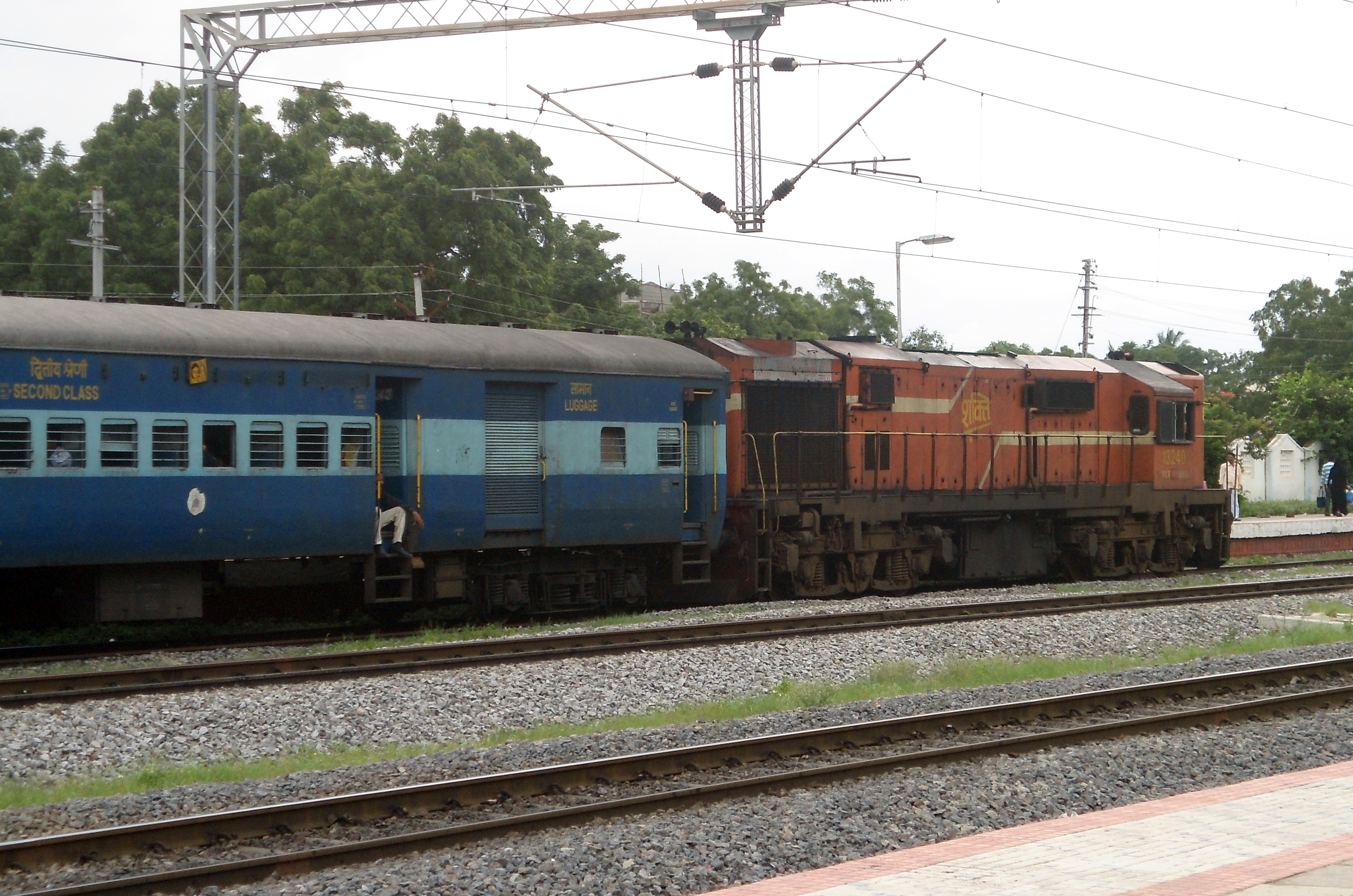
- Repalle Delta Passenger runs on this route

Overview
- Status: Operational
- Owner: Indian Railways
- Locale: Andhra Pradesh
- Termini: Guntur; Tenali

Service
- Operator: South Coast Railway

History
- Opened: 1916

Technical
- Line length: 25.47 km (15.83 mi)
- Number of tracks: 2
- Track gauge: 5 ft 6 in (1,676 mm) broad gauge
- Electrification: Yes

The Guntur–Tenali section connects Guntur and Tenali of Guntur district in the Indian state of Andhra Pradesh. It intersects Howrah–Chennai main line at Tenali. The section is an electrified double-track railway, with the second line opened on 26 April 2019.

== History ==
Guntur–Tenali section, a part of Guntur–Repalle broad gauge project was opened in 1916, which was then owned by Madras and Southern Mahratta Railway.

== Jurisdiction ==
The section covers a total length of 25.47 km (15.83 mi) and is administered under Guntur railway division, excluding Tenali which falls under Vijayawada railway division of South Coast Railway zone.
