= Tenali–Repalle branch line =

Railway line in India

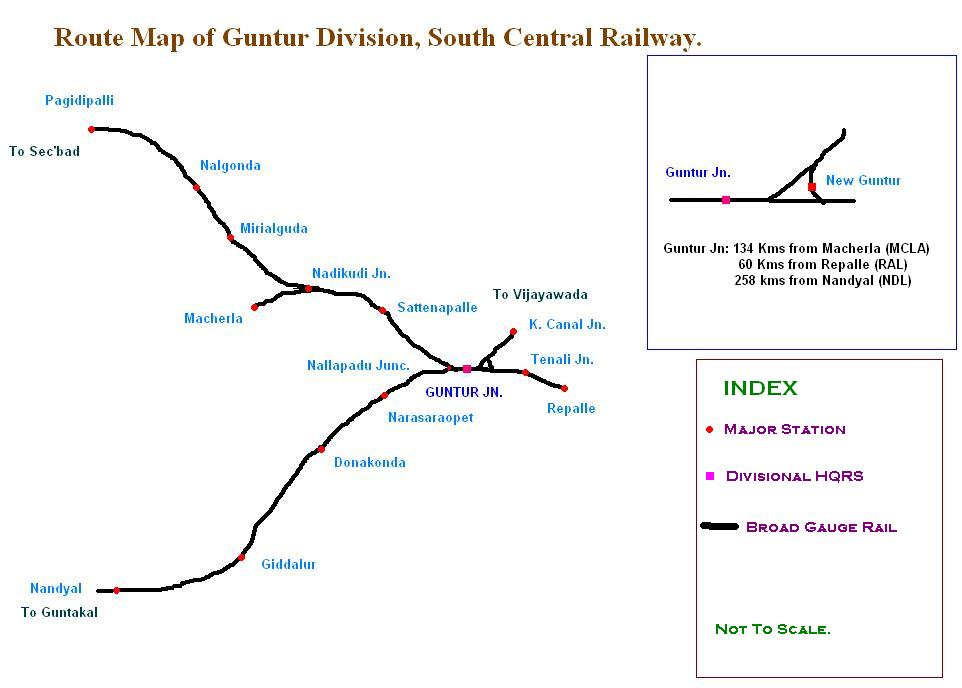
- Schematic diagram showing Tenali–Repalle branch line of Guntur Railway Division

Overview
- Status: Operational
- Owner: Indian Railways
- Locale: Andhra Pradesh
- Termini: Tenali; Repalle
- Stations: 6

Service
- System: Indian Railways
- Operator(s): Guntur division of South Coast Railway zone

History
- Opened: 1916; 109 years ago

Technical
- Line length: 32.10 km (19.95 mi)
- Number of tracks: 1
- Character: At-grade street running
- Track gauge: 5 ft 6 in (1,676 mm) broad gauge
- Electrification: Yes
- Operating speed: 100 km/h (62 mph)

Tenali–Repalle branch line is a electrified single track railway section in South Central Railway zone. It connects Tenali and Repalle of Guntur district in the Indian state of Andhra Pradesh. Further, this section intersects Howrah–Chennai main line and Guntur–Tenali section at Tenali. Electrification of the section will be taken and the budget for the same was allocated in the year 2018–19.

== History ==
Tenali–Repalle branch line, a part of Guntur–Repalle broad-gauge project was opened in January 1916, which was then owned by Madras and Southern Mahratta Railway.

== Jurisdiction ==
This branch line is having a length of 33.85 km (21.03 mi) and is administered under Guntur railway division, excluding Tenali which falls under Vijayawada railway division of South Coast Railway zone.
