= Dhulipalla =

Dhulipalla or Dhulipala is a Telugu surname. Notable people with the surname include:

- Dhulipalla Narendra Kumar (born 1967), Indian politician
- Dhulipalla Veeraiah Chowdary (1942–1994), Indian politician
- Sobhita Dhulipala (born 1992), Indian actress
