= Tsunduru mandal =

- Mandal
- Interactive Map Outlining mandal
- Location in Andhra Pradesh, India
- Coordinates: 16.1583°N 80.583°E
- Country: India
- State: Andhra Pradesh
- District: Bapatla
- Headquarters: Tsunduru

Government
  - Body: Mandal Parishad
  - Tehsildar: I.Edward

Area
  - Total: 104.84 km^{2} (40.48 sq mi)

Population (2011)
  - Total: 45,778
  - Density: 436.65/km^{2} (1,130.9/sq mi)

Languages
  - Official: Telugu
- Time zone: UTC+5:30 (IST)

Tsunduru mandal is one of the 25 mandals in Bapatla district of the Indian state of Andhra Pradesh. It is under the administration of Tenali revenue division and the headquarters are located at Tsunduru. The mandal is bounded by Chebrolu, Tenali, Amruthalur and Ponnur mandals. The mandal is a part of Andhra Pradesh Capital Region.

== Demographics ==
As of 2011 census, the mandal had a population of 45,778. The total population constitute, 22,599 males and 23,179 females —a sex ratio of 1026 females per 1000 males. 3,842 children are in the age group of 0–6 years, of which 1,924 are boys and 1,918 are girls. The average literacy rate stands at 67.68% with 28,384 literates.

== Government and politics ==
The mandal is under the administration of a tahsildar and the present tahsildar is I.Edward. Tsundur mandal is one of the 5 mandals under Vemuru (SC) (Assembly constituency), which in turn represents Bapatla (SC) (Lok Sabha constituency) of Andhra Pradesh.

== Towns and villages ==
As of 2011 census, the mandal has 17 villages and no towns.

The settlements in the mandal are listed below:

1. Alapadu
2. Chinaparimi
3. Edlapalle
4. Kothapalle Narikellapalle
5. Manduru
6. Modukuru
7. Pedagadelavarru
8. Penugudurupadu
9. Thottempudi
10. Tsunduru†
11. Valiveru
12. Vetapalem
- †–Mandal headquarters

== Education ==
The mandal plays a major role in education for the rural students of the nearby villages. The primary and secondary school education is imparted by government, aided and private schools, under the School Education Department of the state. As per the school information report for the academic year 2015–16, the mandal has more than 4,314 students enrolled in over 47 schools.

== See also ==
- List of mandals in Andhra Pradesh
- Villages in Tsundur mandal
