= Modukuru =

- Village
- Interactive map of Modukuru
- Location in Andhra Pradesh, India
- Coordinates: 16.1314°N 80.5825°E
- Country: India
- State: Andhra Pradesh
- District: Bapatla
- Elevation: 11 m (36 ft)

Languages
  - Official: Telugu
- Time zone: UTC+5:30 (IST)
- PIN: 522318
- Telephone code: 08644
- Lok Sabha constituency: Bapatla
- Vidhan Sabha constituency: Vemuru

Modukuru is a village in Bapatla district of the Indian state of Andhra Pradesh. It is located in Tsundur mandal of Tenali revenue division.

Modukuru was identified as Panchayath on 17 November 1931. It comes under Vemuru assembly constituency and Bapatla parliament constituency. The village is located in Tsunduru mandal and Tenali taluka. The pin Code is 522318. There are 14 Wards in the village with a population of over 10,000.

== Geography ==
Modukuru has an average elevation of 11 metres (36 ft) above sea level. Modukuru is 25 km from Guntur City, 18 km from Tenali, 12 km from Ponnur and 45 km from Vijayawada City.

== Agriculture ==
Modukuru occupies 4,185 acres (1,694 ha), with 3760 acres dedicated to agriculture. The main crops are rice, black gram, turmeric, banana, lemon, chili, sugarcane and pulses. It has agricultural, milk and water societies.

== Infrastructure ==
- Street Tube Lights:310
- Mercury Street Lights:9
- No of Streets IN VILLAGE:74
- Total street lengths:7.25 km
