= Vadlamudi =

- Village
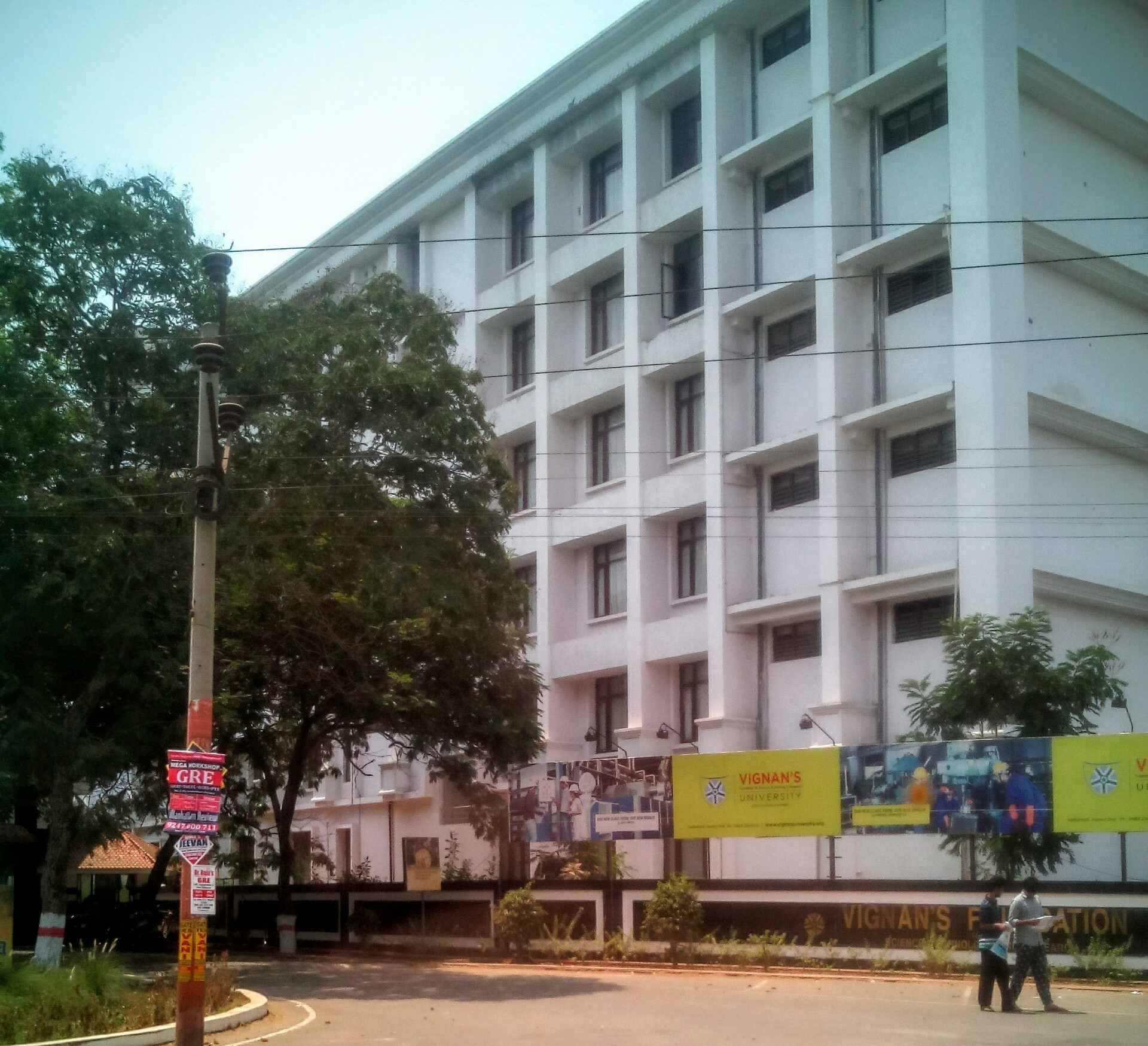
- Vignan University building, Vadlamudi
- Interactive map of Vadlamudi
- Location in Andhra Pradesh, India
- Coordinates: 16°13′29″N 80°33′34″E
- Country: India
- State: Andhra Pradesh
- District: Guntur
- Mandal: Chebrolu

Government
  - Type: Panchayati raj
  - Body: Vadlamudi gram panchayat

Area
  - Total: 1,518 ha (3,750 acres)

Population (2011)
  - Total: 9,346
  - Density: 615.7/km^{2} (1,595/sq mi)

Languages
  - Official: Telugu
- Time zone: UTC+5:30 (IST)
- PIN: 522212
- Area code: +91–8644
- Vehicle registration: AP

Vadlamudi is a village in the Guntur district of the Indian state of Andhra Pradesh. It is the headquarters of Chebrolu mandal in Tenali revenue division. It is located in Chebrolu mandal of Tenali revenue division.

== Geography ==
Vadlamudi is situated to the northeast of the mandal headquarters, Chebrolu, at 16.2356°N 80.5605°E. It is spread over an area of 1,518 ha (3,750 acres).

== Governance ==
Vadlamudi gram panchayat is the local self-government of the village. It is divided into wards and each ward is represented by a ward member. The village forms a part of Andhra Pradesh Capital Region and is under the jurisdiction of APCRDA.

== Economy ==
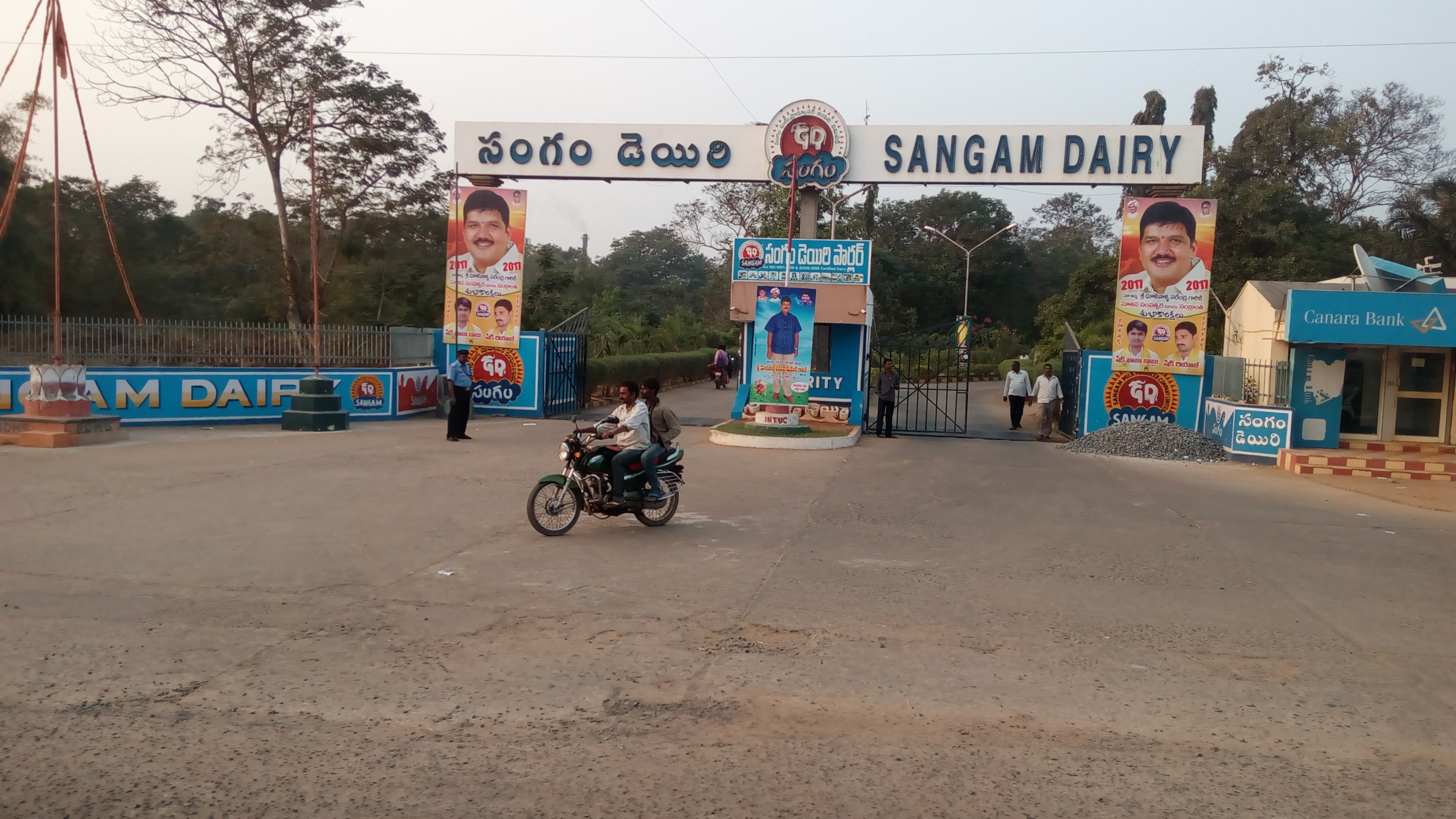
Sangam Dairy at Vadlamudi

Sangam Dairy is the cooperative dairy for processing milk, which was formed by the Guntur district milk producers union.

== Transport ==
Tenali–Narakodur road passes through Vadlamudi. Rural roads connects the village with Chebrole, Penugudurupadu and Sreerangapuram. On this route, APSRTC operates buses from Guntur and Tenali bus stations.

== Education ==
As per the school information report for the academic year 2018–19, the village has a total of 7 schools. These schools include 3 Mandal Parishad and 4 private schools.

== See also ==
- List of villages in Guntur district
