= Athota =

- Village
- Interactive map of Athota
- Location in Andhra Pradesh, India
- Coordinates: 16.2910°N 80.6816°E
- Country: India
- State: Andhra Pradesh
- District: Guntur
- Mandal: Kollipara

Government
  - Type: Panchayati raj
  - Body: Athota gram panchayat

Area
  - Total: 711 ha (1,760 acres)

Population (2011)
  - Total: 5,628
  - Density: 792/km^{2} (2,050/sq mi)

Languages
  - Official: Telugu
- Time zone: UTC+5:30 (IST)
- Area code: +91–
- Vehicle registration: AP

Athota is a village in Guntur district of the Indian state of Andhra Pradesh. It is located in Kollipara mandal of Tenali revenue division.

== Geography ==
Panchayathi Office Athota

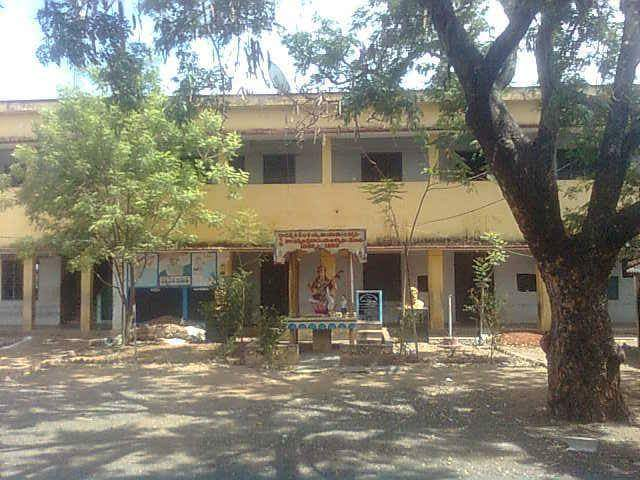
Z.P.High School Athota

Religion in Athota (Census 2011)
Hinduism	86.00%
Schedule Caste	9.12%
Schedule Tribe	3.64%
Others	0.18%

Athota is situated to the west of the mandal headquarters, Kollipara, at 16.2910°N 80.6816°E. It is spread over an area of 711 ha (1,760 acres). The village is at a distance of 11 kilometres (6.8 mi) northeast Tenali, 28 kilometres (17 mi) east of the district headquarters, Guntur and 34 kilometres (21 mi) south of Vijayawada.

== Demographics ==
As of 2011 census of India, there were 1,723 households with a population of 5,628. It comprises 2,793 males, 2,835 females and 511 children (age group of 0–6 years). The children include 257 boys and 254 girls. The average literacy rate stands at 64.96% with 3,656 literates, of these males are 828 (32.65%) and females literates are 1144 (44.32%). There are a total of 2,803 workers and 2,825 non–workers.

== Governance ==
Athota gram panchayat is the local self-government of the village. The currently ruling sarpanch in this village is Sri Desaboina Naga Punneswara Rao. It is divided into wards and each ward is represented by a ward member. The village forms a part of Andhra Pradesh Capital Region and is under the jurisdiction of APCRDA. It belongs to Tenali (Assembly constituency) for Andhra Pradesh Legislative Assembly, which in turn is a part of Guntur (Lok Sabha constituency).

== Education ==
As per the school information report for the academic year 2018–19, the village has 6 schools. These include one private and one ZPHS and four Mandal Parishad schools.

== See also ==
- List of villages in Guntur district
