= Munnangi =

- Village
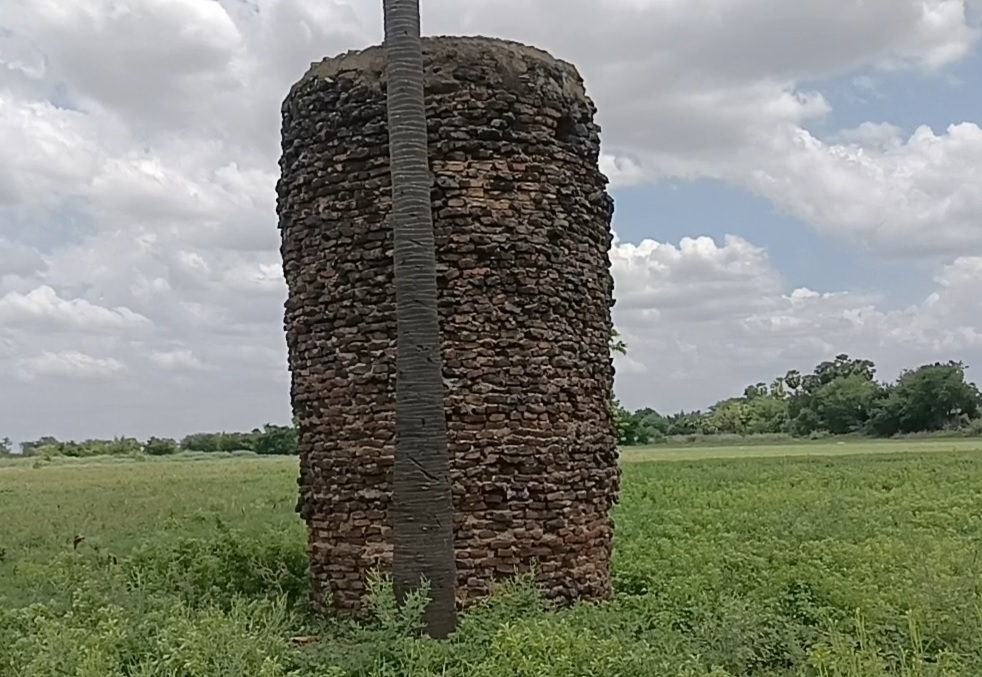
- A well in Munnangi
- Interactive map of Munnangi
- Location in Andhra Pradesh, India
- Coordinates: 16°19′43″N 80°43′17″E
- Country: India
- State: Andhra Pradesh
- District: Guntur
- Mandal: Kollipara

Government
  - Type: Panchayati raj
  - Body: Munnangi gram panchayat

Area
  - Total: 1,350 ha (3,300 acres)

Population (2011)
  - Total: 6,399
  - Density: 474/km^{2} (1,230/sq mi)

Languages
  - Official: Telugu
- Time zone: UTC+5:30 (IST)
- Area code: +91–
- Vehicle registration: AP

Munnangi is a village in Guntur district of the Indian state of Andhra Pradesh. It is located in Kollipara mandal of Tenali revenue division. Munnangi also known as Munikotipuram.

== Geography ==
Munnangi is situated to the northwest of the mandal headquarters, Kollipara, at 16°19′43″N 80°43′17″E. It is spread over an area of 1,350 ha (3,300 acres).

== Governance ==
Munnangi gram panchayat is the local self-government of the village. It is divided into wards and each ward is represented by a ward member. The currently ruling sarpanch in this village is V Deenamma. The village forms a part of Andhra Pradesh Capital Region and is under the jurisdiction of APCRDA.

== Education ==
As per the school information report for the academic year 2018–19, the village has 5 schools. These include 1 private and 4 Zilla/Mandal Parishad schools 1. Elementary School 2. Zilla Parishat High School 3. Vivekananda Vidyamandir .

== See also ==
- List of villages in Guntur district
- www.munnangi.com
