= Chakrayapalem =

- Village
- Interactive map of Chakrayapalem
- Location in Andhra Pradesh, India Chakrayapalem (India)
- Coordinates: 16.24°N 80.71°E
- Country: India
- State: Andhra Pradesh
- District: Guntur
- Established: None
- Founder: None
- Named for: Farming

Government
  - Type: YSRCP

Area
  - Total: 0.35 km^{2} (0.14 sq mi)

Population
  - Total: 5,000
  - Density: 11,431/km^{2} (29,610/sq mi)

Languages
  - Official: Telugu
- Time zone: UTC+5:30 (IST)
- Postal code: 522301
- Vehicle registration: AP

Chakrayapalem is a village in Guntur district of the Indian state of Andhra Pradesh. It is situated in Kollipara mandal of Tenali revenue division. The village contains approximately 3000 population and is very near to Tenali (7 km). The main occupation of the people is farming.

== Politics ==
The sarpanch is elected indirectly by ward members; the seat is presently held by Ch Baburao.

== Financial services ==
The Chakrayapalem branch of Corporation Bank is located at D NO:2 122 Chakrayapalem, Kollipara Mandal, Guntur District.
