= Vejendla =

- Village
- Vejendla railway station signboard
- Interactive map of Vejendla
- Location in Andhra Pradesh, India
- Coordinates: 16.239°N 80.526°E
- Country: India
- State: Andhra Pradesh
- District: Guntur
- Mandal: Chebrolu

Government
  - Type: Panchayati raj
  - Body: Vejendla gram panchayat

Area
  - Total: 1,399 ha (3,460 acres)

Population (2011)
  - Total: 9,938
  - Density: 710.4/km^{2} (1,840/sq mi)

Languages
  - Official: Telugu
- Time zone: UTC+5:30 (IST)
- PIN: 522212
- Area code: +91–8644
- Vehicle registration: AP

Vejendla is a village in Guntur district of the Indian state of Andhra Pradesh. It is supposed to be the headquarters of Chebrolu mandal in Tenali revenue division. It is located in Chebrolu mandal of Tenali revenue division.

== Geography ==
Vejendla is situated to the north of the mandal headquarters, Chebrolu, at 16.239°N 80.526°E. It is spread over an area of 1,399 ha (3,460 acres).

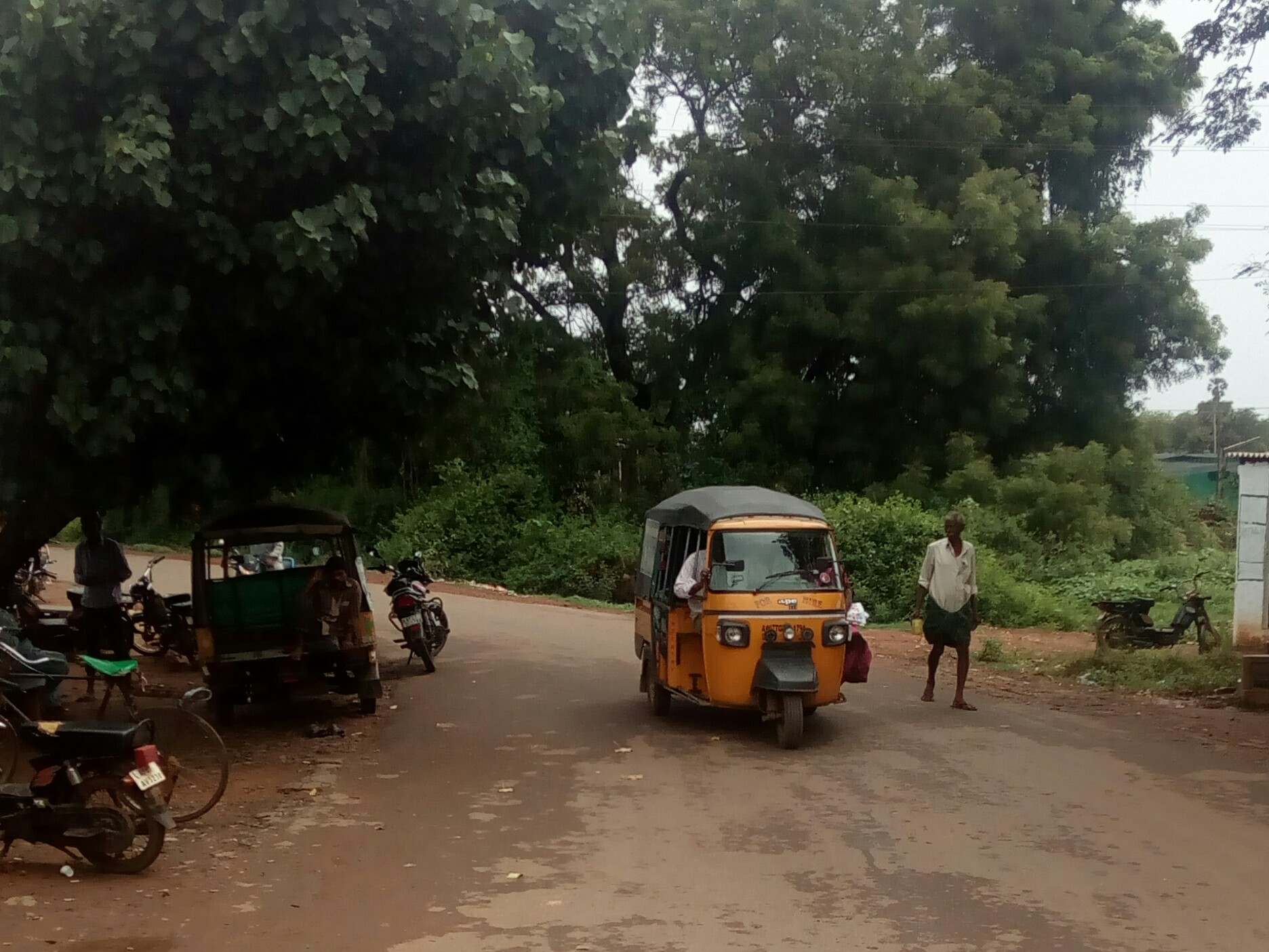
Vejendla road

== Governance ==
Vejendla gram panchayat is the local self-government of the village. It is divided into wards and each ward is represented by a ward member. The village forms a part of Andhra Pradesh Capital Region and is under the jurisdiction of APCRDA.

== Transport ==
Tenali–Narakodur road bypasses Vejendla. Rural roads connects the village with Chebrole, Guntur bypass and Suddapalli. On this route, APSRTC operates buses from Guntur and Tenali bus stations. Vejendla railway station provides rail connectivity and is situated on Guntur–Tenali section of Guntur railway division.

== Education ==
As per the school information report for the academic year 2018–19, the village has a total of 10 schools. These schools include 6 Zilla/Mandal Parishad and 4 private schools.

== See also ==
- List of villages in Guntur district
