= Edlapalli =

- Village
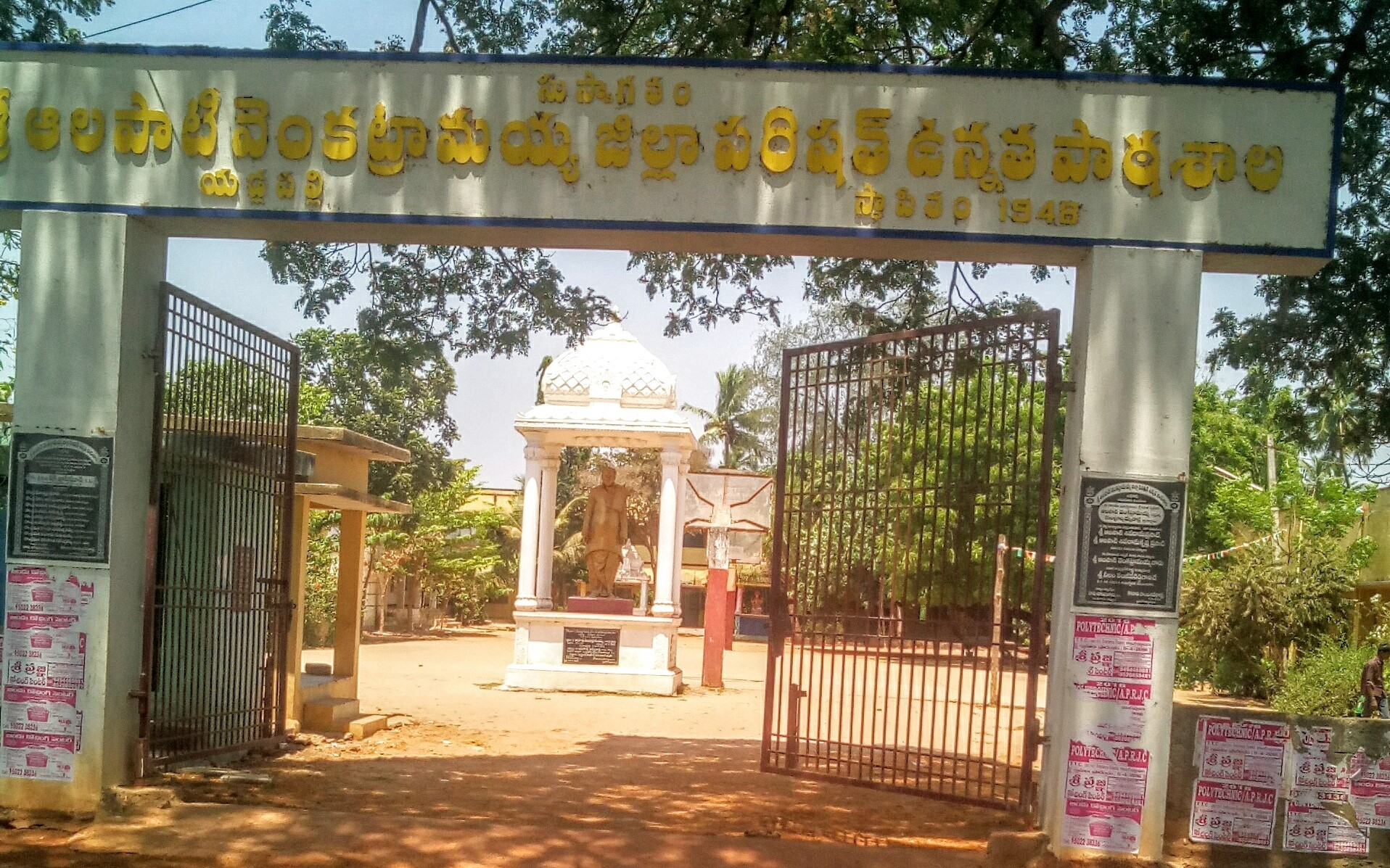
- Alapati Venkataramaiah Zilla Parishad High School, Edlapalli
- Interactive map of Edlapalli
- Location in Andhra Pradesh, India Edlapalli (India)
- Coordinates: 16.2117°N 80.5972°E
- Country: India
- State: Andhra Pradesh
- District: Bapatla

Area
  - Total: 15.80 km^{2} (6.10 sq mi)

Population (2011) PIN Code = 522 211)
  - Total: 8,300
  - Density: 530/km^{2} (1,400/sq mi)

Languages
  - Official: Telugu
- Time zone: UTC+5:30 (IST)
- Postal code: 522 211

Edlapalli is a village in Bapatla district of the Indian state of Andhra Pradesh. It is located in Tsundur mandal of Repalle revenue division.

== Demographics ==
As of 2011 census, Edlapalli had a population of 8,300 with 2,431 households. The total population constitute, 4,066 males and 4,234 females —a sex ratio of 1041 females per 1000 males. 846 children are in the age group of 0–6 years, of which 424 are boys and 422 are girls. The average literacy rate stands at 66.43% with 4,952 literates, lower than the state average of 67.41%.

== Government and politics ==
Edlapalli gram panchayat is the local self-government of the village. It was formed on 12 April 1930 and got upgraded to Grade–II on 4 April 1954 and finally to Grade–I on 1 May 1964. The gram panchayat got separated from Edlapalli gram panchayat dundipalem on 18 November 1978.

The elected members of the gram panchayat is headed by a sarpanch.

== Economy ==
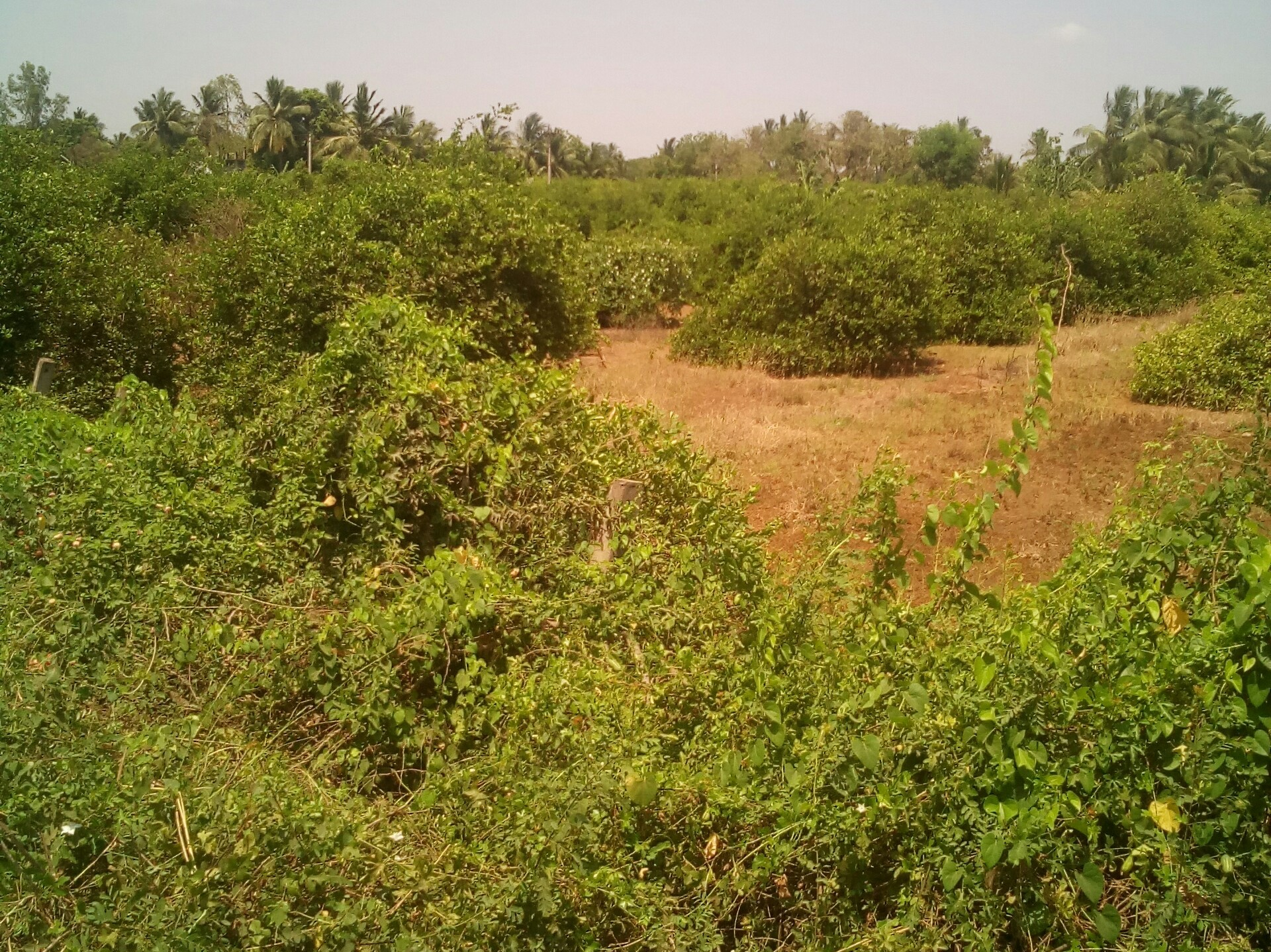
Lemon orchards at Edlapalli

Agriculture is the main occupation of the villagers. Banana, lemon and paddy are the major crops cultivated.

== See also ==
- Villages in Mangalagiri mandal
