= Narakodur =

Narakoduru
- Village
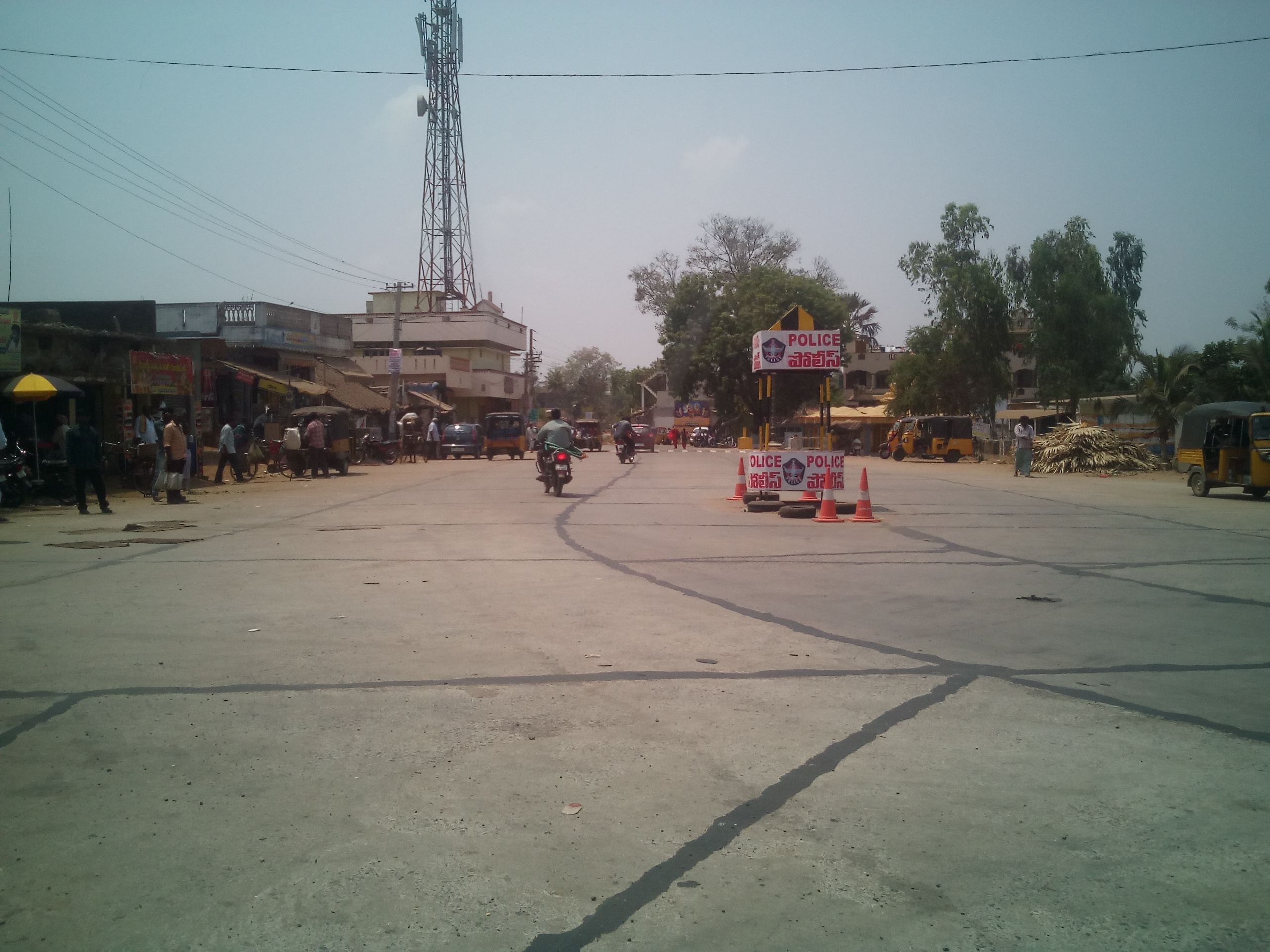
- Narakoduru road junction
- Interactive map of Narakoduru
- Location in Andhra Pradesh, India
- Coordinates: 16.226258°N 80.514671°E
- Country: India
- State: Andhra Pradesh
- District: Guntur
- Mandal: Chebrolu

Government
  - Type: Panchayati raj
  - Body: Narakoduru gram panchayat

Area
  - Total: 1,209 ha (2,990 acres)

Population (2011)
  - Total: 6,564
  - Density: 542.9/km^{2} (1,406/sq mi)

Languages
  - Official: Telugu
- Time zone: UTC+5:30 (IST)
- PIN: 522212
- Area code: +91–8644
- Vehicle registration: AP

Narakoduru is a village in Guntur district of the Indian state of Andhra Pradesh. It is the headquarters of Bollapalle mandal in Tenali revenue division. It is located in Chebrolu mandal of Tenali revenue division.

== Geography ==
Narakodur is situated to the northwest of the mandal headquarters, Chebrolu, at 16.226258°N 80.514671°E. It is spread over an area of 1,209 ha (2,990 acres).

== Demographics ==
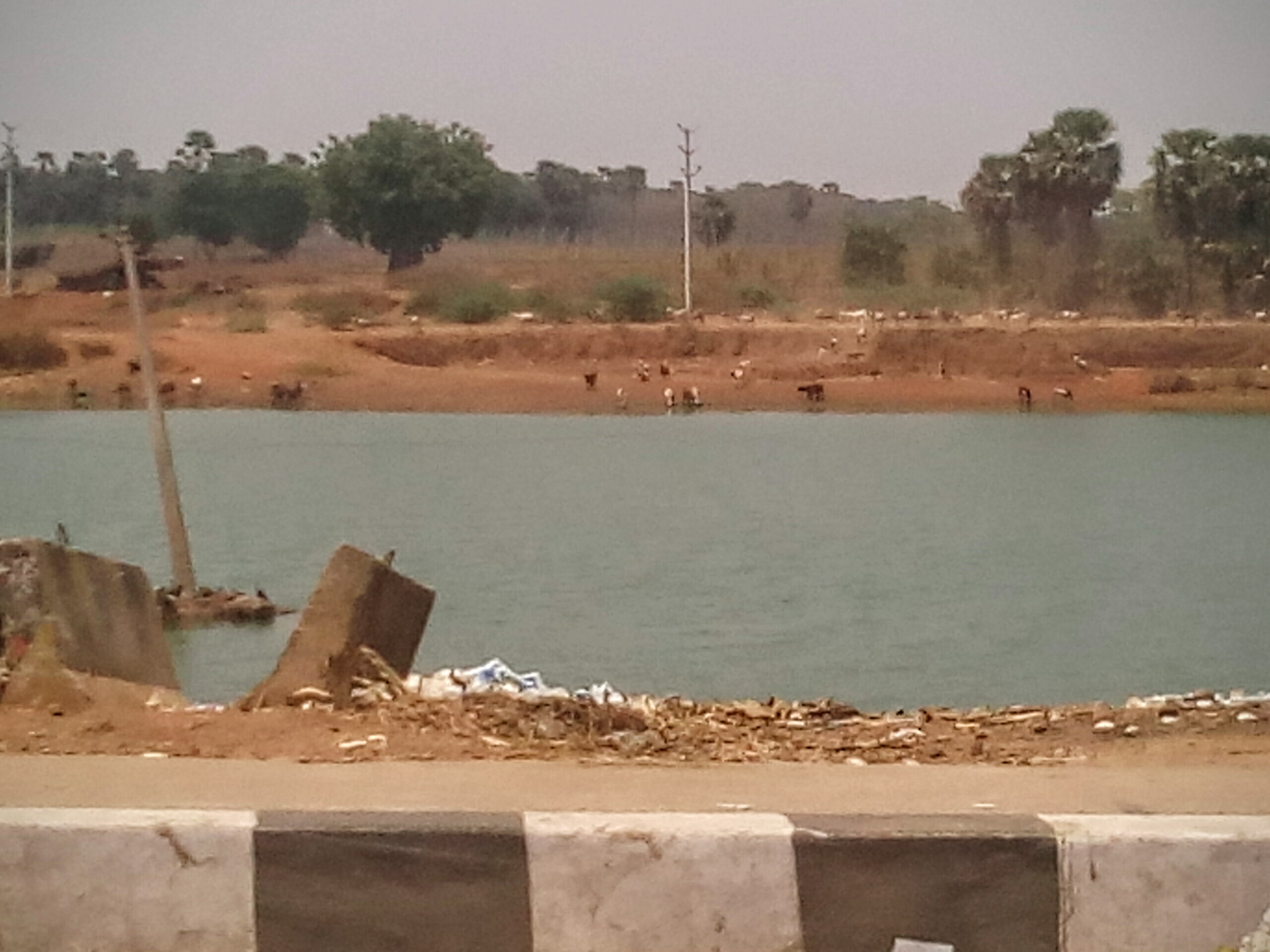
A water pond known as Pedda Cheruvu in Narakoduru

As of 2011 Census of India, Narakodur had a population of 6,564 with 1800 households. The total population constitutes 3,250 males and 3,314 females —a sex ratio of 1020 females per 1000 males. 575 children are in the age group of 0–6 years, of which 307 are boys and 268 are girls —a ratio of 873 per 1000. The average literacy rate stands at 72.32% with 4,331 literates, significantly higher than the state average of 67.41%.

== Governance ==
Narakodur gram panchayat is the local self-government of the village. It is divided into wards and each ward is represented by a ward member. The village forms a part of Andhra Pradesh Capital Region and is under the jurisdiction of APCRDA.

== Transport ==
Local transport include, city bus services operated by APSRTC from NTR bus station to Chebrolu. The State Highway 48 passes through Narakodur, that connects Guntur and Chirala. Tenali–Narakodur road intersects Guntur–Chirala road at Narakodur junction. Rural roads connects the village with Ananthavarapadu, Gundavaram, Pathareddypalem and Vejendla.

== Education ==
As per the school information report for the academic year 2018–19, the village has a total of 5 schools. These schools include 1 private school and 4 Zilla/Mandal Parishad schools.

== See also ==
- List of villages in Guntur district
