= Dhulipalla Narendra Kumar =

Indian politician in Andhra Pradesh

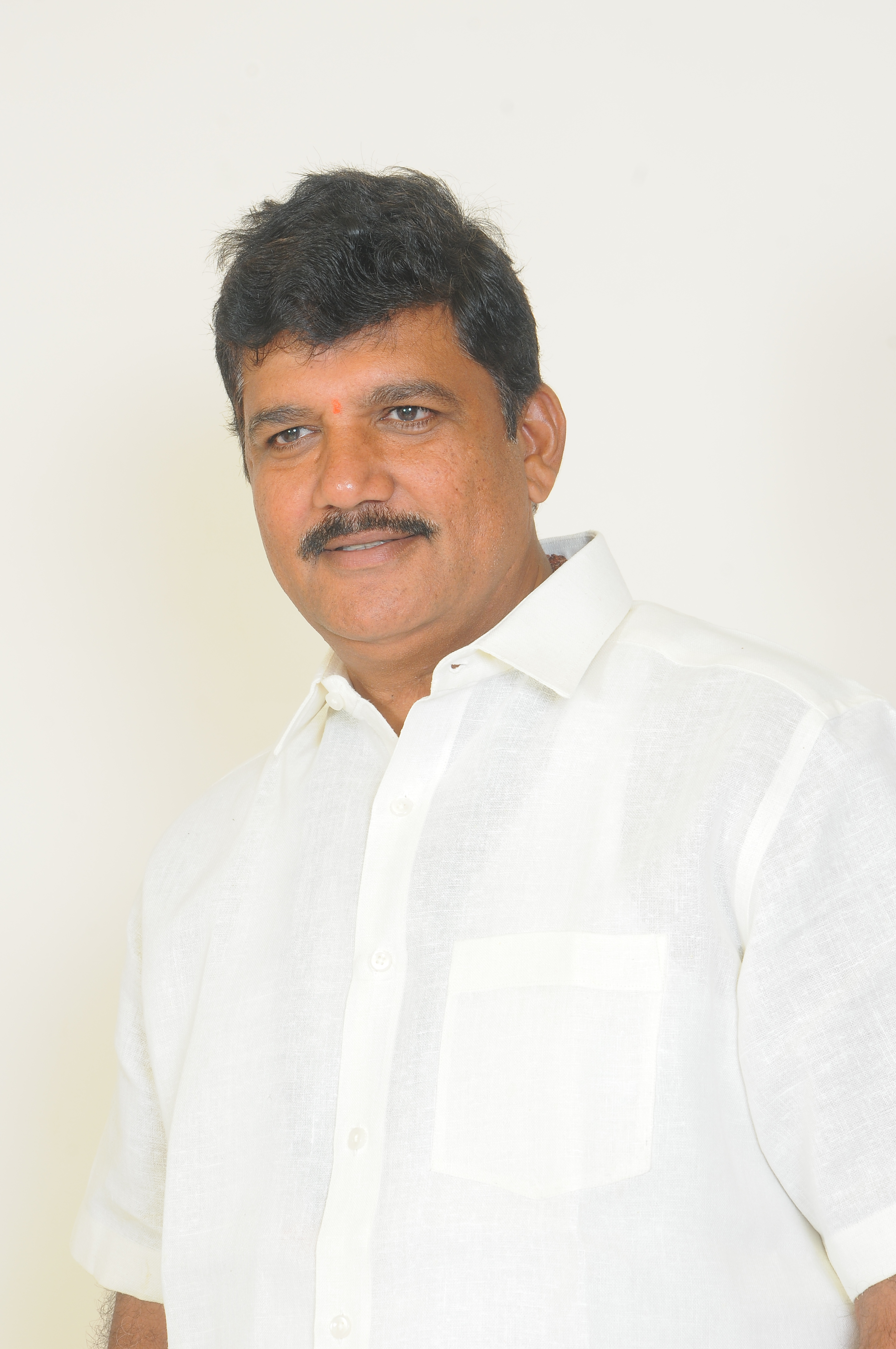

Member of the Andhra Pradesh Legislative Assembly
- Incumbent
- Assumed office 21 June 2024
- Preceded by: Kilari Venkata Rosaiah
- Constituency: Ponnur
- In office 12 December 1994 – 23 May 2019
- Preceded by: Chittineni Venkata Rao
- Succeeded by: Kilari Venkata Rosaiah
- Constituency: Ponnur

Personal details
- Born: 14 December 1967 (age 58): Chintalapudi, Andhra Pradesh, India
- Party: Telugu Desam Party
- Spouse: Jyothirmai
- Children: Veera Vyshnavi; Naga Sai Vydeepthi
- Parents: Dhulipalla Veeraiah Chowdary; Prameela Dhulipalla
- Education: University of Mysore (B.Tech.)

Dhulipalla Narendra Kumar (born 14 December 1967) is an Indian politician from Telugu Desam party and member of Andhra Pradesh Legislative Assembly representing Ponnur Assembly constituency from 1994 to 2019, and again in 2024. He is one of the few members of Andhra Pradesh Legislative Assembly who won five times continuously, and also one of the senior most leaders in the Telugu Desam Party serving as the coordinator for Eluru and Vijayawada parliament segments. He is also the chairman of Sangam Dairy located in Vadlamudi.

== Education ==
Dhulipalla Narendra Kumar completed his SSC from Ananthavarappadu village and continued his Intermediate Education from Loyola College, Vijayawada. He pursued his B.Tech in 1989 from University of Mysore.

== Career ==
Narendra Kumar is known for carrying development activities in Ponnur constituency after becoming Member of Legislative Assembly continued the legacy of his father.

=== First term (1994–1999) ===
He entered politics due to the sudden death of his father Dhulipalla Veeraiah Chowdary in 1994 in a road accident. He defeated his opponent T Venkata Ramaiah of Indian National Congress by a margin of 21,729 votes.

=== Second term (1999–2004) ===
Narendra Kumar won again on ticket of TDP by defeating his nearest rival Chittineni Prathap Babu of INC by margin of 15,000 votes. He also worked as the Telugu Desam Party, Guntur district party president from 2002 to 2004.

=== Third term (2004–2009) ===
He won for the third time though his Telugu Desam party suffered badly in huge Congress wave and was the only MLA elected from Guntur district in 2004 by a majority of 9,000 votes. He also worked as president for Telugu Raithu an affiliated farmers wing of Telugu Desam Party.

=== Fourth term (2009–2014) ===
Narendra Kumar won again on TDP ticket for a fourth consecutive term with a meagre difference of 2000 votes. He was elevated to position of opposition party Chief Whip in Andhra Pradesh Legislative Assembly. He also became the chairman of Sangam Dairy in 2010.

=== Fifth term (2014–2019) ===
He continued his winning storm in 2014 and became one of the few MLAs who won consecutively five times in Andhra Pradesh Legislative Assembly, with a majority of 7,761 votes. He focused on expansion of Sangam Dairy for the public.

In 2019, he lost to his opponent by only 1100 votes.

=== Sixth term (2024–present) ===
He won the Andhra Pradesh Legislative Assembly elections 2024 by a margin of 32,915 votes, defeating Ambati Murali Krishna.

== Election statistics ==
| | Year | Contested for | Party | Constituency | Opponent | Votes | Majority | Result |
|---|---|---|---|---|---|---|---|---|
| 1 | 1994 | MLA | Telugu Desam Party | Ponnur | T Venkata Ramaiah (INC) | 52087 - 30358 | 21729 | Won |
| 2 | 1999 | MLA | Telugu Desam Party | Ponnur | Chittineni Prathap Babu (INC) | 54865 - 39332 | 15533 | Won |
| 3 | 2004 | MLA | Telugu Desam Party | Ponnur | Mannava Raja Kishore (INC) | 51288 - 42243 | 9045 | Won |
| 4 | 2009 | MLA | Telugu Desam Party | Ponnur | Marupudi Leeladhara Rao (INC) | 61008 - 58840 | 2168 | Won |
| 5 | 2014 | MLA | Telugu Desam Party | Ponnur | Ravi Venkata Ramana (YSRCP) | 88386 - 80625 | 7761 | Won |
| 6 | 2019 | MLA | Telugu Desam Party | Ponnur | Kilari Venkata Rosaiah (YSRCP) | 87570 - 86458 | -1112 | Lost |
| 7 | 2024 | MLA | Telugu Desam Party | Ponnur | Ambati Murali Krishna (YSRCP) | 110410 - 77,495 | 32915 | Won |
