= Tottempudi =

Tottempudi is a Telugu Indian surname. Notable people with this surname include:

- Tottempudi Gopichand, known as Gopichand (born 1979), Telugu film actor
- Tottempudi Krishna, known as T. Krishna (1927–1987), Telugu editor and director
- Venu Thottempudi (born 1976), an Indian actor in Telugu films

== See also ==
- Thottempudi
