= Valiveru =

- Village
- A sign board of Valiveru village limit
- Interactive map of Valiveru
- Location in Andhra Pradesh, India
- Coordinates: 16.1208°N 80.3527°E
- Country: India
- State: Andhra Pradesh
- District: Bapatla

Area
  - Total: 11.32 km^{2} (4.37 sq mi)
- Elevation: 15.363 m (50.40 ft)

Population (2011)
  - Total: 5,034
  - Density: 444.7/km^{2} (1,152/sq mi)

Languages
  - Official: Telugu
- Time zone: UTC+5:30 (IST)
- PIN: 522211
- Telephone code: +91–8644
- Lok Sabha constituency: Bapatla (SC)
- Assembly constituency: Vemuru (SC)
- Website: www.valiveru.online

Valiveru is a village in Bapatla district of the Indian state of Andhra Pradesh. It is located in Tsundur mandal of Tenali revenue division.

== Geography ==
Valiveru is located at 16.1208°N 80.3527°E.

== Demographics ==
As of 2011 census, Valiveru had a population of 5,034. The total population constitute, 2,446 males and 2,588 females —a sex ratio of 1058 females per 1000 males. 388 children are in the age group of 0–6 years, of which 195 are boys and 193 are girls. The average literacy rate stands at 70.13% with 3,258 literates, higher than the district average of 67.4%.

== Government and politics ==
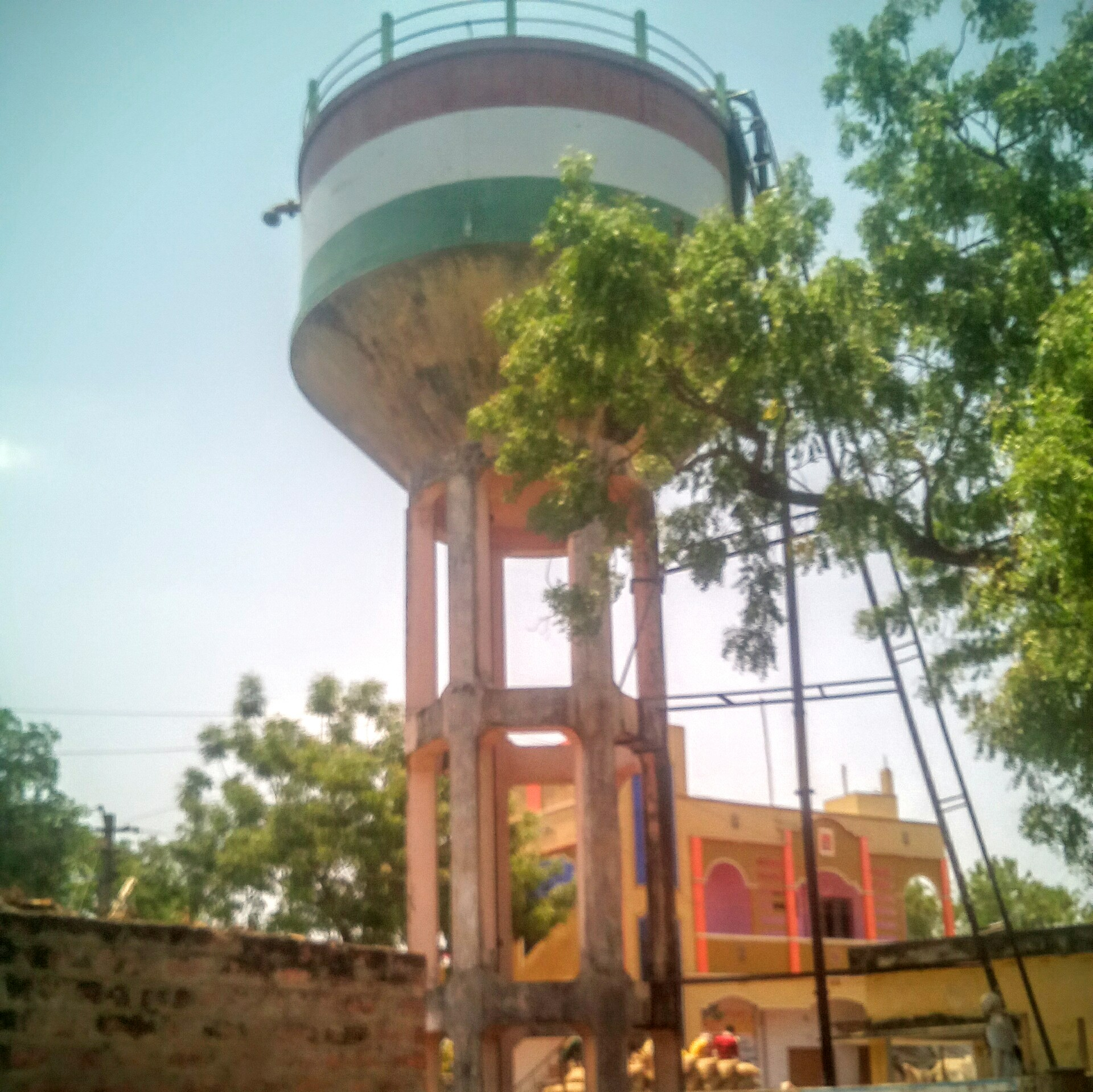
Water supply tank for Valiveru village

Valiveru gram panchayat is the local self-government of the village. The elected members of the gram panchayat is headed by a sarpanch.

Valiveru in Tsundur mandal is represented by Vemuru assembly constituency, which in turn represents Bapatla lok sabha constituency of Andhra Pradesh. Both the constituencies are reserved for scheduled castes. The present MLA representing the constituency is Merugu Nagarjuna of YSR Congress Party.

== Transport ==
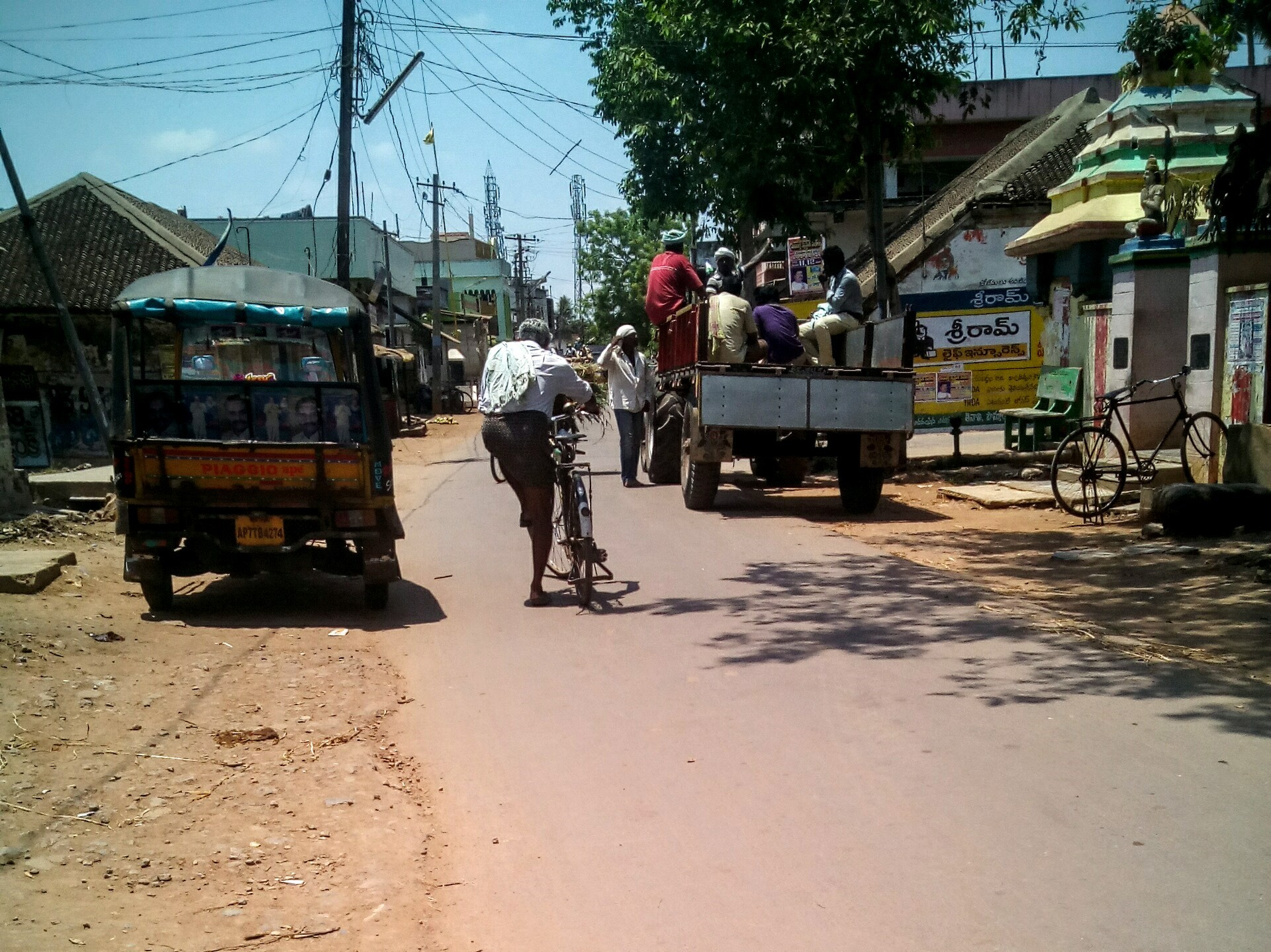
Valiveru main centre road

Valiveru railway station is situated on Howrah-Chennai main line, under the administration of Vijayawada railway division of South Central Railway zone. It is just an intermediate station, with no passenger operations. The Nearest railway station is Tenali Junction.Also there is a railway station proposal here in order to control the Rail traffic in Tenali.

== See also ==
- Villages in Tsundur mandal
