= Ponnur mandal =

- Mandal
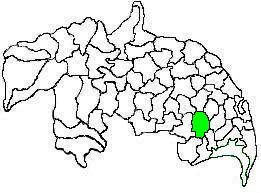
- Mandal map of Guntur district showing Ponnur mandal (in green)
- Interactive Map Outlining mandal
- Location in Andhra Pradesh, India
- Coordinates: 16.0667°N 80.5667°E
- Country: India
- State: Andhra Pradesh
- District: Guntur
- Revenue Division: Tenali
- Headquarters: Ponnur

Government
  - Body: Mandal Parishad
  - Tehsildar: R.V.Ramana Naik

Population (2011)
  - Total: 123,417

Languages
  - Official: Telugu
- Time zone: UTC+5:30 (IST)

Ponnur mandal is one of the 18 mandals in Guntur district of the Indian state of Andhra Pradesh.Dhulipalla Narendra Kumar – Telugu Desam Party is the present MLA of the constituency, having won the 2024 assembly elections. It is under the administration of Tenali revenue division and the headquarters are located at Ponnur town. The mandal is bounded by Vatticherukuru, Chebrole, Tsundur, Kakumanu, Amruthalur, Pittalavanipalem, Karlapalem and Bapatla mandals.

== Demographics ==
As of 2011 census, the mandal had a population of 123,417. The total population constitute, 60,953 males and 62,464 females —a sex ratio of 1024 females per 1000 males. 11,134 children are in the age group of 0–6 years, of which 10,939 are boys and 10,394 are girls. The average literacy rate stands at 72.94% with 81,904 literates.

== Administration ==
The mandal is partially a part of the Andhra Pradesh Capital Region under the jurisdiction of APCRDA. The mandal is under the control of a tahsildar and the present tahsildar is Padmanabhudu. Ponnur mandal is one of the 3 mandals under Ponnur (Assembly constituency), which in turn represents Guntur (Lok Sabha constituency) of Andhra Pradesh.

== Settlements ==
As of 2011 census, the mandal has 19 settlements. It includes 1 town and 18 villages.

The settlements in the mandal are listed below:

1. Aremanda
2. Brahmanakodur
3. Chintalapudi
4. Dandamudi
5. Doppalapudi
6. Jadavalli
7. Jupudi
8. Kondamudi
9. Mamillapalli
10. Mannava
11. Mulukuduru
12. Munipalli
13. Nandur
14. Patchalatadiparru
15. Ponnur (M)
16. Upparapalem
17. Vaddemukkala
18. Vallabharaopalem
19. Vellalur

Notes
(M) denotes a municipality

== Education ==
The mandal plays a major role in education for the rural students of the nearby villages. The primary and secondary school education is imparted by government, aided and private schools, under the School Education Department of the state. As per the school information report for the academic year 2015–16, the mandal has more than 15,055 students enrolled in over 118 schools.

== See also ==
- List of mandals in Andhra Pradesh
- Villages in Ponnur mandal
