= Selapadu =

Selapadu is a village in Andhra Pradesh, India. It is in Chebrolu revenue mandal.
