= Annvarapu lanka =

Annavarapu Lanka
- Village
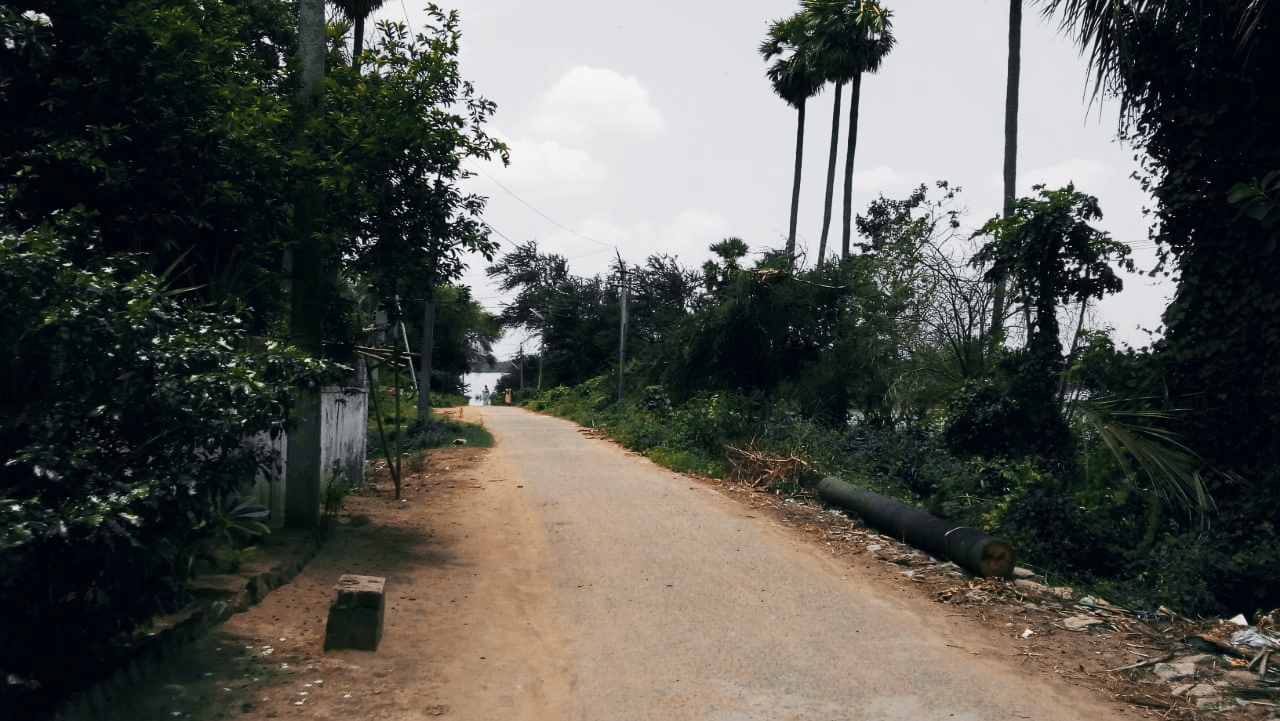
- Interactive map of Annavarapu Lanka
- Location within Andhra Pradesh
- Coordinates: 16.24872°N 80.80075°E
- Country: India
- State: Andhra Pradesh
- District: Guntur
- Mandal: Kollipara

Annavarapu Lanka is a village in Kollipara mandal of Guntur district in Andhra Pradesh, India. It is situated on the banks of Krishna River. This village falls under Tenali (Assembly constituency) and is 20 kilometers far from Tenali Town. The village itself lies inside Andhra Pradesh Capital Region.

== Agriculture ==
Farming is the livelihood for 95% of the population either directly or indirectly. The major crops grown includes Banana, Maize, Turmeric, Elephant foot yam, Black gram and Lemon. It is quite common for farmers to lose their crops during Krishna river floods.

== Landmarks ==
This village has a Zilla Parishad High School, a Rice Mill, 4 Churches and a temple of Rama.
