= Thottempudi =

- Village
- Interactive map of Thottempudi
- Location in Andhra Pradesh, India Thottempudi (India)
- Coordinates: 16.1369578°N 80.551484°E
- Country: India
- State: Andhra Pradesh
- District: Bapatla

Area
  - Total: 2.15 km^{2} (0.83 sq mi)

Population (2011)
  - Total: 1,777
  - Density: 827/km^{2} (2,140/sq mi)

Languages
  - Official: Telugu
- Time zone: UTC+5:30 (IST)

Thottempudi is a village in Bapatla district of the Indian state of Andhra Pradesh. It is located in Tsundur mandal of Tenali revenue division.

== Geography ==
Thottempudi is located at 16.1208°N 80.3527°E.

== See also ==
- Villages in Tsundur mandal
