= Dhulipalla Veeraiah Chowdary =

Indian politician in Andhra Pradesh

Minister of Revenue Government of Andhra Pradesh
- In office 9 March 1985 – 2 December 1989
- Governor: Shankar Dayal Sharma
- Chief Minister: N. T. Rama Rao

Member of Legislative Assembly Andhra Pradesh
- In office 1983–1989
- Preceded by: Gogineni Nageswara Rao
- Succeeded by: Chittineni Venkata Rao
- Constituency: Ponnur

Personal details
- Born: 19 February 1942 Chintalapudi, Guntur District
- Died: 24 January 1994 (aged 72) Narakodur
- Cause of death: Road Accident
- Political party: Telugu Desam Party
- Spouse: Prameela Dhulipalla
- Children: 3: Dhulipalla Narendra Kumar

Dhulipalla Veeraiah Chowdary was an Indian politician from the Telugu Desam party and a former member of Andhra Pradesh Legislative Assembly. He served as the Revenue Minister in the Government of Andhra Pradesh during N. T. Rama Rao tenure.

He served as an MLA from 1983 to 1989 representing the Ponnur Assembly constituency . He played a prominent role in growth and success of Sangam Milk Producer Company Limited (Sangam Dairy).

He worked diligently to improve the lives of rural milk producing farmers, particularly in the Guntur district of Andhra Pradesh. He was popularly known as Pala Veeraiah due to his association with milk producers. In recognizing his contribution to the dairy industry, he was appointed Chairman of the Andhra Pradesh Dairy Development Cooperative Federation (APDDCF), Hyderabad.
