= Chebrolu mandal =

- Mandal
- Interactive map of Chebrolu mandal
- Location in Andhra Pradesh, India
- Coordinates: 16°11′48″N 80°31′30″E
- Country: India
- State: Andhra Pradesh
- District: Guntur
- Revenue Division: Tenali
- Headquarters: Chebrolu

Government
  - Body: Mandal Parishad
  - Tehsildar: S.Jagan Mohan Rao

Area
  - Total: 134.18 km^{2} (51.81 sq mi)

Population (2011)
  - Total: 72,141
  - Density: 537.64/km^{2} (1,392.5/sq mi)

Languages
  - Official: Telugu
- Time zone: UTC+5:30 (IST)

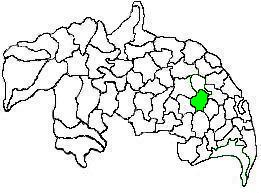
Mandal map of Guntur district showing Chebrolu mandal (in green)

Chebrolu mandal is one of the 18 mandals in Guntur district of the Indian state of Andhra Pradesh. It is under the administration of Tenali revenue division and the headquarters are located at Chebrolu. The mandal is bounded by Guntur, Pedakakani, Tenali, Vatticherukuru, Tsundur and Ponnur mandals.

== Administration ==
The mandal is also a part of the Andhra Pradesh Capital Region under the jurisdiction of APCRDA. The mandal is under the control of a tahsildar and the present tahsildar is S.Jagan Mohan Rao. Chebrolu mandal is one of the 3 mandals under Ponnur (Assembly constituency), which in turn represents Guntur (Lok Sabha constituency) of Andhra Pradesh.

== Towns and villages ==
As of 2011 census, the mandal has 19 settlements. It includes 1 town and 11 villages.

The settlements in the mandal are listed below:

1. Chebrolu
2. Godavarru
3. Manchala
4. Meesaragadda Ananthavaram
5. Narakodur
6. Pathareddipalem
7. Sekuru
8. Selapadu
9. Srirangapuram
10. Suddapalle
11. Vadlamudi
12. Vejendla
13. Kottha Reddipalem

== See also ==
- List of mandals in Andhra Pradesh
- Villages in Chebrolu mandal
