= Ponnur Assembly constituency =

Constituency of the Andhra Pradesh Legislative Assembly, India

Coordinates: 16.07°N 80.55°E

Ponnur
- Constituency No. 88 for the Andhra Pradesh Legislative Assembly
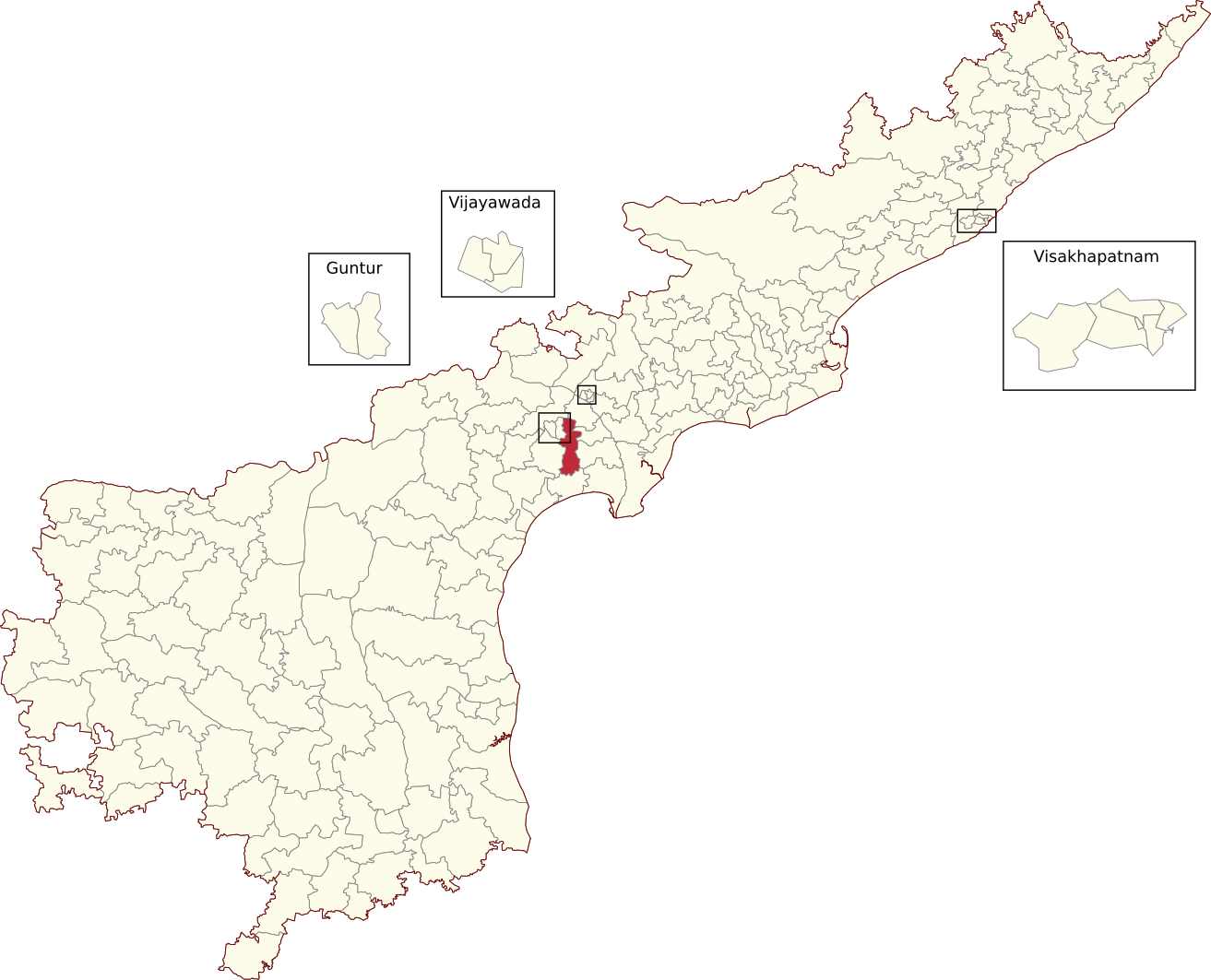
- Location of Ponnur Assembly constituency within Andhra Pradesh

Constituency details
- Country: India
- Region: South India
- State: Andhra Pradesh
- District: Guntur
- Lok Sabha constituency: Guntur
- Established: 1951
- Total electors: 2,25,815
- Reservation: None

Member of Legislative Assembly
- 16th Andhra Pradesh Legislative Assembly
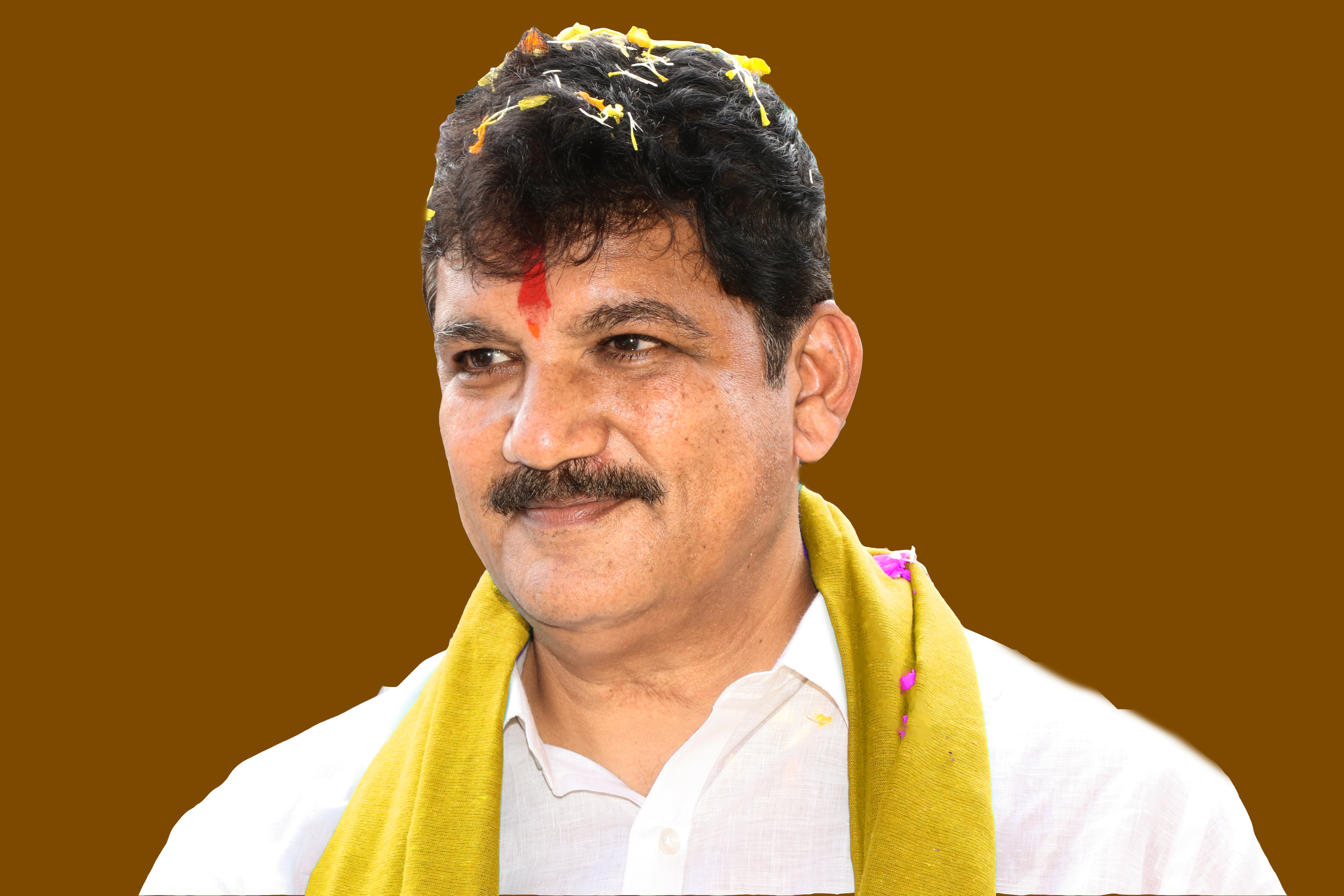
- Incumbent Dhulipalla Narendra Kumar
- Party: TDP
- Alliance: NDA
- Elected year: 2024

Ponnur Assembly constituency is a constituency in Guntur district of Andhra Pradesh that elects representatives to the Andhra Pradesh Legislative Assembly in India. It is one of the seven assembly segments of Guntur Lok Sabha constituency.

Dhulipalla Narendra Kumar of the Telugu Desam Party is the current MLA of the constituency, having won the 2024 Andhra Pradesh Legislative Assembly election. As of 2019, there are a total of 225,815 electors in the constituency. The constituency was established in 1951, as per the Delimitation Orders (1951).

== Mandals ==
Mandal
Ponnur
Chebrolu
Pedakakani

== Members of the Legislative Assembly ==
Year	Member	Political party
1952	Kolla Venkaiah	Communist Party of India
1955	Govada Paramdhamaiah	Krishikar Lok Party
1962	Nannapaneni Venkata Rao	Indian National Congress
1967	P.A.Prasadarao	Indian National Congress
1972	Doppapudi Ranga Rao	Independent
1978	Gogineni Nageswara Rao	Indian National Congress (I)
1983	Dhulipalla Veeraiah Chowdary	Telugu Desam Party
1985	Dhulipalla Veeraiah Chowdary	Telugu Desam Party
1989	Chittineni Venkata Rao	Indian National Congress
1994	Dhulipalla Narendra Kumar	Telugu Desam Party
1999	Dhulipalla Narendra Kumar	Telugu Desam Party
2004	Dhulipalla Narendra Kumar	Telugu Desam Party
2009	Dhulipalla Narendra Kumar	Telugu Desam Party
2014	Dhulipalla Narendra Kumar	Telugu Desam Party
2019	Kilari Venkata Rosaiah	YSR Congress Party
2024	Dhulipalla Narendra Kumar	Telugu Desam Party

== Election results ==
=== 2024 ===
2024 Andhra Pradesh Legislative Assembly election: Ponnur
Party	Candidate	Votes	%	±%
TDP	Dhulipalla Narendra Kumar	110,410	56.95	
YSRCP	Ambati Murali Krishna	77,495	39.97	
INC	Jakka Ravindranath	2,400	1.24	
NOTA	None of the above	1,248	0.64	
Majority		32,915	16.98	
Turnout		1,93,875		
Registered electors		2,27,648		
TDP gain from YSRCP		Swing		

=== 2019 ===
2019 Andhra Pradesh Legislative Assembly election: Ponnur
Party	Candidate	Votes	%	±%
YSRCP	Kilari Venkata Rosaiah	87,570	45.88	
TDP	Dhulipalla Narendra Kumar	86,458	45.30	
JSP	Boni Parvathi (Naidu)	12,033	6.30	
Majority		1,112	0.58	
Turnout		1,90,861	83.61	−1.06
Registered electors		2,28,234		
YSRCP gain from TDP		Swing		

Mandal Wise Voting
	YSRCP	TDP	JSP	Others	NOTA	Total
Pedakakani	25,787	24,417	3,406	942	265	54,817
Chebrolu	25,351	25,115	4,192	1,165	446	56,269
Ponnur	17,497	18,355	2,225	678	223	38,978
Ponnur Urban	17,947	17,925	2,117	764	249	39,002
Postal Votes	988	646	93	52	16	1,795
Total	87,570	86,458	12,033	3,601	1,199	190,861
Percentage	45.88%	45.30%	6.30%	1.89%	0.63%	100.00%

Source: CEO Andhra Pradesh

=== 2014 ===
2014 Andhra Pradesh Legislative Assembly election: Ponnur
Party	Candidate	Votes	%	±%
TDP	Dhulipalla Narendra Kumar	88,386	50.15	
YSRCP	Ravi Venkata Ramana	80,625	45.74	
Majority		7,761	4.41	
Turnout		176,251	84.67	+3.62
TDP hold		Swing		

=== 2009 ===
2009 Andhra Pradesh Legislative Assembly election: Ponnur
Party	Candidate	Votes	%	±%
TDP	Dhulipalla Narendra Kumar	61,008	38.51	−15.70
INC	Marupudi Leeladhara Rao	58,840	37.14	−7.51
PRP	Tella Venkateswara Rao	30,317	19.14	
Majority		2,168	1.37	
Turnout		158,425	81.05	+4.45
TDP hold		Swing		

=== 2004 ===
2004 Andhra Pradesh Legislative Assembly election: Ponnur
Party	Candidate	Votes	%	±%
TDP	Dhulipalla Narendra Kumar	51,288	54.21	−3.57
INC	Mannava Raja Kishore	42,243	44.65	−3.23
Majority		9,025	9.56	
Turnout		94,606	76.60	+10.82
TDP hold		Swing		

=== 1999 ===
1999 Andhra Pradesh Legislative Assembly election: Ponnur
Party	Candidate	Votes	%	±%
TDP	Dhulipalla Narendra Kumar	54,865	57.78%	
INC	Chittineni Prathap Babu	39,332	41.42%	
Margin of victory		15,533	16.36%	
Turnout		96,318	66.73%	
Registered electors		144,347		
TDP hold		Swing		

=== 1994 ===
1994 Andhra Pradesh Legislative Assembly election: Ponnur
Party	Candidate	Votes	%	±%
TDP	Dhulipalla Narendra Kumar	52,087	56.13%	
INC	Talasila Venkata Ramaiah	30,358	32.72%	
Margin of victory		21,729	23.42%	
Turnout		94,067	69.47%	
Registered electors		135,408		
TDP gain from INC		Swing		

=== 1989 ===
1989 Andhra Pradesh Legislative Assembly election: Ponnur
Party	Candidate	Votes	%	±%
INC	Chittineni Venkata Rao	46,831	48.37%	
TDP	Dhulipalla Veeraiah Chowdary	45,177	46.66%	
Margin of victory		1,654	1.71%	
Turnout		100,984	75.87%	
Registered electors		133,100		
INC gain from TDP		Swing		

=== 1985 ===
1985 Andhra Pradesh Legislative Assembly election: Ponnur
Party	Candidate	Votes	%	±%
TDP	Dhulipalla Veeraiah Chowdary	43,714	52.60%	
INC	Chittineni Venkata Rao	37,303	44.89%	
Margin of victory		6,411	7.71%	
Turnout		84,125	71.63%	
Registered electors		117,451		
TDP hold		Swing		

=== 1983 ===
1983 Andhra Pradesh Legislative Assembly election: Ponnur
Party	Candidate	Votes	%	±%
TDP	Dhulipalla Veeraiah Chowdary	49,478	65.76%	
INC	Nageswara Rao Gogineni	25,766	34.24%	
Margin of victory		23,712	31.51%	
Turnout		76,355	71.94%	
Registered electors		106,131		
TDP gain from INC(I)		Swing		

=== 1978 ===
1978 Andhra Pradesh Legislative Assembly election: Ponnur
Party	Candidate	Votes	%	±%
INC(I)	Nageswara Rao Gogineni	30,066	42.80%	
JP	Talasila Venkata Ramaiah	22,614	32.19%	
Margin of victory		7,452	10.61%	
Turnout		71,523	71.10%	
Registered electors		100,592		
INC(I) gain from Independent		Swing		

=== 1972 ===
1972 Andhra Pradesh Legislative Assembly election: Ponnur
Party	Candidate	Votes	%	±%
Independent	Doppapudi Ranga Rao	26,649	44.98%	
INC	Manu Anta Rao Yalavarti	26,307	44.40%	
Margin of victory		342	0.58%	
Turnout		60,271	69.97%	
Registered electors		85,135		
Independent gain from INC		Swing		

=== 1967 ===
1967 Andhra Pradesh Legislative Assembly election: Ponnur
Party	Candidate	Votes	%	±%
INC	A.P Pamulapati	32,996	58.15%	
CPI(M)	Kolla Venkaiah	20,821	45.70%	
Margin of victory		12,175	21.46%	
Turnout		58,221	80.61%	
Registered electors		72,230		
INC hold		Swing		

=== 1962 ===
1962 Andhra Pradesh Legislative Assembly election: Ponnur
Party	Candidate	Votes	%	±%
INC	Nannapaneni Venkata Rao	31,534	58.85%	
SWA	Pamulapati Butchi Naidu Chowdary	20,608	38.46%	
Margin of victory		10,926	20.39%	
Turnout		55,482	80.32%	
Registered electors		69,074		
INC hold		Swing		

=== 1955 ===
1955 Andhra Pradesh Legislative Assembly election: Ponnur
Party	Candidate	Votes	%	±%
KLP	Govada Paramdamiah	31,077	64.93%	
CPI	Jonnalagadda Joshi	16,788	35.07%	
Margin of victory		14,289	29.85%	
Turnout		47,865	71.71%	
Registered electors		66,746		
KLP hold		Swing		

=== 1952 ===
1952 Madras Legislative Assembly election: Ponnur
Party	Candidate	Votes	%	±%
CPI	Kolla Venkaiah	20,054	36.94%	
KLP	Coginam Lakshminarayana	11,240	20.71%	
KMPP	Ambati Tirupati Nayudu	9,059	16.69%	
INC	Raminoni Norayana	8,140	14.99%	14.99%
Independent	P. V. Krishnaiah Chowdary	3,396	6.26%	
Independent	Borugadda Ananda Rao	1,591	2.93%	
Independent	Bhodeti Jacob	805	1.48%	
Margin of victory		8,814	16.24%	
Turnout		54,285	74.15%	
Registered electors		73,206		
CPI win (new seat)				

== See also ==
- List of constituencies of the Andhra Pradesh Legislative Assembly
