= Kilari Venkata Rosaiah =

Indian politician

Member of Legislative Assembly Andhra Pradesh
- In office 12 June 2019 – 4 June 2024
- Preceded by: Dhulipalla Narendra Kumar
- Succeeded by: Dhulipalla Narendra Kumar
- Constituency: Ponnur

Personal details
- Born: 11 June 1967 (age 58) Guntur, Andhra Pradesh, India
- Party: Janasena Party
- Other political affiliations: Praja Rajyam Party (2009–2011); YSR Congress Party (2014–2024)
- Spouse: Kilari Lakshmi Saraswathi (m. 1989)

Kilari Venkata Rosaiah is an Indian politician from the state of Andhra Pradesh. He is the incumbent MLA from Ponnur Assembly constituency in Andhra Pradesh. He is the son-in-law of former Union Minister Ummareddy Venkateswarlu.

== Birth and education ==
He was born in 1967 to Kilari Koteswararao. He completed 10th class at Shrine Vailankani Senior Secondary School, Chennai in 1982. He completed intermediate at J. K. C College in 1984. He graduated with a Bachelor of Commerce degree from J. K. C. College, Acharya Nagarjuna University, Guntur in 1987.

== Political career ==
Rosaiah comes from a political background family. His father, Kilari Koteswararao worked as a Councillor and Chairman of Guntur Mirchi Market Yard. Kilari Koteswararao contested from Guntur-II Assembly constituency in 1989 from Telugu Desam Party and lost.

Rosaiah entered politics following his father's legacy. In 1985, Kilari Venkata Rosaiah was elected unanimously as vice-president of J. K. C. college. In 1993, he served as vice-president of the Guntur Mirchi Yard Association. He was elected as Guntur Mirchi Yard Association President in 1994. In 2009, he joined the Praja Rajyam Party (PRP) and appointed Guntur Town President from the Praja Rajyam Party. In 2009, he contested as MLA from Tenali but he lost.

Later, he joined YSRCP and worked as a YSRCP coordinator for Tenali. He was appointed YSRCP State Secretary in 2017.

In 2019 Andhra Pradesh Legislative Assembly election, he contested as YSRCP candidate from the Ponnur constituency and won as MLA against TDP candidate Dhulipalla Narendra Kumar by a minor difference of 1100 votes.

== Election statistics ==
	Year	Contested For	Party	Constituency	Opponent	Votes	Majority	Result
1	2009	MLA	Praja Rajyam Party	Tenali	Nadendla Manohar (INC)	61,582 – 37,990	-23,592	Lost
2	2019	MLA	YSR Congress Party	Ponnur	Dhulipalla Narendra Kumar (TDP)	87,570 – 86,458	1,112	Won
3	2024	MP	YSR Congress Party	Guntur	Chandra Sekhar Pemmasani (TDP)	8,64,948 – 5,20,253	-3,44,695	Lost
