= Chebrolu, Guntur district =

Chebrolu Tambrapuri, Chatturmukhapuram
- Village
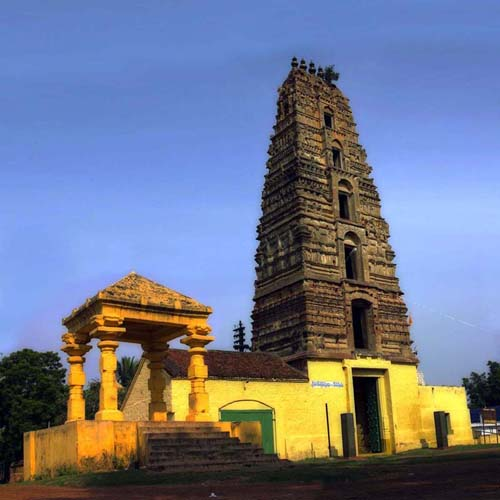
- Chebrolu Nageswaraswamy Temple Gopuram
- Interactive map of Chebrolu
- Location in Andhra Pradesh, India
- Coordinates: 16°11′48″N 80°31′30″E
- Country: India
- State: Andhra Pradesh
- District: Guntur
- Mandal: Chebrolu

Government
  - Type: Panchayati raj
  - Body: Chebrolu gram panchayat

Area
  - Total: 2,126 ha (5,250 acres)

Population (2011)
  - Total: 11,626
  - Density: 546.8/km^{2} (1,416/sq mi)

Languages
  - Official: Telugu
- Time zone: UTC+5:30 (IST)
- PIN: 522212
- Area code: +91–8644
- Vehicle registration: AP

Chebrolu is a village in Guntur district of the Indian state of Andhra Pradesh. It is the headquarters of Chebrolu mandal in Tenali revenue division. It was once a Buddhist site and territorial capital of Kakatiya dynasty. The Archaeological excavations revealed Buddhist artefacts of Satavahana and Ikshavaku period.

== Etymology ==
During the Satavahana dynasty, it was referred as Tambrapuri. Chattúrmukhapuram is the other name, which translates to the city facing the four points of the compass and was coined by Raja Vasireddy Venkatadri Naidu, a zamindar of Chintapalle.

== History ==
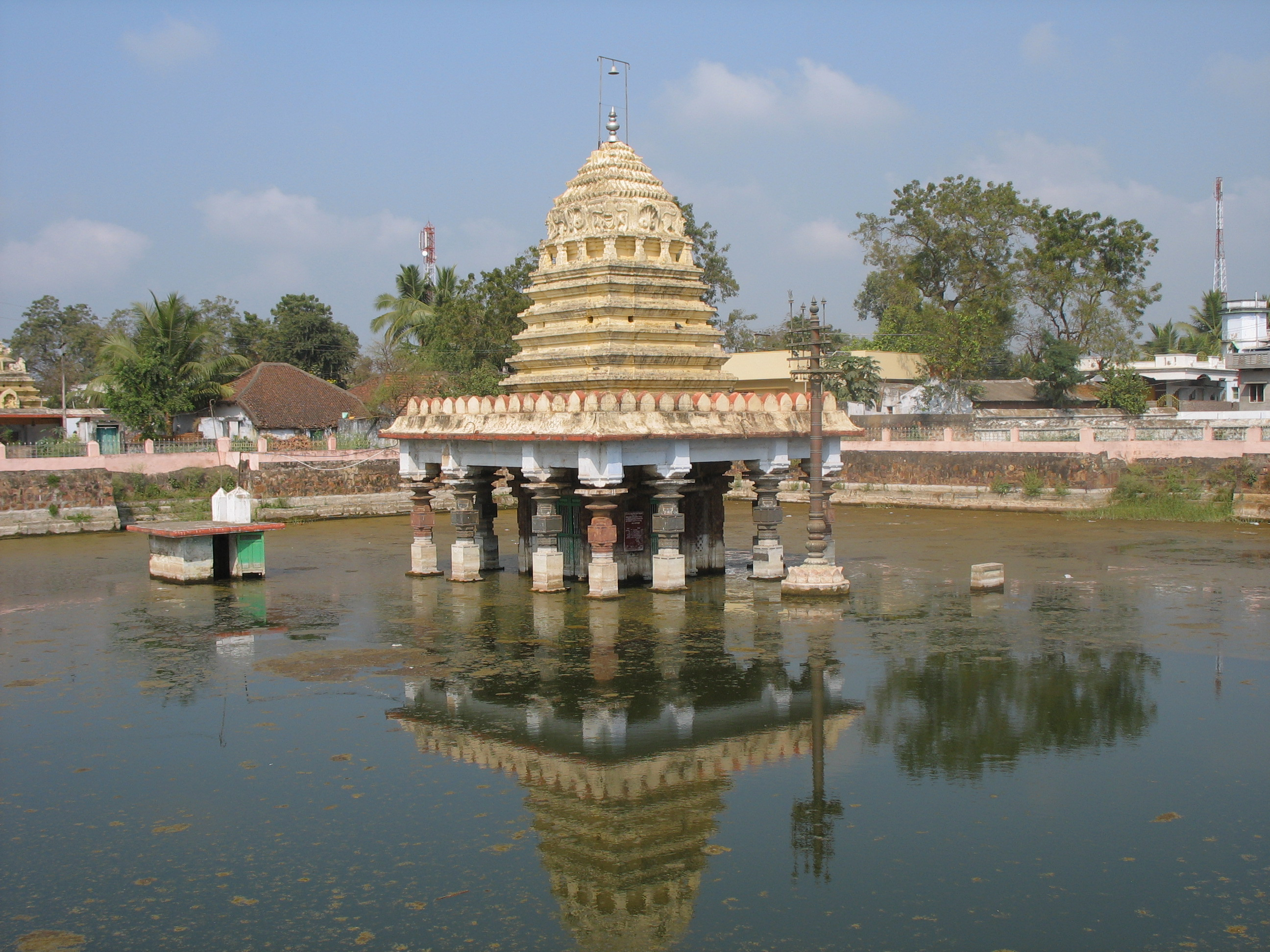
Chaturmukha Brahma Temple in Chebrole

Chebrolu has deep historical roots. It was once known as Sambhole, from which the modern name Chebrolu is derived. The village played a significant role as a regional fort for the Pallavas, Chalukyas, and Kakatiyas, with numerous temples and inscriptions reflecting its rich past. Many famous Chalukya inscriptions have been found in the temples here, and Chebrolu is mentioned in the Yuddamalluni Vijayawada inscriptions. During the Kakatiya period, Chebrolu gained prominence under the rule of the great general Jayapa, who also authored the well-known book on Indian dance, Nrutyaratnavali. In 2019, a Sanskrit language inscription dated to the reign of the Satavahana king Vijaya (c. 3rd century) was found during the restoration of the local Bheemeswara Temple. The inscription records the construction activities related to a Saptamatrika temple at Tambrape—an ancient name for Chebrolu. Several temples were built during the reign of Chalukya king Bhima (892–922 AD). It was also a place where several inscriptions of Cholas like the Velanadu Chodas were found. Satyashraya of the Eastern Chalukyas sent an army under his general Baya Nambi to seize areas held by the Chalukya Cholas. The general entered Vengi from the south, reduced the forts of Dharanikota and Yanamadala to ashes, and established himself at Chebrolu.

The Chaturmukha Brahmalingeswara Swamy temple, built by Raja Vasireddy Venkatadri Nayudu about 200 years ago, is one of the rare temples dedicated to Lord Brahma, who is worshipped alongside Lord Shiva. Vasireddy Venkatadri Nayudu also strengthened other temples and undertook the restoration of Chebrolu. The village was a known Buddhist site during the Satavahana and Ikshvaku periods, and several Buddhist artefacts have been unearthed. The presence of inscriptions suggests that Jain and Jewish communities also had a presence, with a Jain temple from the 11th century and a Jewish synagogue dedicated to the Children of Yacob. The famous Nageswara Swamy Temple and Galigopuram were built by the Devabhaktuni brothers Kanttanna and Murthanna. An inscription by Jayapa mentions a Jain temple of Ananta Jina, to which he made grants in 1213 AD.

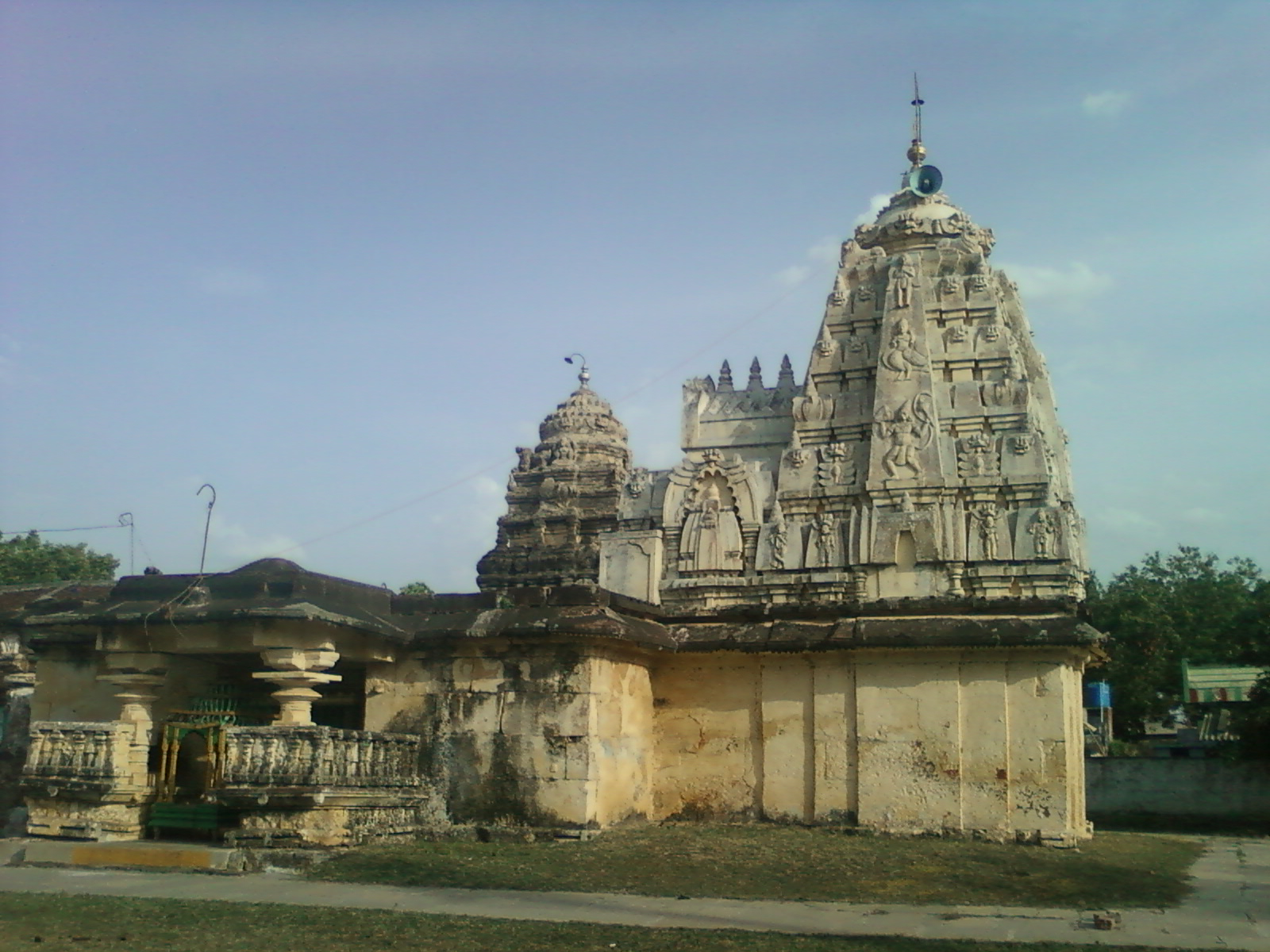
Adikesava swamy Temple in Chebrolu

=== Archaeological excavations ===
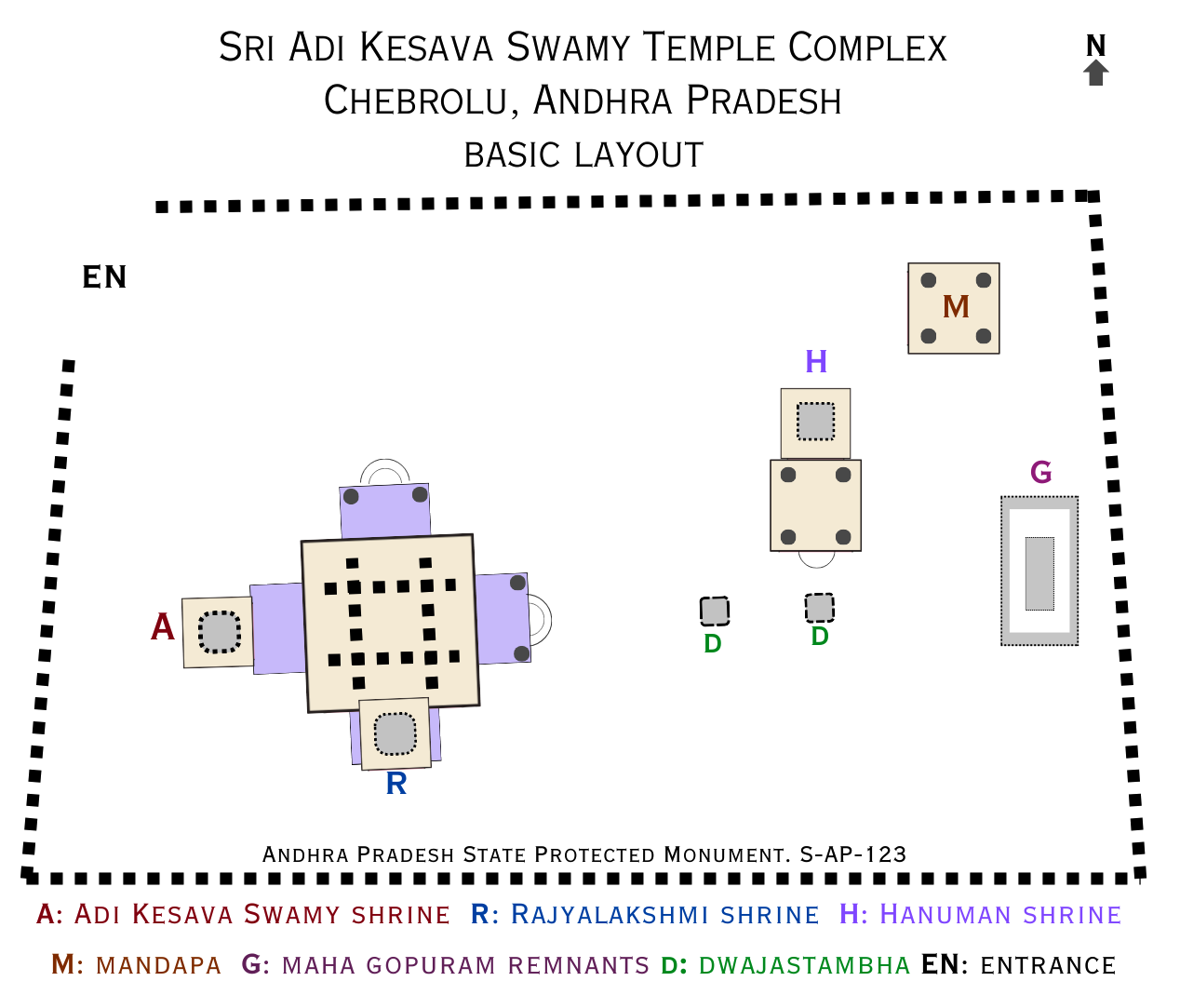
Basic layout of 12th century Adikesava Temple complex

A large horde of Satavahana coins were found in Chebrolu. The coins bore the ship figure with two masts. The inscription of Jayapa on two pillars in front of the Gopuram of Nageswara Temple (1231 AD) describes the relation between Hunas and Southern kings. It refers to the Madra King Pancola and the Videha King Hammira, the Huna and the King of Kasi waiting at his door.

== Geography ==
Chebrolu is situated at 15°58′N 80°30′E. It is spread over an area of 791 ha (1,950 acres).

== Demographics ==
As of 2011 census of India, Chebrolu had a population of 11,626 with 3,110 households. The total population constitute, 5,728 males and 5,898 females —a sex ratio of 1030 females per 1000 males. 1,231 children are in the age group of 0–6 years, of which 606 are boys and 625 are girls, —a ratio of 1031 per 1000. The average literacy rate stands at 69.91% with 7,267 literates.

== Governance ==
Chebrolu gram panchayat is the local self-government of the village. It is divided into wards and each ward is represented by a ward member. The village forms a part of Andhra Pradesh Capital Region and is under the jurisdiction of APCRDA.

== Culture ==
Culturally rich, Chebrolu has more than 100 temples of great historical importance. The village is home to the unique Chaturmukha Brahma temple, one of the few temples dedicated to Lord Brahma in India. The temple has a stunning red stone Nandi and is situated in the middle of a tank, surrounded by smaller temples dedicated to Shiva, Vishnu, and Shakti in her four incarnations. Chebrolu is a village teeming with life and festivity, with one or the other of its many temples celebrating religious occasions year-round. The village hosts several state-protected monuments, including the Nageswara Swamy temple, the Chaturmukha Brahma temple, and temples dedicated to Sri Veerabhadraswamy, Sri Prasannajaneya Swamy, Sri Bheemeswara Swamy, Sri Adikesava Swamy, and Sri Parvati Ammavaru. Most of these temples are still in active use, with the Nageswara Swamy and Bheemeswara Swamy temples generating annual revenue. However, the full potential of Chebrolu’s historical and cultural significance remains to be realized, as efforts continue to bring the village into the national tourism circuit.

== Transport ==
Local transport include, city buses operated by APSRTC from NTR bus station to the village. The State Highway 48 passes through Chebrolu, that connects Guntur, Tenali and Chirala. Rural roads connects the village with Lemallapadu, Vadlamudi, Vejendla and Vetapalem.

== Education ==
As per the school information report for the academic year 2018–19, the village has a total of 15 schools. These schools include one government school, 7 MPP and 7 private schools in which PRESIDENCY PUBLIC SCHOOL is biggest.

== See also ==
- List of villages in Guntur district
