= Mamillapalle =

- Village
- Interactive map of Mamillapalle
- Location in Andhra Pradesh, India
- Coordinates: 16°08′10″N 80°33′44″E
- Country: India
- State: Andhra Pradesh
- District: Guntur
- Mandal: Ponnur

Government
  - Type: Panchayati raj
  - Body: Mamillapalli gram panchayat

Area
  - Total: 563 ha (1,390 acres)

Population (2011)
  - Total: 4,197
  - Density: 745/km^{2} (1,930/sq mi)

Languages
  - Official: Telugu
- Time zone: UTC+5:30 (IST)
- PIN: 522xxx
- Area code: +91–
- Vehicle registration: AP

Mamillapalle is a village in the Guntur district of the Indian state of Andhra Pradesh. It is located in Ponnur mandal of Guntur revenue division.

== Government and politics ==
Mamillapalle gram panchayat is the local self-government of the village. It is divided into wards and each ward is represented by a ward member. The ward members are headed by a Sarpanch. The village forms a part of Andhra Pradesh Capital Region and is under the jurisdiction of APCRDA.

== Education ==
As per the school information report for the academic year 2018–19, the village has a total of 2 Mandal Parishad schools.

== See also ==
- List of villages in Guntur district
