= Kollipara =

- Village
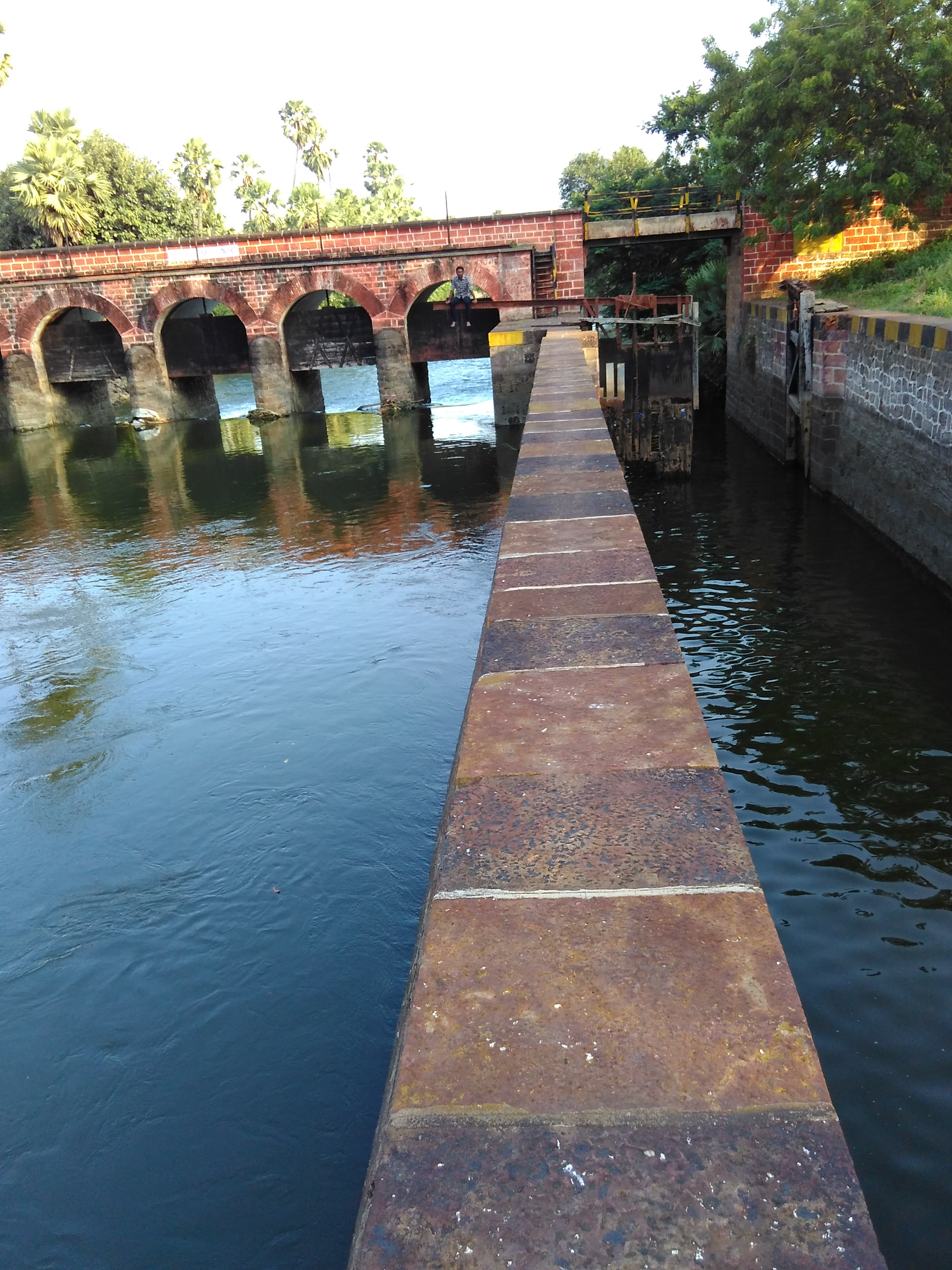
- Pidaparthi Palem lock
- Interactive map of Kollipara
- Location in Andhra Pradesh, India
- Coordinates: 16.287735°N 80.751927°E
- Country: India
- State: Andhra Pradesh
- District: Guntur
- Mandal: Kollipara

Government
  - Type: Panchayati raj
  - Body: Kollipara gram panchayat

Area
  - Total: 1,743 ha (4,310 acres)

Population (2011)
  - Total: 12,982
  - Density: 744.8/km^{2} (1,929/sq mi)

Languages
  - Official: Telugu
- Time zone: UTC+5:30 (IST)
- Area code: +91–
- Vehicle registration: AP

Kollipara is a village in Guntur district of the Indian state of Andhra Pradesh. It is the headquarters of Kollipara mandal in Tenali revenue division. And it was one of the capital for Pericchedi.

== Geography ==
Kollipara is situated at 16.2910°N 80.6816°E. It is spread over an area of 1,743 ha (4,310 acres). Kollipara is located at a distance of 21 km from Tenali. The Nearest city to Kollipara is Tenali.

== Governance ==
Kollipara gram panchayat is the local government of the village. It is divided into wards and each ward is represented by a ward member. The currently ruling sarpanch in this village is P Radhika. The village forms a part of Andhra Pradesh Capital Region and is under the jurisdiction of APCRDA.

== Economy and transportation ==
The major occupation of the village is agriculture, which includes cultivation of paddy.

APSRTC operates buses from Tenali, Guntur, Vijayawada and BHEL Township, Hyderabad to Kollipara. The nearest railway stations include Kolakaluru halt and Tenali Junction railway station.

== Education ==
As per the school information report for the academic year 2018–19, the village has 16 schools. These include 9 private and 7 Zilla/Mandal Parishad schools.

== See also ==
- List of villages in Guntur district
