= Kollipara mandal =

- Mandal
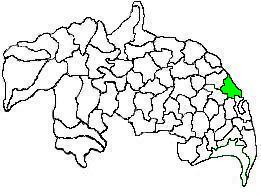
- Mandal map of Guntur district showing Kollipara mandal (in green)
- Interactive map of Kollipara mandal
- Location in Andhra Pradesh, India
- Coordinates: 16.2877°N 80.7519°E
- Country: India
- State: Andhra Pradesh
- District: Guntur
- Headquarters: Kollipara

Government
  - Body: Mandal Parishad
  - Tehsildar: M.Swamy Prasad

Area
  - Total: 119.75 km^{2} (46.24 sq mi)

Population (2011)
  - Total: 56,662
  - Density: 473.17/km^{2} (1,225.5/sq mi)

Languages
  - Official: Telugu
- Time zone: UTC+5:30 (IST)

Kollipara mandal is one of the 18 mandals in Guntur district of the state of Andhra Pradesh, India. It is under the administration of Tenali revenue division and the headquarters are located at Kollipara. The mandal is situated on the banks of the Krishna River, bordered by Duggirala, Tenali, Vemuru and Kollur mandal.

== Demographics ==
As of 2011 census, the mandal had a population of 56,662. The total population constitute, 27,953 males and 28,709 females —a sex ratio of 1027 females per 1000 males. 4,486 children are in the age group of 0–6 years, of which 2,268 are boys and 2,218 are girls —a ratio of 978 per 1000. The average literacy rate stands at 72.19% with 37,663 literates. Kollipara is the most populated and Kunchavaram is the least populated villages in the mandal.

== Administration ==
The present tahsildar is M.Swamy Prasad. The mandal forms a part of the Andhra Pradesh Capital Region, under the jurisdiction of APCRDA. Kollipara mandal belongs to Tenali (Assembly constituency) an assembly segment of Guntur (Lok Sabha constituency).

== Settlements ==
As of 2011 census, the mandal has 16 villages and no towns.

The settlements in the mandal are listed below:

1. Annavaram (Kollipara)
2. Annvarapu lanka(Annavarapu Lanka)
3. Athota
4. Bommuvaripalem
5. Chemudupadu
6. Chivaluru
7. Danthalur
8. Davuluru
9. Kollipara
10. Pidaparthi Palem
11. Kunchavaram
12. Munnangi
13. Pidaparru
14. Siripuram
15. Thumuluru
16. Vallabhapuram
17. Kothuru lanaka

== Education ==
The mandal plays a major role in education for the rural students of the nearby villages. The primary and secondary school education is imparted by government, aided and private schools, under the School Education Department of the state. As per the school information report for the academic year 2015–16, the mandal has more than 4,504 students enrolled in over 63 schools.

== See also ==
- List of mandals in Andhra Pradesh
- List of villages in Guntur district
