= Ananthavarappadu =

- Village
- Interactive map of Ananthavarappadu
- Location in Andhra Pradesh, India Ananthavarappadu (India)
- Coordinates: 16°14′06.2″N 80°27′13.4″E
- Country: India
- State: Andhra Pradesh
- District: Guntur

Government
  - Type: Gram panchayat

Area
  - Total: 15.59 km^{2} (6.02 sq mi)

Population (2011)
  - Total: 3,850

Languages
  - Official: Telugu
- Time zone: UTC+5:30 (IST)
- PIN: 522017
- Telephone code: 0863-2287
- Vehicle registration: AP–07
- Lok Sabha constituency: Guntur
- Vidhan Sabha constituency: Prathipadu

Ananthavarappadu is a village located in Guntur district of the Indian state of Andhra Pradesh. It is located in Vatticherukuru mandal of Guntur revenue division. Ananthavarappadu Village is Adopted by Galla Jayadev, Member of parliament for Guntur (Lok Sabha constituency) under the scheme of Sansad Adarsh Gram Yojana on 2014.

== Geography ==
It is spread over an area of 15.59 km (9.69 mi).
