= Tsunduru =

- Village
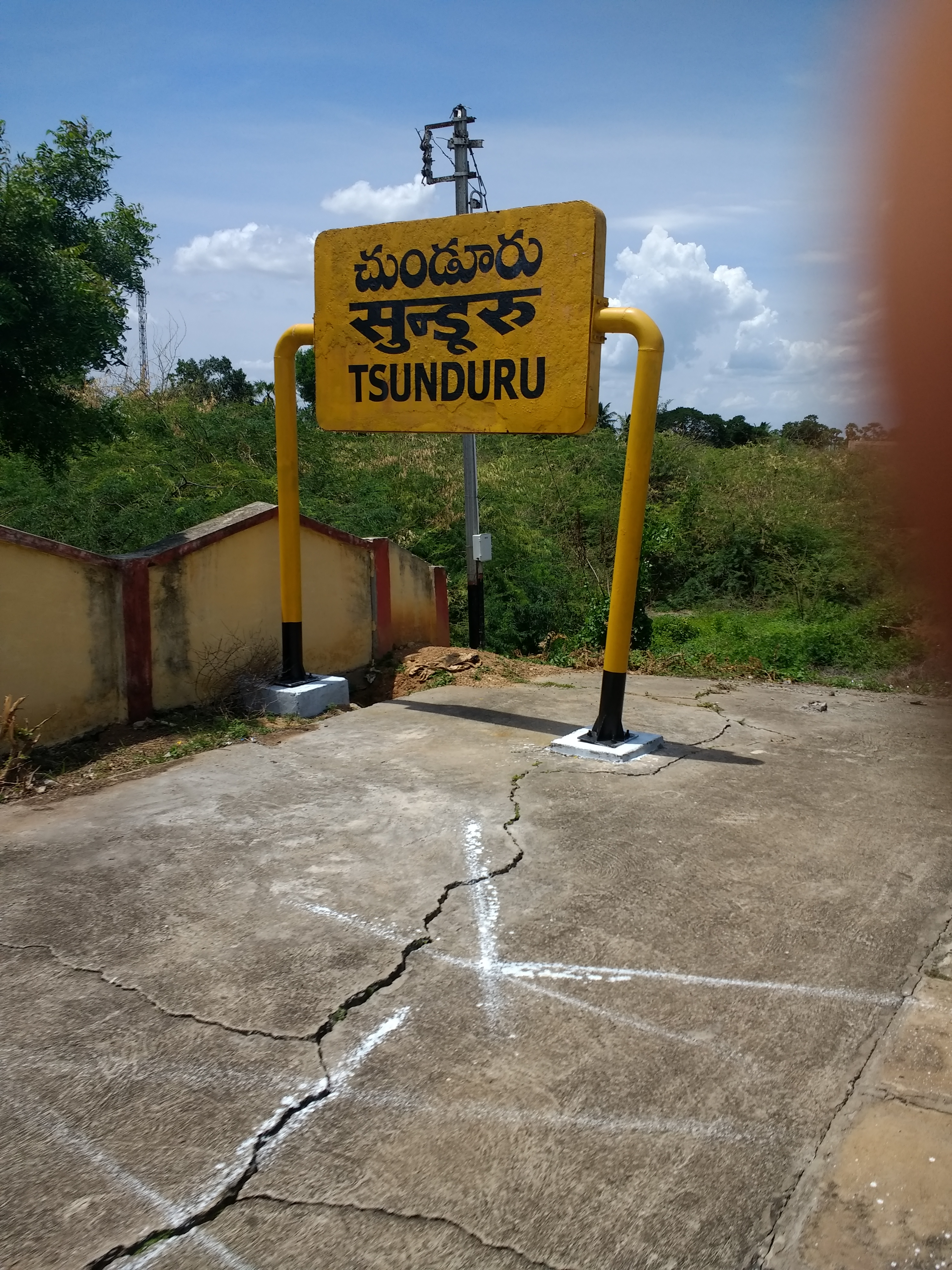
- Tsundur Train Station
- Interactive map of Tsunduru
- Location in Andhra Pradesh, India Tsunduru (India)
- Coordinates: 16.1583°N 80.583°E
- Country: India
- State: Andhra Pradesh
- District: Bapatla
- Elevation: 12 m (39 ft)

Population (2011)
  - Total: 5,965

Languages
  - Official: Telugu
- Time zone: UTC+5:30 (IST)
- Lok Sabha: Bapatla
- Vidhan Sabha: Vemuru

Tsunduru(ౘుండూరు) is a village in Bapatla district of the Indian state of Andhra Pradesh. It is the mandal headquarters of Tsundur mandal in Bapatla revenue division.

== Demographics ==
As of 2011 Census of India, the town had a population of 5,965. The total population constitute, 3,069 males, 2,896 females and 467 children, in the age group of 0–6 years. The average literacy rate stands at 69.94% with 3,845 literates, significantly lower than the national average of 73.00%.

== Dalit massacre ==
On 6 August 1991, 8 Dalits were murdered within the village when a mob of over 300 people, composed of mainly upper caste members, hunted down the victims along the bund of an irrigation canal. The incident happened after police allegedly asked locals to show aggression towards the Dalit population within the village, following recent tension among members of different castes in the area. During the resulting trial, 21 offenders were sentenced to life imprisonment for their involvement and 35 others to one year of imprisonment and a penalty of 2,000Rs each, on 31 July 2007, by the special judge under the SCs, STs (Prevention of Atrocities) Act.

== See also ==
- Villages in Tsundur mandal
