= NTR bus station =

Bus station in Andhra Pradesh, India

NTR Bus station
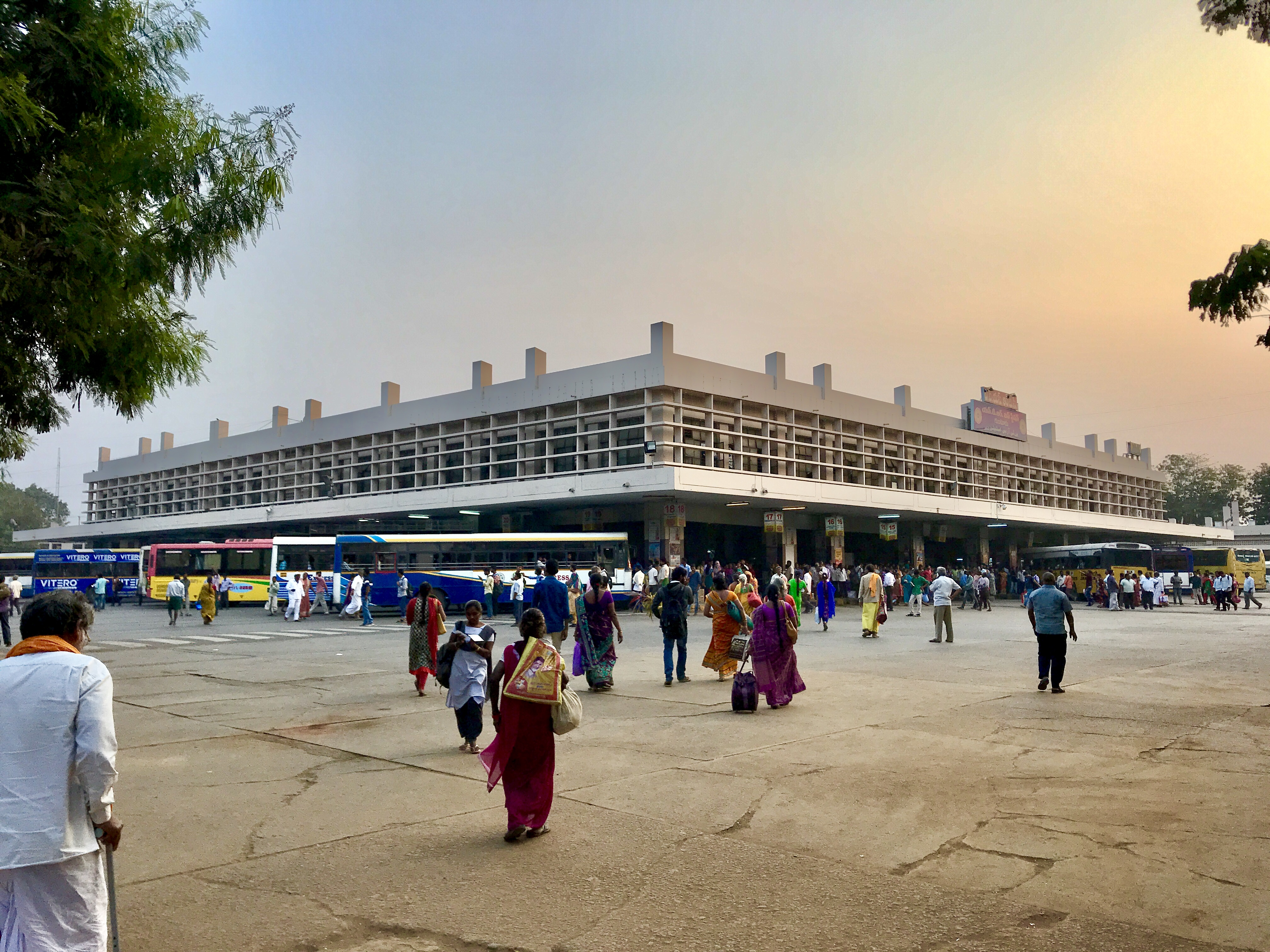
- Perspective view of NTR bus station in Guntur

General information
- Location: Guntur, Guntur district, Andhra Pradesh; India
- Coordinates: 16°17′44″N 80°27′22″E
- Owner: APSRTC
- Operator: APSRTC
- Platforms: 60
- Connections: Palnadu sector, Vijayawada sector

Construction
- Parking: Yes

Other information
- Station code: GNT

History
- Opened: 1990
Location
- Location within Andhra Pradesh Location within India

NTR bus station is a bus station in Guntur and owned by Andhra Pradesh State Road Transport Corporation. The bus station serves both the city and district services in Andhra Pradesh as well buses from neighboring states of Karnataka, Tamil Nadu and Telangana.

== History ==
- 2015 – Introduction of city bus services to the nearby destinations of Perecherla, Namburu, Yanamadala and Chebrolu.

== Structure and amenities ==
The bus station is spread over an area of 2.25 acres (0.91 ha) and handles more than 2000 buses everyday arriving from all the districts of the state. A new mini bus station with 13 platforms is being built in the premises of the present one, to run city and non stop services. It is one of the bus stations equipped with Wi-Fi in the state.
