= Tenali revenue division =

- revenue division in Guntur district
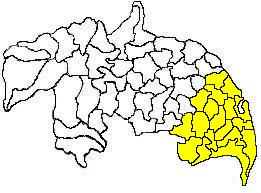
- Mandals in Tenali revenue division (in yellow) of Guntur district
- Country: India
- State: Andhra Pradesh
- District: Guntur

Tenali revenue division is an administrative division in the Guntur district of the Indian state of Andhra Pradesh. It comprises 8 mandals and is one of the two revenue divisions in the district, along with Guntur. Tenali serves as the headquarters of the division.

== Administration ==
The 8 mandals in Tenali revenue division are:

| No. | Mandals |
|---|---|
| 1 | Mangalagiri mandal |
| 2 | Tadepalle mandal |
| 3 | Tenali mandal |
| 4 | Kollipara mandal |
| 5 | Ponnur mandal |
| 6 | Chebrolu mandal |
| 7 | Duggirala mandal |
| 8 | Kakumanu mandal |

== See also ==
- List of revenue divisions in Andhra Pradesh
