= Kondapi mandal =

Maddipadu mandal
- Mandal
- Interactive map of Maddipadu mandal
- Location in Andhra Pradesh, India
- Coordinates: 15°59′N 80°02′E
- Country: India
- State: Andhra Pradesh
- District: Prakasam
- Headquarters: Kondapi

Population (2011)
  - Total: 43,004

Languages
  - Official: Telugu
- Time zone: UTC+5:30 (IST)

Kondapi mandal is in Prakasam district, Andhra Pradesh, India.

== Villages under Kondapi mandal ==
List of villages under the kondapi mandal.

- Chinna Venkanna Palem
- Gogineni vari Palem
- Chodavaram
- Ilavara
- Katta vari Palem
- Koru Uppalapadu
- Muppavaram
- Peridepi
- Petlur
- Thatakula Palem
- Vennuru
- Ankarlapudi
- Nennurupa
- Mugachintala
- Kattubadipalem
- Chavatapalem
- Polireddypalem
- Mittapalem
- Chinna kandlagunta
- Pedda kandlagunta
- koyavaripalem
- ponnaluru mandalam

The northern boundary of the mandal is formed by the Moosy River
