= Moosy River =

River in India

The Moosy River (also known as the Musi River) is a minor water body in the district of Prakasam.

== Geography ==
The Musi rises near Gotlagattu village in Nellore district at an elevation of about 200 m. at north latitude 15 32' and east longitude 79° 25' and flows in a south-easterly direction for a total length of 112 km. to join the Bay of Bengal.

The river Moosy rises near Dokkalasala in the Veligondas. It flows first east and then south through Markapur, Darsi, Northern border of Podili,Madduluru, Kondepi, Vennuru, Koru Uppalapadu, Tangutur, Alakurapadu and Kothapatnam Mandals falls into the Bay of Bengal near Madanur of Kothapatnam Mandal.

== Tributaries ==
Its tributaries are the Gajjaleru, Dondaleru and Atleru. It feeds tanks of Podili and Konakanamitla Mandals.

== See also ==
- Penna River
- Krishna River
