= Department of Social Welfare (Andhra Pradesh) =

Head of the Ministry of Social Welfare of the Government of Andhra Pradesh

Minister of Social Welfare
- Sāṅghika Saṅkṣēma Śākha Mantrī
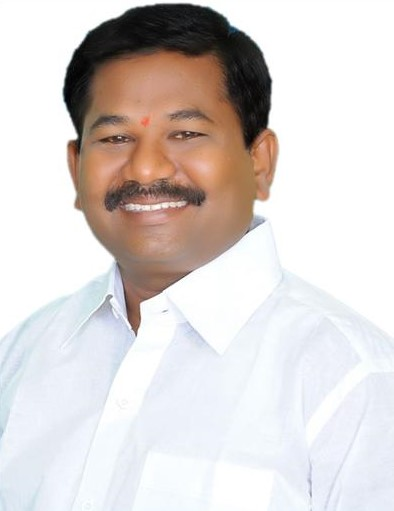
- Incumbent; Dola Sree Bala Veeranjaneya Swamy since 12 June 2024
- Department of Social Welfare
- Member of: Andha Pradesh Cabinet
- Reports to: Governor of Andhra Pradesh; Chief Minister of Andhra Pradesh; Andhra Pradesh Legislature
- Appointer: Governor of Andhra Pradesh on the advice of the chief minister of Andhra Pradesh
- Inaugural holder: Ravela Kishore Babu
- Formation: 8 June 2014
- Website: Official website

The Minister of Social Welfare or Minister of Social Welfare & Empowerment, is the head of the Department of Social Welfare of the Government of Andhra Pradesh.

The incumbent Minister of Social Welfare is Dola Sree Bala Veeranjaneya Swamy from the Telugu Desam Party.

== List of ministers ==
#	Portrait	Minister (Lifespan) Constituency	Term of office			Election (Term)	Party	Ministry	Chief Minister	Ref.
#	Portrait	Minister (Lifespan) Constituency	Term start	Term end	Duration	Election (Term)	Party	Ministry	Chief Minister	Ref.
1		Ravela Kishore Babu (born 1959); MLA for Prathipadu	8 June 2014	1 April 2017	2 years, 297 days	2014 (14th)	Telugu Desam Party	Naidu III	N. Chandrababu Naidu	
2		Nakka Ananda Babu (born 1966); MLA for Vemuru	2 April 2017	29 May 2019	2 years, 57 days	2014 (14th)	Telugu Desam Party	Naidu III	N. Chandrababu Naidu	
3		Pinipe Viswarup (born 1962); MLA for Amalapuram	30 May 2019	7 April 2022	2 years, 312 days	2019 (15th)	YSR Congress Party	Jagan	Y. S. Jagan Mohan Reddy	
4		Merugu Nagarjuna (born 1966); MLA for Vemuru	11 April 2022	11 June 2024	2 years, 61 days	2019 (15th)	YSR Congress Party	Jagan	Y. S. Jagan Mohan Reddy	
5		Dola Sree Bala Veeranjaneya Swamy (born 1971); MLA for Kondapi	12 June 2024	Incumbent	2 years, 87 days	2024 (16th)	Telugu Desam Party	Naidu IV	N. Chandrababu Naidu	
