= Dola Sree Bala Veeranjaneya Swamy =

Indian politician

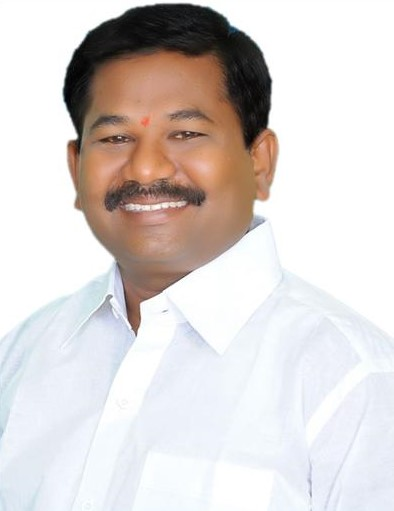
- Official portrait, 2024

Minister of Social Welfare Government of Andhra Pradesh
- Incumbent
- Assumed office 12 June 2024
- Governor: S. Abdul Nazeer
- Chief Minister: N. Chandrababu Naidu
- Preceded by: Merugu Nagarjuna

Minister of Disabled and Senior Citizens Welfare Government of Andhra Pradesh
- Incumbent
- Assumed office 12 June 2024
- Governor: S. Abdul Nazeer
- Chief Minister: N. Chandrababu Naidu
- Preceded by: K. V. Ushashri Charan

Minister of Sachivalayam and Village Volunteers Government of Andhra Pradesh
- Incumbent
- Assumed office 12 June 2024
- Governor: S. Abdul Nazeer
- Chief Minister: N. Chandrababu Naidu
- Preceded by: Office established

Member of the Andhra Pradesh Legislative Assembly
- Incumbent
- Assumed office 2014
- Preceded by: Gurrala Venkata Seshu
- Constituency: Kondapi

Personal details
- Party: Telugu Desam Party
- Occupation: Politician; Doctor

Dola Sree Bala Veeranjaneya Swamy (born 1971) is an Indian politician from Andhra Pradesh. He is an MLA of Telugu Desam Party from Kondapi Assembly Constituency which is reserved for SC community in Prakasam District. He won the 2024 Andhra Pradesh Legislative Assembly election. He is included in the cabinet of the Fourth N. Chandrababu Naidu ministry. He is given the Social Welfare department with an additional charge of sachivalayam and gram volunteers.

== Early life and education ==
Swamy hails from Thurpu Naidupalem, Tangutur Mandal, Prakasam District. His father's name is Dola Kotaiah. He completed his MBBS from Andhra Medical College, Visakhapatnam in 1997.

== Career ==
Swamy won the 2019 Andhra Pradesh Legislative Assembly Election when he defeated Madasi Venkaiah by a narrow margin of 1,024 votes. He was first elected as MLA winning the 2014 Andhra Pradesh Legislative Assembly Election defeating Jupudi Prabhakara Rao of YSR Congress Party by a margin of 5,440 votes. He served as chairman of the Committee of Privileges and a member of the Committee on SC & ST Welfare as a TDP member. He also served as a member of the Tirupati Thirumala Devasthanam Board. He won the 2019 Andhra Pradesh Legislative Assembly election. He polled 98,142 votes and defeated Madasi Venkaiah of YSR Congress Party by a narrow margin of 1,024 votes. But he retained the Kondapi seat in the 2024 Andhra Pradesh Legislative Assembly election defeating Audimulapu Suresh of YSR Congress Party by a margin of 24,756 votes.
