= Vennuru =

- Interactive map of Vennuru
- Location in Andhra Pradesh, India Vennuru (India)
- Coordinates: 15°22′48″N 79°55′01″E
- Country: India
- State: Andhra Pradesh
- District: Prakasam

Population (2011)
  - Total: 3,312

Languages
  - Official: Telugu
- Time zone: UTC+5:30 (IST)
- PIN: 523279
- Vehicle registration: AP
- Assembly constituency: Kondapi (SC)
- Climate: hot (Köppen)

Vennuru is a village in Prakasam District, in the state of Andhra Pradesh, India. This village comes under Kondapi Mandal in Kandukur revenue division. Nearby villages are Chodavaram, Venkanna Palem, Koru Uppalapadu, Thumadu and Muppavaram.

== Geography ==
Vennuru is located at 15°22'44.5"N 79°54'55.3"E. It has an average elevation of 19 meters (65 feet). Total geographical area of Vennuru village is 15 km2 and it is the 5th biggest village by area in the sub district. Population density of the village is 214 persons per km2.

== Demographics ==
As of 2011 census, Vennuru had a population of 3312, from 310 Households. Male constitutes 49.4% of the population and female 50.6%. Vennuru has a very good literacy rate of 61.4%, of which 56% male and 44% female. Of the total population, 9.4% are under 6 years of age. Telugu is the local language.

== Politics ==
Vennuru comes under Kondapi (SC) reserved constituency of Andhra Pradesh Legislative Assembly. Gorepati Sandhya Rani Choudhary is the elective Sarpanch and Sree Bala Veeranjaneya Swamy Dola is the present MLA of the constituency from Telugu Desam Party. It is also a part of Ongole Parliamentary constituency which was won by Magunta Sreenivasulu Reddy of YSR Congress Party.

== See also ==
- Ongole
- Tangutur
- Kondapi
- Kandukur
