= Mugachintala =

Coordinates: 15°38′N 79°32′E

Mugachintala is an Indian village located in Kondapi mandal of Prakasam district, Andhra Pradesh. In 2011, the village was home to 365 families with a total population of 2061: 1058 males and 1003 females. Mugachintala is located 42 km (26 mi) from Ongole and 10 km (6.2 mi) from Kondapi.
