= Musi River =

The Musi River may refer to:

- Musi River (India), a tributary of the Krishna River in Andhra Pradesh
- Moosy River, also known as the Musi River, Telangana, India
- Musi River (Indonesia)

== See also ==
- Musi (disambiguation)
