= Damacharla Anjaneyulu =

Indian politician (1930–2007)

Damacharla Anjaneyulu (15 July 1930 – 22 September 2007) was an Indian politician from Andhra Pradesh. He was a former three time member of the Andhra Pradesh Legislative Assembly from the Kondapi Assembly constituency which is reserved for the Scheduled Caste community, in Prakasam district representing the Telugu Desam Party.

== Career ==
Anjaneyulu first became an MLA winning the Kondapi Assembly constituency in the 1994 Andhra Pradesh Legislative Assembly election representingn the Telugu Desam Party. He polled 55,913 votes and defeated his nearest rival, Achyutakumar Gundapaneni of the Indian National Congress, by 20,955 votes. He retained the Kondapi seat for the TDP winning the 1999 Andhra Pradesh Legislative Assembly election, where he polled 61,824 votes, and defeated his closest opponent, Pothula Rama Rao of the Indian National Congress, by 10,952 votes.

His statues were erected at East Naidu Palem and Mallavarappadu where his jayanthi is observed every year by his followers.
