= Kondapalli (disambiguation) =

Kondapalli is a suburb of Vijayawada, in Krishna District, Andhra Pradesh, India.

Kondapalli may refer to:

- Kondapalle, East Godavari district, a village in East Godavari district of Andhra Pradesh, India
- Kondapalli Fort, a fort in Kondapalli village of Krishna district in Andhra Pradesh, India
- Kondapally Toys, popular toys made in Kondapalli village of Krishna district in Andhra Pradesh, India
- Kondapalli Seetharamaiah (1914—2002), Indian communist leader
- Kondapalli Raja, a 1993 Telugu-language film
