= Manugunta Maheedhar Reddy =

Indian politician

Member of Legislative Assembly Andhra Pradesh
- In office 2019–2024
- Preceded by: Inturi Nageswara Rao
- Succeeded by: Potluri Rama Rao
- Constituency: Kandukur
- In office 2004–2014
- Preceded by: Divi Sivaram
- Succeeded by: Potluri Rama Rao
- Constituency: Kandukur
- In office 1989–1994
- Preceded by: Magunta Adinarayan Reddy
- Succeeded by: Divi Sivaram
- Constituency: Kandukur

Manugunta Maheedhar Reddy (born 1 June 1957) is an Indian politician from Andhra Pradesh. He is a four time MLA from Kandukur Assembly Constituency in Parkasam District. He won the 2019 Andhra Pradesh Legislative Assembly Election on YSR Congress Party ticket. He was denied a ticket to contest the 2024 Andhra Pradesh Legislative Assembly Election.

== Early life and education ==
Reddy is born in Machavaram village, Kandukur mandal, Prakasam District. His late father Manugunta Adinarayana Reddy, was a former MLA and his mother Lalitha is a housewife. After completing his intermediate, the two year pre university course, from Sarvodaya College, Nellore, he studied B.Com. and LLB from S. V. Arts College. He married Jyothi and has two daughters Bhavya and Sathya.

== Career ==
Reddy started his political journey with Indian National Congress in 1989 following the footsteps of his late father. He was elected as an MLA for the first time winning the 1989 Andhra Pradesh Legislative Assembly Election from Kandukur Assembly Constituency on INC ticket. He was denied a Congress ticket and contested as an independent in 1994 and lost the election. In 1999, he was nominated by the Congress Party but lost the election again. He regained the seat for a second term from Kandukur Constituency on Congress ticket in the 2004 Andhra Pradesh Legislative Assembly Election when he defeated Divi Siva Ram of Telugu Desam Party by a margin of 7,879 votes. He was elected for the third time from Kandukur representing Congress in the 2009 Andhra Pradesh Legislative Assembly Election defeating TDP's Divi Siva Ram again by a narrow margin of 4,243 votes. He served in the Congress government as Minister for Municipal Administration and Urban Development under former chief minister Kiran Kumar Reddy.

Later, he joined YSR Congress Party in July 2017 and won the 2019 Andhra Pradesh Legislative Assembly Election defeating Pothula Rama Rao of Telugu Desam Party by a margin of 14,637 votes.
