= Tanguturi (disambiguation) =

Tanguturi is a Telugu toponymic surname from Tangutur, Andhra Pradesh, India. It primarily refers to Tanguturi Prakasam, an Indian politician and independence activist.

It may also refer to:

- Tanguturi Anjaiah or T. Anjaiah, Indian politician and chief minister of Andhra Pradesh
- Tanguturi Suryakumari or Suryakumari, Indian actress and singer
