= List of ministers of tribal welfare of Andhra Pradesh =

Head of the Ministry of Tribal Welfare of the Government of Andhra Pradesh

Minister of Tribal Welfare
- Girijana Saṅkṣēma Śākha Mantrī
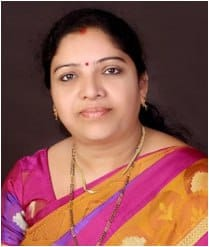
- Incumbent; Gummadi Sandhya Rani since 12 June 2024
- Department of Tribal Welfare
- Member of: Andha Pradesh Cabinet
- Reports to: Governor of Andhra Pradesh; Chief Minister of Andhra Pradesh; Andhra Pradesh Legislature
- Appointer: Governor of Andhra Pradesh on the advice of the chief minister of Andhra Pradesh
- Inaugural holder: Ravela Kishore Babu
- Formation: 8 June 2014
- Website: Official website

The Minister of Tribal Welfare, is the head of the Department of Tribal Welfare of the Government of Andhra Pradesh.

The incumbent Minister of Tribal Welfare is Gummadi Sandhya Rani from the Telugu Desam Party.

== List of ministers ==
#	Portrait	Minister (Lifespan) Constituency	Term of office			Election (Term)	Party	Ministry	Chief Minister	Ref.
#	Portrait	Minister (Lifespan) Constituency	Term start	Term end	Duration	Election (Term)	Party	Ministry	Chief Minister	Ref.
1		Ravela Kishore Babu (born 1959); MLA for Prathipadu	8 June 2014	1 April 2017	2 years, 297 days	2014 (14th)	Telugu Desam Party	Naidu III	N. Chandrababu Naidu	
2		Nakka Ananda Babu (born 1966); MLA for Vemuru	2 April 2017	10 November 2018	1 year, 222 days	2014 (14th)	Telugu Desam Party	Naidu III	N. Chandrababu Naidu	
3		Kidari Sravan Kumar (born 1991); Provisional	11 November 2018	9 May 2019	179 days	2014 (14th)	Telugu Desam Party	Naidu III	N. Chandrababu Naidu	
4		Pamula Pushpa Sreevani (born 1986); MLA for Kurupam	30 May 2019	7 April 2022	2 years, 312 days	2019 (15th)	YSR Congress Party	Jagan	Y. S. Jagan Mohan Reddy	
5		Peedika Rajanna Dora (born 1965); MLA for Salur	11 April 2022	11 June 2024	2 years, 61 days	2019 (15th)	YSR Congress Party	Jagan	Y. S. Jagan Mohan Reddy	
6		Gummadi Sandhya Rani (born 1973); MLA for Salur	12 June 2024	Incumbent	2 years, 87 days	2024 (16th)	Telugu Desam Party	Naidu IV	N. Chandrababu Naidu	
