= Ganikapudi =

- Village
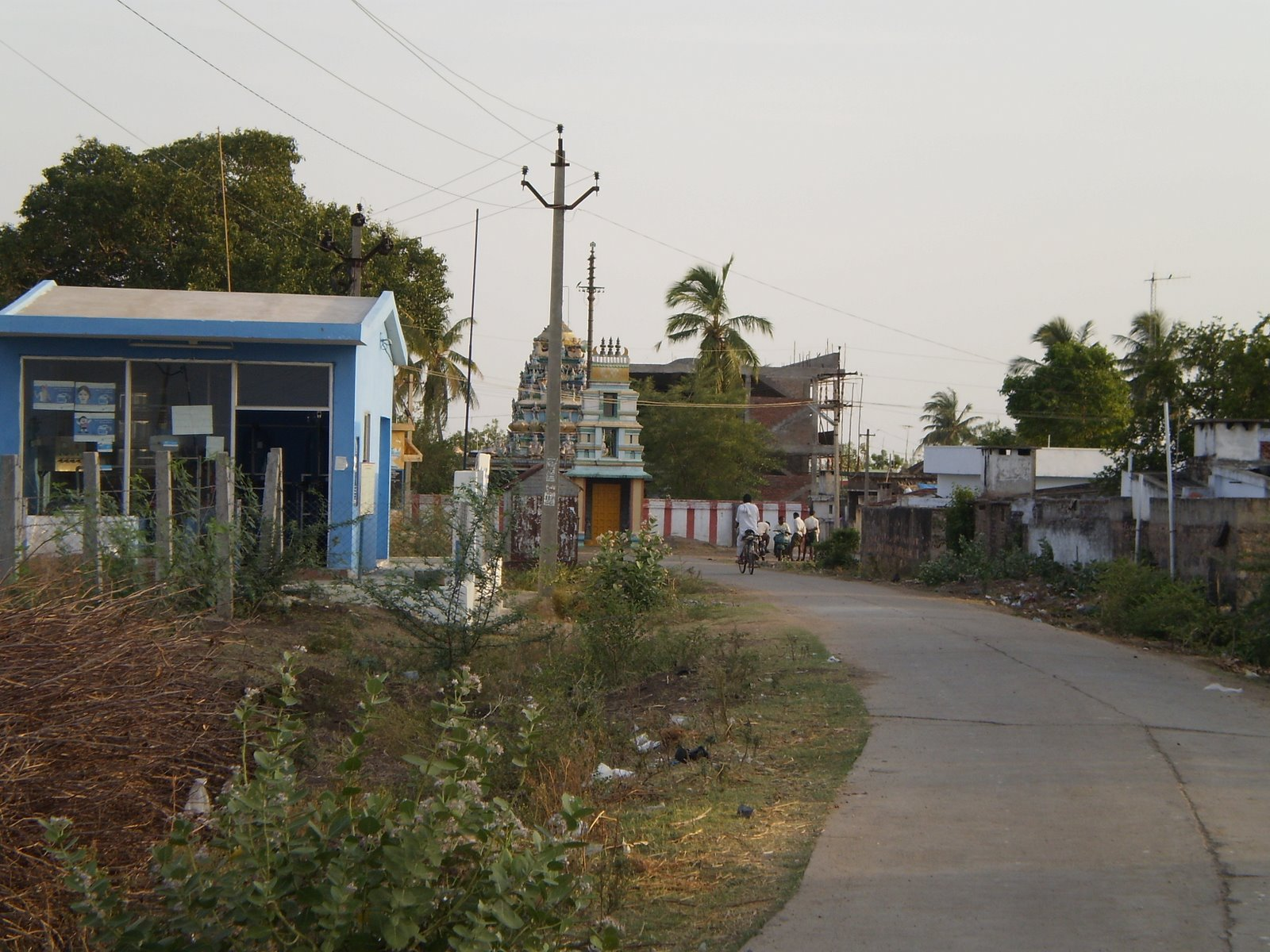
- Entrance of Ganikapudi village
- Interactive map of Ganikapudi
- Location in Andhra Pradesh, India
- Coordinates: 16°09′07″N 80°16′52″E
- Country: India
- State: Andhra Pradesh
- District: Guntur
- Mandal: Prathipadu

Government
  - Type: Panchayati raj
  - Body: Ganikapudi gram panchayat

Area
  - Total: 530 ha (1,300 acres)

Population (2011)
  - Total: 1,929
  - Density: 360/km^{2} (940/sq mi)

Languages
  - Official: Telugu
- Time zone: UTC+5:30 (IST)
- PIN: 522xxx
- Area code: +91–
- Vehicle registration: AP

Ganikapudi is a village in Guntur district of the Indian state of Andhra Pradesh. It is located in Prathipadu mandal of Guntur revenue division.

== Geography ==
Ganikapudi is located at an average altitude of 26 m (85 ft).

== Government and politics ==
Ganikapudi gram panchayat is the local self-government of the village. It is divided into wards and each ward is represented by a ward member. The ward members are headed by a Sarpanch. The village forms a part of Andhra Pradesh Capital Region and is under the jurisdiction of APCRDA.

Ganikapudi is a part of Prathipadu assembly constituency for Andhra Pradesh Legislative Assembly. Mekkathoti Sucharita is the present MLA of the constituency from YSRC Party. It is in turn a part of Guntur (Lok Sabha constituency).

== Education ==
As per the school information report for the academic year 2018–19, the village has a total of 2 Mandal Parishad schools.
