= Ravela Kishore Babu =

Indian politician

Minister of Tribal Welfare; Social Welfare Government of Andhra Pradesh
- In office 8 June 2014 – 1 April 2017
- Governor: E. S. L. Narasimhan
- Chief Minister: N. Chandrababu Naidu
- Preceded by: Office established
- Succeeded by: Nakka Ananda Babu

Member of Legislative Assembly, Andhra Pradesh
- In office 2014–2019
- Preceded by: Mekathoti Sucharitha
- Succeeded by: Mekathoti Sucharitha
- Constituency: Prathipadu

Personal details
- Born: Ravela, Andhra Pradesh, India
- Party: YSR Congress Party (since 2024)
- Other political affiliations: Telugu Desam Party (until 2018); Jana Sena Party (2018–2019); Bharatiya Janata Party (2019–2022); Bharat Rashtra Samithi (2023–2024)
- Spouse: Shanthi Jyothi
- Children: 2
- Occupation: Politician

Ravela Kishore Babu is an Indian politician from the state of Andhra Pradesh. He is former Member of the Legislative Assembly from Prathipadu, Guntur Assembly constituency, elected in the 2014 Andhra Pradesh Legislative Assembly election. He was a former member of the Telugu Desam Party. He quit TDP in 2018 and joined Jana Sena Party. In June 2019 he quit JSP in order to join Bharatiya Janata Party. In 2022 he quit BJP citing personal reasons. In January 2023 he joined BRS. In 2024 he joined the YSR Congress Party.

Babu is a retired IRTS officer.
