= Kondapalle, Kakinada district =

Kondapalle
- Village
- Interactive map of Kondapalle
- Location in Andhra Pradesh, India Kondapalle (India)
- Coordinates: 17.402089°N 82.256261°E
- Country: India
- State: Andhra Pradesh
- District: Kakinada
- Mandal: Prathipadu

Population (2011)
  - Total: 168

Languages
  - Official: Telugu
- Time zone: UTC+5:30 (IST)
- Vehicle registration: AP

Kondapalle is a village in Prathipadu mandal, located in Kakinada district of the Indian state of Andhra Pradesh.
