= Burla Ramanjaneyulu =

Indian politician

Member of the Andhra Pradesh Legislative Assembly
- Incumbent
- Assumed office 2024
- Preceded by: Mekathoti Sucharitha
- Constituency: Prathipadu, Guntur

Personal details
- Party: Telugu Desam Party

Burla Ramanjaneyulu is an Indian politician from Andhra Pradesh. He is a member of Telugu Desam Party.

== Political career ==
Ramanjaneyulu has been elected as the Member of the Legislative Assembly representing the Prathipadu, Guntur Assembly constituency. He won the 2024 Andhra Pradesh Legislative Assembly elections. He won the elections by a margin of 42015 votes defeating Balasani Kiran Kumar of the YSR Congress Party.

He was born in Alur Village of Kurnool district, Andhra Pradesh.

== Electoral performance ==
2024 Andhra Pradesh Legislative Assembly election: Prathipadu
Party	Candidate	Votes	%	±%
TDP	Burla Ramanjaneyulu	128,665	58.09	▲17.63
YSRCP	Balasani Kiran Kumar	86,650	39.12	▼4.86
INC	Korivi Vinaya Kumar	3,491	1.58	
NOTA	None Of The Above	1,389	0.63	
Majority		42,015	18.97	▲15.45
Turnout		2,21,479	83.72	▼0.21
TDP hold		Swing		
