= Prathipadu mandal =

- Mandal
- Interactive Map Outlining mandal
- Location within Andhra Pradesh
- Country: India
- State: Andhra Pradesh
- District: Guntur
- Headquarters: Prathipadu

Government
  - Body: Mandal Parishad

Area
  - Total: 122.97 km^{2} (47.48 sq mi)

Population (2011)
  - Total: 49,390
  - Density: 401.6/km^{2} (1,040/sq mi)

Languages
  - Official: Telugu
- Time zone: UTC+5:30 (IST)
- PIN: 522019

Prathipadu mandal is one of the 18 mandals in Guntur district of the Indian state of Andhra Pradesh. It is under the administration of Guntur revenue division and the headquarters are located at Prathipadu.

== Villages ==
1. Edulapalem	2. Enamadala	3. Ganikapudi	4. Gottipadu	5. Kondajagarlamudi	
6. Kondepadu	7. Mallayapalem	8. Nadimpalem	9. Prathipadu	10. Vangipuram	11. Kondrupadu
