= Koru Uppalapadu =

Koru Uppalapadu K. Uppalapadu
- Village
- Interactive map of Koru Uppalapadu
- Location in Andhra Pradesh, India Koru Uppalapadu (India)
- Coordinates: 15.371333°N 79.94339°E
- Country: India
- State: Andhra Pradesh
- District: Prakasam
- Mandal: Kondapi

Government
  - Type: Village Panchayat
  - Body: Sarpanch

Population (2011)
  - Total: 2,968

Languages
  - Official: Telugu
- Time zone: UTC+5:30 (IST)
- PIN: 523279
- Telephone code: 08598
- Vehicle registration: AP27
- Website: Gram Panchayat website

Koru Uppalapadu (or K.Uppalapadu) is a village in Kondapi mandal, located in Prakasam district of the Indian state of Andhra Pradesh. It belongs to Kandukur revenue division.

== Demographics ==
As of 2011 census, the village had a population of 2,968, with 1,456 males and 1,512 females (a sex ratio of 1038 females per 1000 males), and 219 children aged 0 to 6 years. The average literacy rate was 70.14%, higher than the state average of 67.41%.

== Agriculture ==
Cash crops, like tobacco, subabul, peanuts, and food crops, like rice and pulses, are grown in this region. K. Uppalapadu is located in between (west of) Tanguturu and (east of) Kondapi towns.

== Political ==
K. Uppalapadu belongs to the Kondapi Assembly constituency. Local political figures are Gundapaneni Pattabhi Ramayya Chowdary and Gundapaneni Achuta Kumar.

K. Uppalapadu is a Village Panchayat administered by Sarpanch, currently Vaka Koteswaramma is the Sarpanch of the village.

== Education ==
Most children in the village are educated, with the literacy rate increasing. K. Uppalapadutis has the only residential English medium school in Kondapi Mandal with good education standards, Paparao Public School. The village also has a Government Elementary School and a Government ZPP High School.

== Transport ==
Koru Uppalapadu is well connected by road. It is on the NH5/AH45, connecting Tanguturu Kondapi. It isconnected directly to Ongole via Nidamanuru and Kandukur through village dirt roads. APSRTC bus services run from Ongole and Tanguturu. The village also has Indian Oil station in the west.
