= Inturi Nageswara Rao =

Indian politician (born 1977)

Member of Legislative Assembly Andhra Pradesh
- Incumbent
- Assumed office 2024
- Preceded by: Manugunta Maheedhar Reddy
- Constituency: Kandukur

Personal details
- Born: 1977 (age 48–49)
- Party: Telugu Desam Party

Inturi Nageswara Rao (born 1977 in Badevaaripalem village in Valetivari palem mandal) is an Indian politician from Andhra Pradesh. He is an MLA from Kandukur Assembly constituency in Nellore district. He represents Telugu Desam Party. He won the 2024 Andhra Pradesh Legislative Assembly election where Telugu Desam Party had an alliance with BJP and JSP.

== Early life and education ==
Rao hails from Kandukur. His late father Inturi Subba Rao was a farmer. He is a businessman and also cultivates his own land. He completed his Class 10 from Zilla Parishad high school, Kandukur in 1991.

== Career ==
Rao won the 2024 Andhra Pradesh Legislative Assembly election representing Telugu Desam Party from Kandukur Assembly constituency. He polled 109,173 votes and defeated Burra Madhu Sudhan Yadav of YSR Congress Party by a margin of 18,558 votes.
