= Mekathoti Sucharitha =

Indian politician

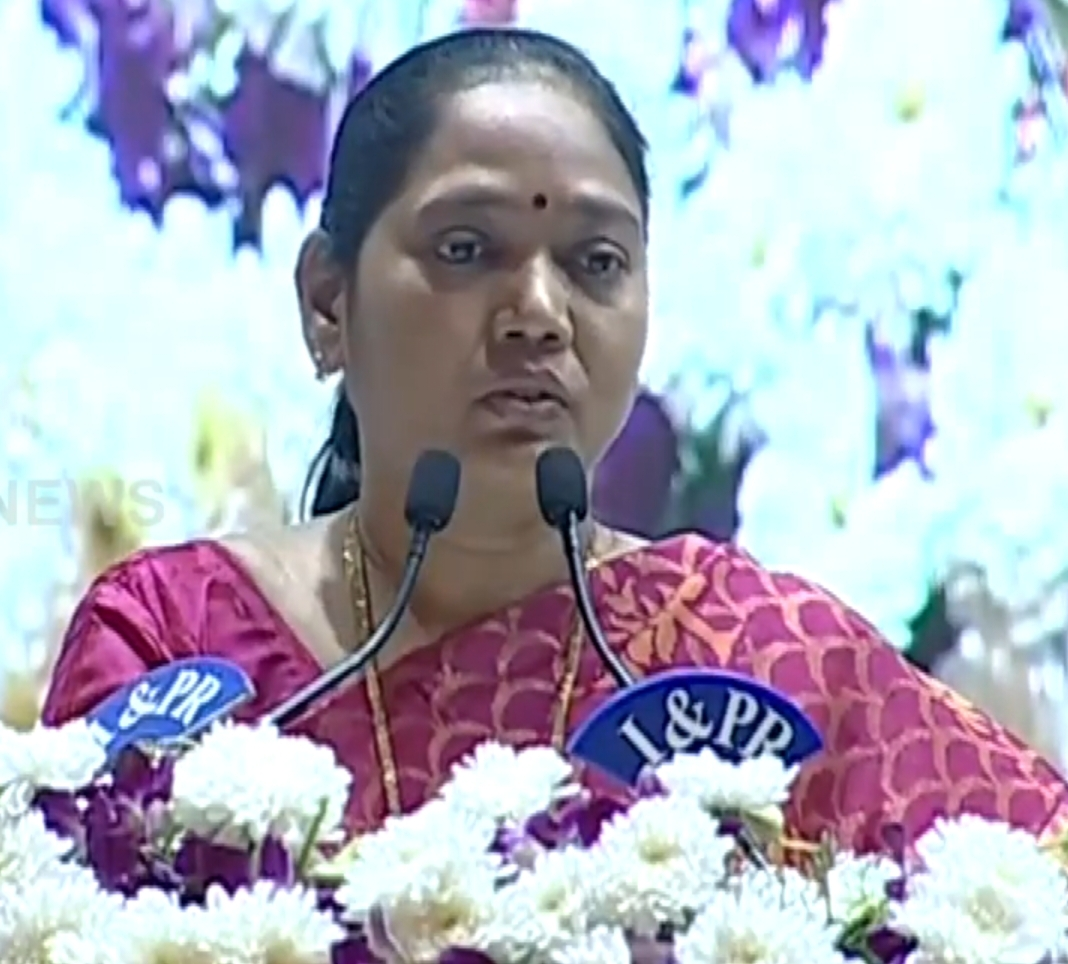
- Sucharitha in 2019

Minister of Home Affairs Government of Andhra Pradesh
- In office 8 Jun 2019 – 7 April 2022
- Governor: E. S. L. Narasimhan; Biswabhusan Harichandan
- Chief Minister: Y. S. Jagan Mohan Reddy
- Preceded by: Nimmakayala Chinarajappa
- Succeeded by: Taneti Vanitha

Member of Legislative Assembly Andhra Pradesh
- In office 2019–2024
- Preceded by: Ravela Kishore Babu
- Succeeded by: Burla Ramanjaneyulu
- Constituency: Prathipadu
- In office 2009–2014
- Preceded by: Ravi Venkata Ramana
- Succeeded by: Ravela Kishore Babu
- Constituency: Prathipadu

Personal details
- Born: 25 December 1972 (age 53) Phirangipuram
- Party: YSR Congress Party
- Other political affiliations: Indian National Congress

Mekathoti Sucharitha is an Indian politician who is the former Minister of Home Affairs and Disaster Management of Andhra Pradesh in Y.S.Jagan Mohan Reddy cabinet. She is a member of YSR Congress Party.

== Political career ==
Sucharitha was elected as an MLA from Prathipadu segment for the first time in 2009 on Congress ticket. She was inducted into the Congress by the late Dr. Y S Rajashekara Reddy (YSR) after he spotted her during his historic ‘padayatra’ in 2003. Groomed by YSR during his tenure as chief minister of undivided Andhra Pradesh, Sucharitha's rise to the cabinet rank began in 2006 when she won the Zilla Parishad Territorial Constituencies (ZPTC) election from Phirangipuram in Guntur as a Congress candidate. She served for two years as ZPTC member.

In 2009, YSR allotted her the party ticket for Prathipadu Assembly Constituency in Guntur district from where she won comfortably. After YSR's death in September 2009, she swore allegiance to Y S Jagan Mohan Reddy and resigned from Congress when Jagan launched YSRCP in March 2011. She again won from the seat on a YSRCP ticket in the by-elections held in May 2012.

Despite conceding her seat to the TDP in 2014, Sucharitha's loyalty to the YSR family was rewarded with Jagan again allotting her the YSRCP ticket in the 2019 assembly elections. She defeated two heavyweights — former minister D Manikya Vara Prasad of the TDP and former TDP minister Ravela Kishore Babu, who joined Jana Sena Party.

== Personal life ==
Sucharitha, who hails from Phirangipuram in Guntur, is married to IRS officer M Dayasagar who is now posted as Commissioner of Income Tax (Appeal) in Jabalpur, Madhyapradesh. Her father N Anka Rao was a medical doctor at a government hospital. He later ran a clinic in Phirangipuram. She completed her BA in Political Science in 1990.
