= Ethamukkala =

- Village
- Interactive map of Ethamukkala
- Location within Andhra Pradesh Location within India
- Coordinates: 15.3744511°N 80.1136569°E
- Country: India
- State: Andhra Pradesh
- District: Prakasam
- Mandal: Kothapatnam

Population
  - Total: 7,454
- Time zone: UTC+05:30 (IST)

Ethamukkala is a village in Kothapatnam mandal, located in Prakasam district of Andhra Pradesh 18 kilometres (11 mi) from District headquarter Ongole.

== History ==
Ethamukkala has a documented history dating back to the medieval period. A bilingual Sanskrit and Telugu inscription dated to 1111–1112 A.D. (Saka year 1033), physically located at the Ramalinga temple in the neighboring village of Madanur, explicitly mentions Ethamukkala (historically recorded as Ítamukkala). The stone edict registers a donation of five gadyanas by a man named Gosanayya, son of Virreddi, to maintain a perpetual lamp for the temple of Ramesvaradeva in Ethamukkala.

== Culture ==
The village has an ancient temple, Sree Jwala Mukhi Amma temple, for its village Goddess.

Shiva Rathri is a major festival celebrated by the people of this village and the nearby village of Madanuru. Both villages celebrate the Ratha Yatra for Lord Siva during this festival with devotional unity, irrespective of their caste and religion.

== Education ==
The village has the SUVR & SR Govt Polytechnic for women

India.
