= Madanur =

Madanur మదనూరు
- Village
- Interactive map of Madanur
- Location within Andhra Pradesh Location within India
- Coordinates: 15.3635207°N 80.1073938°E
- Country: India
- State: Andhra Pradesh
- District: Prakasam
- Mandal: Kothapatnam

Population
  - Total: 7,454
- Time zone: UTC+05:30 (IST)

Madanur (also spelled Madanuru) is a coastal village located in the Kothapatnam mandal of the Prakasam district in the Indian state of Andhra Pradesh.

== History ==
=== Early history ===
Madanur possesses historical significance dating back to the medieval period. An inscription found near the flagpole (dhwajasthambam) of the village's Ramalinga temple, dated to 1111–1112 A.D. (Saka year 1033), records a religious endowment made by a donor named Gosanayya, the son of Vireddi. According to the bilingual Sanskrit and Telugu record, he gifted five gadyanas (a historical currency) to a temple official named Simabhatta to maintain a perpetual lamp for the deity Ramesvaradeva of neighboring Itamukkala (modern-day Ethamukkala).

=== Vijayanagara period ===
By the 16th century, Madanur had come under the administration of the Vijayanagara Empire. A stone inscription found in the village's Ramalingeswara temple, dating to approximately 1517–1518 A.D. (during the reign of emperor Krishnadevaraya), records significant architectural additions and land grants.

According to the translation, the emperor's prominent minister, Saluva Timmarasu, dismantled the older sanctuary to construct a new bhoga mandapa (pavilion) and a protective enclosure wall for the attendant deities. To maintain the temple, Timmarasu officially granted the village of Madanur to an individual named Katta Malaya to ensure the continuous provision of amritapadi (sacred food offerings) for the deity. The edict is also notable for recording the exact historical boundaries of the village, identifying the sea to the east and the Inangaleru river to the west.

== Geography ==
Madanur is situated near the coast of the Bay of Bengal. It is located approximately 11 kilometers from the sub-district headquarters in Kothapatnam, and is governed as a gram panchayat. The village's coastal area includes Madanur Beach, a local tourist and fishing spot situated near the neighboring village of Ethamukkala.

== Demographics ==
According to the 2011 Census of India, Madanur has a total population of 6,598, consisting of 3,315 males and 3,283 females residing across 1,830 households. Children between the ages of 0–6 number 767, making up 11.62% of the village's total population. The average literacy rate stands at 58.55%, with male literacy at 66.78% and female literacy at 50.28%.

== Culture ==
Due to its coastal location, fishing is a prominent aspect of the local economy and culture. During the Sankranti festival, the village of Madanuru Peddapalem and surrounding hamlets (such as Swarnandhra Pattapupalem and Eethamukkala Palle palem) actively participate in traditional boat races, swimming competitions, and rangoli-making organized by the Fishermen Welfare Committee.
