= Kandukur Assembly constituency =

Constituency of the Andhra Pradesh Legislative Assembly, India

Coordinates: 15.22°N 79.90°E

Kandukur
- Constituency No. 109 for the Andhra Pradesh Legislative Assembly
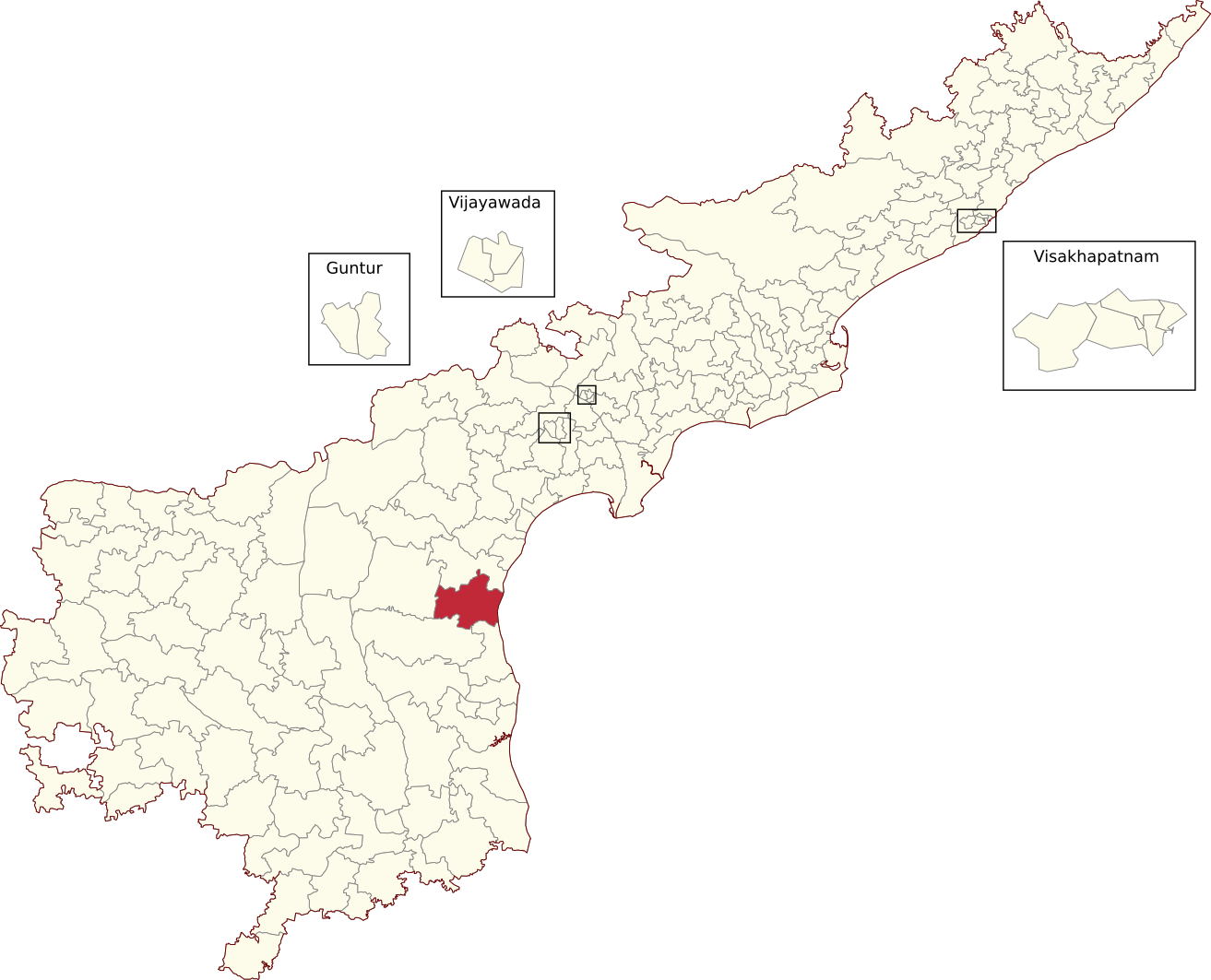
- Location of Kandukur Assembly constituency within Andhra Pradesh

Constituency details
- Country: India
- Region: South India
- State: Andhra Pradesh
- District: Prakasam
- Lok Sabha constituency: Nellore
- Established: 1951
- Total electors: 218,859
- Reservation: None

Member of Legislative Assembly
- 16th Andhra Pradesh Legislative Assembly
- Incumbent Inturi Nageswara Rao
- Party: TDP
- Alliance: NDA
- Elected year: 2024

Kandukur Assembly constituency is a constituency in Prakasam district of Andhra Pradesh that elects representatives to the Andhra Pradesh Legislative Assembly in India. It is one of the seven assembly segments of Nellore Lok Sabha constituency.

Inturi Nageswara Rao is the current MLA of the constituency, having won the 2024 Andhra Pradesh Legislative Assembly election from Telugu Desam Party. As of 2019, there are a total of 218,859 electors in the constituency. The constituency was established in 1951, as per the Delimitation Orders (1951).

== Mandals ==
The five mandals that form the assembly constituency are:

Mandal
Lingasamudram
Voletivaripalem
Kandukur
Gudluru
Ulavapadu

== Members of the Legislative Assembly ==
Year	Member	Political party
1952	Nalamothu Chenchurama Naidu	Indian National Congress
1955	Divi Kondaiah Chowdary	Indian National Congress
1962	Nalamothu Chenchurama Naidu	Indian National Congress
1967	Nalamothu Chenchurama Naidu	Indian National Congress
1972	M. Audinarayana Reddy	Independent politician
1978	Divi Kondaiah Chowdary	Indian National Congress
1983	M. Audinarayana Reddy	Indian National Congress
1985	M. Audinarayana Reddy	Indian National Congress
1989	Manugunta Maheedhar Reddy	Indian National Congress
1994	Divi Sivaram	Telugu Desam Party
1999	Divi Sivaram	Telugu Desam Party
2004	Manugunta Maheedhar Reddy	Indian National Congress
2009	Manugunta Maheedhar Reddy	Indian National Congress
2014	Pothula Ramarao	YSR Congress Party
2019	Manugunta Maheedhar Reddy	YSR Congress Party
2024	Inturi Nageswara Rao	Telugu Desam Party

== Election results ==
=== 1952 ===
1952 Madras State Legislative Assembly election: Kandukur
Party	Candidate	Votes	%	±%
INC	Nalamothu Chenchurama Naidu	20,101	17.40%	17.40%
Independent	Chukka Kotilingam	16,922	14.65%	
Independent	Guntapalli Venkatasubbiah	16,038	13.88%	
KMPP	Divi Kondiah Chowdary	15,740	13.62%	
RPI	B. Anandam	9,546	8.26%	
Independent	Ellamugu Sundara Rao	4,818	4.17%	
Independent	Bathineni Perumalla Naidu	4,495	3.89%	
Socialist Party (India)	Bathula Sankara Reddi	4,420	3.83%	
Independent	Nathulapati Ekasi	3,702	3.20%	
Margin of victory		337	0.29%	
Turnout		1,15,546	80.80%	
Registered electors		1,42,998		
INC win (new seat)				

=== 1955 ===
1955 Andhra State Legislative Assembly election: Kandukur
Party	Candidate	Votes	%	±%
INC	Divi Kondaiah Chowdary	21,506	57.42	
CPI	Ravi Pati Vankaiah	14,409	38.47	
Majority		7,097	18.95	
Turnout		37,453	62.05	
Registered electors		60,357		
INC hold		Swing		

=== 1962 ===
1962 Andhra Pradesh Legislative Assembly election: Kandukur
Party	Candidate	Votes	%	±%
INC	N. Chenchu Rama Naidu	23,905	50.55	
SWA	Divi Kondaiah Chowdary	22,233	47.02	
Majority		1,672	3.54	
Turnout		488,36	71.94	
Registered electors		67,880		
INC hold		Swing		

=== 1967 ===
1967 Andhra Pradesh Legislative Assembly election: Kandukur
Party	Candidate	Votes	%	±%
INC	N. Chenchu Rama Naidu	34,927	54.62	
SWA	V.Y.K.Reddy	29,015	45.38	
Majority		5,912	9.25	
Turnout		66,113	80.08	
Registered electors		82,561		
INC hold		Swing		

=== 1972 ===
1972 Andhra Pradesh Legislative Assembly election: Kandukur
Party	Candidate	Votes	%	±%
Independent	M. Audinarayana Reddy	36,892	54.05	
INC	N. Chenchu Rama Naidu	31,459	46.09	
Majority		5,433	7.96	
Turnout		70,060	74.33	
Registered electors		94,258		
Independent gain from INC		Swing		

=== 1978 ===
1978 Andhra Pradesh Legislative Assembly election: Kandukur
Party	Candidate	Votes	%	±%
INC(I)	Divi Kondaiah Chowdary	35,361	46.68	
JP	Audinarayana Reddy Manugunta	23,056	30.44	
Independent	Bataarusetty Kondaiah	9,571	12.64%	
INC	Angirekula Venkateswara Rao	5862	7.74%	
Majority		12,305	16.24	
Turnout		77,536	73.36	
Registered electors		105,692		
INC(I) gain from Independent		Swing		

=== 1983 ===
1983 Andhra Pradesh Legislative Assembly election: Kandukur
Party	Candidate	Votes	%	±%
Independent	Adinarayana Reddy Manugunta	29,134	37.29%	
TDP	Venkatasubbaiah Gutha	26,293	33.65%	
INC	Kondaiah Chowdary Divi	22,704	29.06%	
Majority		2,841	3.64	
Turnout		79,420	68.24	
Registered electors		116,376		
Independent gain from INC(I)		Swing		

=== 1985 ===
1985 Andhra Pradesh Legislative Assembly election: Kandukur
Party	Candidate	Votes	%	±%
INC	Audinarayana Reddy Manugunta	45,765	49.51	
TDP	Venkatasubbaiah Gutta	44,480	48.12	
Majority		1,285	1.39	
Turnout		93,670	72.74	
Registered electors		128,782		
INC gain from TDP		Swing		

=== 1989 ===
1989 Andhra Pradesh Legislative Assembly election: Kandukur
Party	Candidate	Votes	%	±%
INC	Manugunta Maheedhar Reddy	56,626	54.81	
TDP	Moruboyina Malakondaiah	46,428	44.94	
Majority		10,198	9.87	
Turnout		155,210	68.22	
Registered electors		155,210		
INC hold		Swing		

=== 1994 ===
1994 Andhra Pradesh Legislative Assembly election: Kandukur
Party	Candidate	Votes	%	±%
TDP	Divi Sivaram	52,376	48.54%	
Independent	Manugunta Maheedhar Reddy	46,351	42.95%	
INC	Bhattarusetty Kondaiah	5916	5.48	
BSP	Matle Venkatasubbaiah	2151	1.99	
Majority		6,025	5.58	
Turnout		109,427	73.60	
Registered electors		148,677		
TDP gain from INC		Swing		

=== 1999 ===
1999 Andhra Pradesh Legislative Assembly election: Kandukur
Party	Candidate	Votes	%	±%
TDP	Divi Sivaram	63,964	50.47%	
INC	Maheedhar Reddy	62,439	49.26%	
Majority		1,525	1.20	
Turnout		129,328	73.16	
Registered electors		176,773		
TDP hold		Swing		

=== 2004 ===
2004 Andhra Pradesh Legislative Assembly election: Kandukur
Party	Candidate	Votes	%	±%
INC	Manugunta Maheedhar Reddy	67,207	52.56	+3.30
TDP	Divi Sivaram	59,328	46.40	−4.07
Majority		7,879	6.16	
Turnout		127,896	83.38	+11.68
Registered electors		153,392		
INC gain from TDP		Swing		

=== 2009 ===
2009 Andhra Pradesh Legislative Assembly election: Kandukur
Party	Candidate	Votes	%	±%
INC	Manugunta Maheedhar Reddy	74,553	48.22	−4.34
TDP	Divi Sivaram	70,310	45.47	−0.93
PRP	Vallepu Raghavulu	5,885	3.81	
Majority		4,243	2.75	
Turnout		154,613	83.52	+0.16
Registered electors		185,120		
INC hold		Swing		

=== 2014 ===
2014 Andhra Pradesh Legislative Assembly election: Kandukur
Party	Candidate	Votes	%	±%
YSRCP	Pothula Ramarao	84,538	48.83	
TDP	Divi Sivaram	80,732	46.64	
BSP	Ekula Venkateswarlu	4572	2.64	
Majority		3,806	2.19	
Turnout		173,113	88.95	+15.43
Registered electors		194,679		
YSRCP gain from INC				

=== 2019 ===
2019 Andhra Pradesh Legislative Assembly election: Kandukur
Party	Candidate	Votes	%	±%
YSRCP	Manugunta Maheedhar Reddy	101,275	51.69%	
TDP	Pothula Ramarao	86339	44.07%	
JSP	Puli Mallikarjuna Rao	2322	1.19%	
Majority		14936	7.66	
Turnout		196,510	89.75	
Registered electors		218,961		
YSRCP hold		Swing		

=== 2024 ===
2024 Andhra Pradesh Legislative Assembly election: Kandukur
Party	Candidate	Votes	%	±%
TDP	Inturi Nageswara Rao	109,173	52.8	
YSRCP	Burra Madhusudhan yadav	90,615	43.82	
INC	Gouse Mohiddin Syed	2,300	1.11	
NOTA	None of the above	1,025	0.5	
Majority		18,558	8.98	
Turnout		2,06,773		
TDP gain from YSRCP		Swing		

== See also ==
- List of constituencies of Andhra Pradesh Legislative Assembly
