= Jupudi Prabhakar Rao =

Indian politician

Jupudi Prabhakara Rao
- Born: 30-04-1965; Sankuvarigunta, Kothapatnam Mandal, Prakasam District.
- Office: Government Advisor- Social Justice, Ex MLC, Ex Chairman, APSCCFC Ltd.
- Term: 2021-2023
- Political party: YSR Congress Party
- Children: 2

Jupudi Prabhakara Rao is an Indian politician chairman for Andhra Pradesh Scheduled Caste Co-Operative Finance Corporation Ltd and an Ex MLC in United Andhra Pradesh. He belongs to YSR Congress Party.

== Background ==
Jupudi Prabhakara Rao was born and raised in the urban village of Sankuvarigunta, Kothapatnam Mandal in Prakasam District.

== Political career ==
Jupudi Prabhakara Rao was offered an MLC (Member of Legislative Council) position by late Chief Minister Dr YS Rajasekhara Reddy. After YSR's death Jupudi Prabhakara Rao stood by Y S Jagan Mohan Reddy as he was left alone at that time and participated in his political activities. He was associated with YSR Congress Party floated by Y. S. Jagan Mohan Reddy. Later he resigned to YSR Congress Party on 10 August 2014 and joined TDP on 19 December 2014. Following the people mandate in 2019 Elections, he joined back YSR Congress Party in October 2019.

Jupudi Prabhakara Rao has served as an MLC ( Member of Legislative Council ). After the State bifurcation of United Andhra Pradesh, being his vote in Hyderabad, Telangana State, he lost his MLC in 2015. After that he was elected as Chairman for Andhra Pradesh Scheduled Caste Cooperative Finance Corporation in 2015 for a term of two years. Again extended his tenure for another two years in 2017. He is the first person to get appointed twice as chairman for APSCCFC.. He resigned as chairman, APSCCFC Ltd soon after the YSR Congress Party came to power in 2019. He joined the YSR Congress Party as part of the political equation that changed over a period of time. Andhra Pradesh Chief Minister Sri Y S Jagan Mohan Reddy has appointed Jupudi Prabhakara Rao as Government Advisor - Social Justice in August, 2021. YSR Congress Party Chief Sri Y S Jagan Mohan Reddy appointed Jupudi Prabhakara Rao as the President of the YSR Congress Party's state SC Cell on 19 July 2022.
