= Pothula Rama Rao =

Indian politician

Pothula Ramarao (born 1951) is an Indian politician from Andhra Pradesh. He was a former member of the Andhra Pradesh Legislative Assembly from Kandukur Assembly constituency in Prakasam district representing the YSR Congress Party.

== Early life ==
Ramarao is from Kondapi, Prakasam district, Andhra Pradesh. He is the son of the late Chenchaiah. He completed his bachelors degree in Agricultural Sciences in 1971 at the Agricultural College, Bapatla, which is affiliated with the AP Agriculture University. He runs his own business and declared assets worth Rs.47 crore in 2019, in his affidavit to the Election Commission of India.

== Career ==
Ramarao won the Kandukur Assembly constituency in the 2014 Andhra Pradesh Legislative Assembly election representing the YSR Congress Party. He polled 84,538 votes and defeated his nearest rival, Divi Siva Ram of the Telugu Desam Party, by a margin of 3,806 votes. In June 2016, he joined the Telugu Desam Party.
