= Prathipadu, Guntur district =

Prathipadu
- Village
- Interactive map of Prathipadu
- Location in Andhra Pradesh, India Prathipadu (India)
- Coordinates: 16°11′16″N 80°20′21″E
- Country: India
- State: Andhra Pradesh
- District: Guntur
- Mandal: Prathipadu

Area
  - Total: 22.55 km^{2} (8.71 sq mi)
- Elevation: 24 m (79 ft)

Population (2011)
  - Total: 14,305
  - Density: 634.4/km^{2} (1,643/sq mi)

Languages
  - Official: Telugu
- Time zone: UTC+5:30 (IST)
- PIN: 522019
- Telephone code: +91–863
- Vehicle registration: AP-07

Prathipadu is a village in Guntur district of the Indian state of Andhra Pradesh. It is located in Prathipadu mandal of Guntur revenue division. The village forms a part of Andhra Pradesh Capital Region and is under the jurisdiction of APCRDA.

== Education ==
As per the school information report for the academic year 2018–19, the village has a total of 4 Zilla/Mandal Parishad schools.
