= Kondepadu, Guntar district =

Kondepadu
- Village
- Interactive map of Kondepadu
- Kondepadu in India Kondepadu (India)
- Coordinates: 16.201776°N 80.37215°E
- Country: India
- State: Andhra Pradesh
- District: Guntur

Population
  - Total: 2,000

Kondepadu is a medium-sized village with a population of around 2500, located in the Guntur district of Andhra Pradesh, India.
