= Prathipadu, Guntur Assembly constituency =

Constituency of the Andhra Pradesh Legislative Assembly, India

Coordinates: 16.18°N 80.34°E

Prathipadu
- Constituency No. 93 for the Andhra Pradesh Legislative Assembly
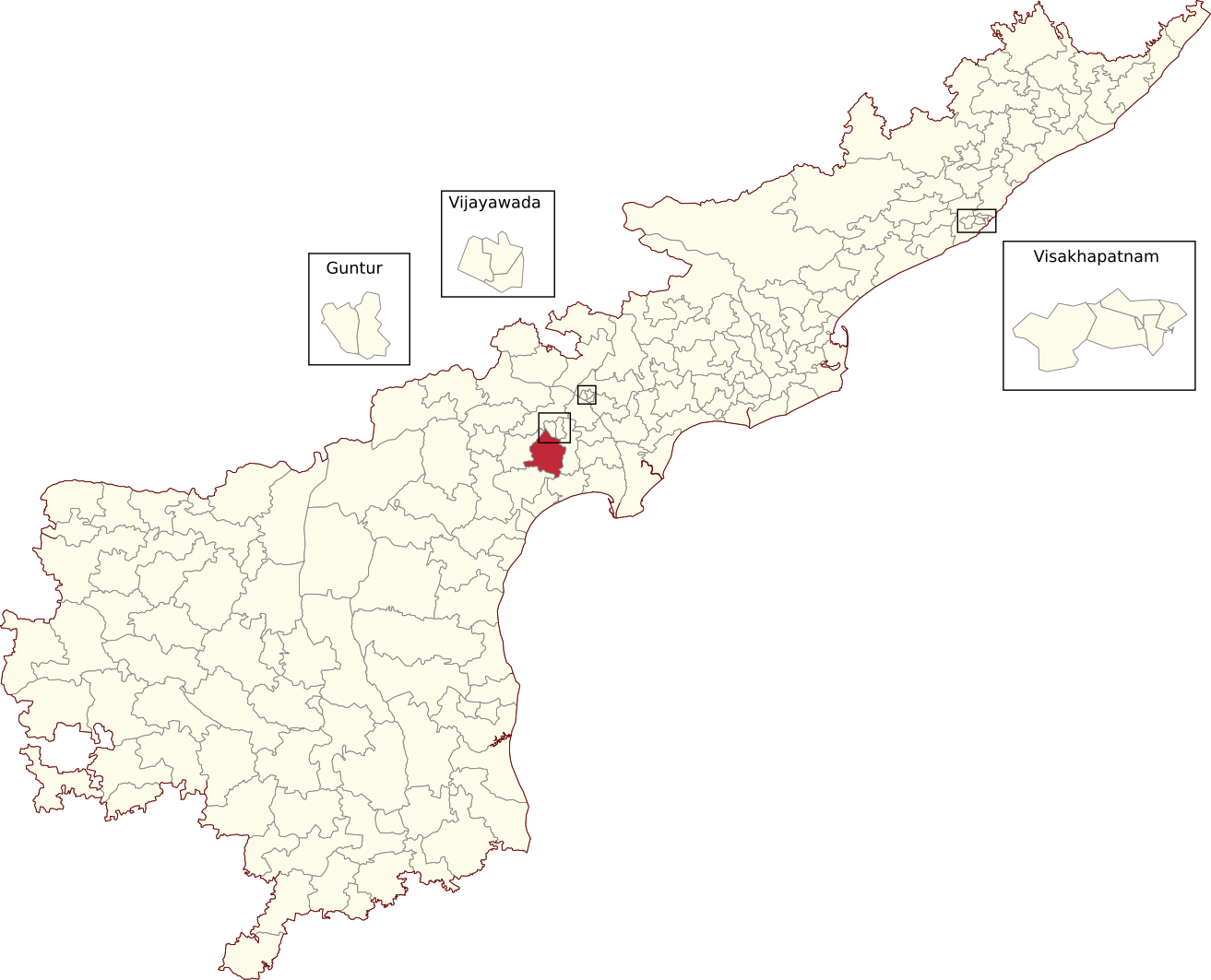
- Location of Prathipadu Assembly constituency within Andhra Pradesh

Constituency details
- Country: India
- Region: South India
- State: Andhra Pradesh
- District: Guntur
- Lok Sabha constituency: Guntur
- Established: 1951
- Total electors: 267888
- Reservation: SC

Member of Legislative Assembly
- 16th Andhra Pradesh Legislative Assembly
- Incumbent Burla Ramanjaneyulu
- Party: TDP
- Alliance: NDA
- Elected year: 2024

Prathipadu Assembly constituency is a Scheduled Caste reserved constituency in Guntur district of Andhra Pradesh that elects representatives to the Andhra Pradesh Legislative Assembly in India. It is one of the seven assembly segments of Guntur Lok Sabha constituency.

Burla Ramanjaneyulu is the current MLA of the constituency, having won the 2024 Andhra Pradesh Legislative Assembly election from Telugu Desam Party. As of 2019, there are a total of 250,247 electors in the constituency. The constituency was established in 1951, as per the Delimitation Orders (1951).

== History ==
In the Prathipadu assembly constituency, several political parties have competed for representation over the years. The Indian National Congress (INC) has been a prominent contender, securing victory in 5 elections held in 1952, 1972, 1978, 2004, and 2009. Following closely behind, the Telugu Desam Party (TDP) has demonstrated significant electoral success, winning seats in 7 elections conducted in 1983, 1985, 1989, 1994, 1999,2014 and 2024. Additionally, other parties such as the YSR Congress Party (YSRCP), Krishikar Lok Party (KLP), Communist Party of India (CPI), and Swatantra Party have also made notable contributions to the political landscape of the constituency.

According to the orders of the Delimitation Commission in 1955, the Assembly Constituency was named Pedda Kakani and included Prathipadu firka and Peddakakani firka (excluding Koppuravur, Venigandla, Nambur, Kantamraj-Kondur, Penumuli, and Devarayabhotlapalem villages) in Guntur taluk.

In the 1967 delimitation order, the Prathipadu Assembly Constituency was established, comprising Prathipadu firka in Guntur taluk, Nadendla firka, and six villages in Narasaraopet firka in Narasaraopet taluk. The six villages from Narasaraopet firka are:

- Dondapadu
- Kondakavur
- Ellamanda
- Kesanipalle
- Pothavarappadu
- Jonnalagadda.

In the 1976 delimitation of parliamentary and assembly constituencies, the Prathipadu Assembly Constituency was formed with Prathipadu firka and Pedakakani firka (excluding the villages of Kopparavur, Venigandla, Pedakakani, Nambur, Kantamraju-Kondur, Penumuli, and Devarayabhotlapalem) in Guntur taluk. The latest delimitation was done in 2008.

== Mandals ==
It was formed with five mandals of Guntur district in 2009.

Mandal
Guntur Mandal (except M.Corp.)
Vatticherukuru
Prathipadu
Pedanandipadu
Kakumanu

== Members of the Legislative Assembly ==
Year	Member	Political party
1952	Tamma Kotamma Reddy	Indian National Congress
1967	M. C. Nagaiah	Swatantra Party
1972	Peter Paul Chukka	Indian National Congress
1978	Karumuru Lakshminarayanareddy	Indian National Congress (I)
1983	Makineni Peda Rathaiah	Telugu Desam Party
1985	Makineni Peda Rathaiah	Telugu Desam Party
1989	Makineni Peda Rathaiah	Telugu Desam Party
1994	Makineni Peda Rathaiah	Telugu Desam Party
1999	Makineni Peda Rathaiah	Telugu Desam Party
2004	Raavi Venkata Ramana	Indian National Congress
2009	Mekathoti Sucharitha	Indian National Congress
2012	Mekathoti Sucharitha	YSR Congress Party
2014	Ravela Kishore Babu	Telugu Desam Party
2019	Mekathoti Sucharitha	YSR Congress Party
2024	Burla Ramanjaneyulu	Telugu Desam Party

== Election results ==
=== 2024 ===
2024 Andhra Pradesh Legislative Assembly election: Prathipadu
Party	Candidate	Votes	%	±%
TDP	Burla Ramanjaneyulu	128,665	58.09	▲17.63
YSRCP	Balasani Kiran Kumar	86,650	39.12	▼4.86
INC	Korivi Vinaya Kumar	3,491	1.58	
NOTA	None Of The Above	1,389	0.63	
Majority		42,015	18.97	▲15.45
Turnout		2,21,479	83.72	▼0.21
TDP hold		Swing		

=== 2019 ===
2019 Andhra Pradesh Legislative Assembly election: Prathipadu
Party	Candidate	Votes	%	±%
YSRCP	Mekathoti Sucharitha	92,508	43.98%	−2.04
TDP	Dokka Manikya Vara Prasada Rao	85,110	40.46%	−9.64
JSP	Ravela Kishore Babu	26,371	12.54%	+12.54
Majority		7,398	3.52	
Turnout		2,10,342	83.93	
YSRCP gain from TDP		Swing		

=== 2014 ===
2014 Andhra Pradesh Legislative Assembly election: Prathipadu
Party	Candidate	Votes	%	±%
TDP	Ravela Kishore Babu	96,274	50.10	+10.61
YSRCP	Mekathoti Sucharitha	88,869	46.02	−2.82
Majority		7,405	3.90	
Turnout		193,101	85.46	+4.13
TDP gain from INC		Swing		

=== 2012 By-Election ===
2012 Andhra Pradesh by-elections: Prathipadu
Party	Candidate	Votes	%	±%
YSRCP	Mekathoti Sucharitha	87,742	48.83	+9.51
TDP	Kandukuri Veeraiah	70,961	39.49	1.38
Majority		16,781	9.34	
Turnout		1,79,662		
YSRCP gain from INC		Swing		

=== 2009 ===
2009 Andhra Pradesh Legislative Assembly election: Prathipadu
Party	Candidate	Votes	%	±%
INC	Mekathoti Sucharitha	66,324	39.32	−12.39
TDP	Kandukuri Veeraiah	64,282	38.11	−8.74
PRP	Korivi Vinay Kumar	33,889	20.09	+20.09
Majority		2,042	1.21	
Turnout		168,669	81.33	+0.23
INC hold		Swing		

=== 2004 ===
2004 Andhra Pradesh Legislative Assembly election: Prathipadu
Party	Candidate	Votes	%	±%
INC	Ravi Venkata Ramana	52,403	51.71	+8.51
TDP	Makineni Peda Rattaiah	47,479	46.85	−8.70
Majority		4,925	4.86	
Turnout		101,366	81.10	+10.10
INC gain from TDP		Swing		

=== 1999 ===
1999 Andhra Pradesh Legislative Assembly election: Prathipadu
Party	Candidate	Votes	%	±%
TDP	Makineni Peda Rathaiah	52,038	55.55%	
INC	Rayapati Srinivas	40,468	43.20%	
Margin of victory		11,570	12.35%	
Turnout		95,087	72.06%	
Registered electors		131,951		
TDP hold		Swing		

=== 1994 ===
1994 Andhra Pradesh Legislative Assembly election: Prathipadu
Party	Candidate	Votes	%	±%
TDP	Makineni Peda Rathaiah	50,765	55.79%	
INC	Chebrolu Hanumaiah	37,786	41.53%	
Margin of victory		12,979	14.26%	
Turnout		92,299	73.81%	
Registered electors		125,053		
TDP hold		Swing		

=== 1989 ===
1989 Andhra Pradesh Legislative Assembly election: Prathipadu
Party	Candidate	Votes	%	±%
TDP	Makineni Peda Rathaiah	47,972	51.13%	
INC	Venkata Appa Rao Guntupalli	45,192	48.17%	
Margin of victory		2,780	2.96%	
Turnout		95,509	73.83%	
Registered electors		129,363		
TDP hold		Swing		

=== 1985 ===
1985 Andhra Pradesh Legislative Assembly election: Prathipadu
Party	Candidate	Votes	%	±%
TDP	Makineni Peda Rathaiah	42,004	55.40%	
INC	Peter Paul Chukka	31,214	41.17%	
Margin of victory		10,790	14.23%	
Turnout		76,921	70.80%	
Registered electors		108,651		
TDP hold		Swing		

=== 1983 ===
1983 Andhra Pradesh Legislative Assembly election: Prathipadu
Party	Candidate	Votes	%	±%
TDP	Makineni Peda Rathaiah	41,885	59.09%	
INC	Venkata Appa Rao Guntupalli	28,491	40.19%	
Margin of victory		13,394	18.90%	
Turnout		72,178	70.93%	
Registered electors		101,754		
TDP gain from INC(I)		Swing		

=== 1978 ===
1978 Andhra Pradesh Legislative Assembly election: Prathipadu
Party	Candidate	Votes	%	±%
INC(I)	Lakshmi Narayana Reddy Karumuru	27,961	39.07%	
JP	Sadasiva Rao K	26,703	37.31%	
Margin of victory		1,258	1.76%	
Turnout		73,089	74.90%	
Registered electors		97,584		
INC(I) gain from INC		Swing		

=== 1972 ===
1972 Andhra Pradesh Legislative Assembly election: Prathipadu
Party	Candidate	Votes	%	±%
INC	Peter Paul Chukka	37,402	57.15%	
SWA	Manne China Nagaiah	25,993	39.72%	
Margin of victory		11,409	17.43%	
Turnout		67,067	67.57%	
Registered electors		99,257		
INC gain from SWA		Swing		

=== 1967 ===
1967 Andhra Pradesh Legislative Assembly election: Prathipadu
Party	Candidate	Votes	%	±%
SWA	M.C. Nagaiah	26,361	44.40%	
Independent	E.C.R Reddy	23,723	39.96%	
Margin of victory		2,638	4.44%	
Turnout		63,715	74.39%	
Registered electors		85,653		
SWA gain from CPI		Swing		

=== 1952 ===
1952 Madras State Legislative Assembly election: Prathipadu
Party	Candidate	Votes	%	±%
INC	Tamma Kotamma Reddy	15,130	26.49%	
CPI	Managva Seshayya	14,274	24.99%	
Independent	Gingupalli Bapaiah	13,732	24.04%	
KLP	B. Venkatasivaiah	12,954	22.68%	
KMPP	Y. Ananda Rao	1,028	1.80%	
Margin of victory		856	1.50%	
Turnout		57,118	74.30%	
Registered electors		76,879		
INC win (new seat)				

== Peddakakani ==
1962 Andhra Pradesh Legislative Assembly election: Peddakakani
Party	Candidate	Votes	%	±%
CPI	PANGULURI KOTESWARARAO	17,392	35.53	
INC	GUNTUPALLI SURYANARAYANA	15,450	31.56	
Turnout		48,939	68.12%	
Registered electors		70,689		
CPI gain from KLP		Swing		

=== 1955 ===
1955 Andhra State Legislative Assembly election: Peddakakani
Party	Candidate	Votes	%	±%
KLP	GINJUPALLI BAPAYYA	25,865	55.51	
CPI	PANGULURI KOTESWARARAO	20,728	44.49	
Turnout		46,592	72.14%	
Registered electors		64,583		
KLP gain from INC		Swing		
