= Kondapi Assembly constituency =

Constituency of the Andhra Pradesh Legislative Assembly, India

Coordinates: 15.41°N 79.86°E

Kondapi
- Constituency No. 110 for the Andhra Pradesh Legislative Assembly
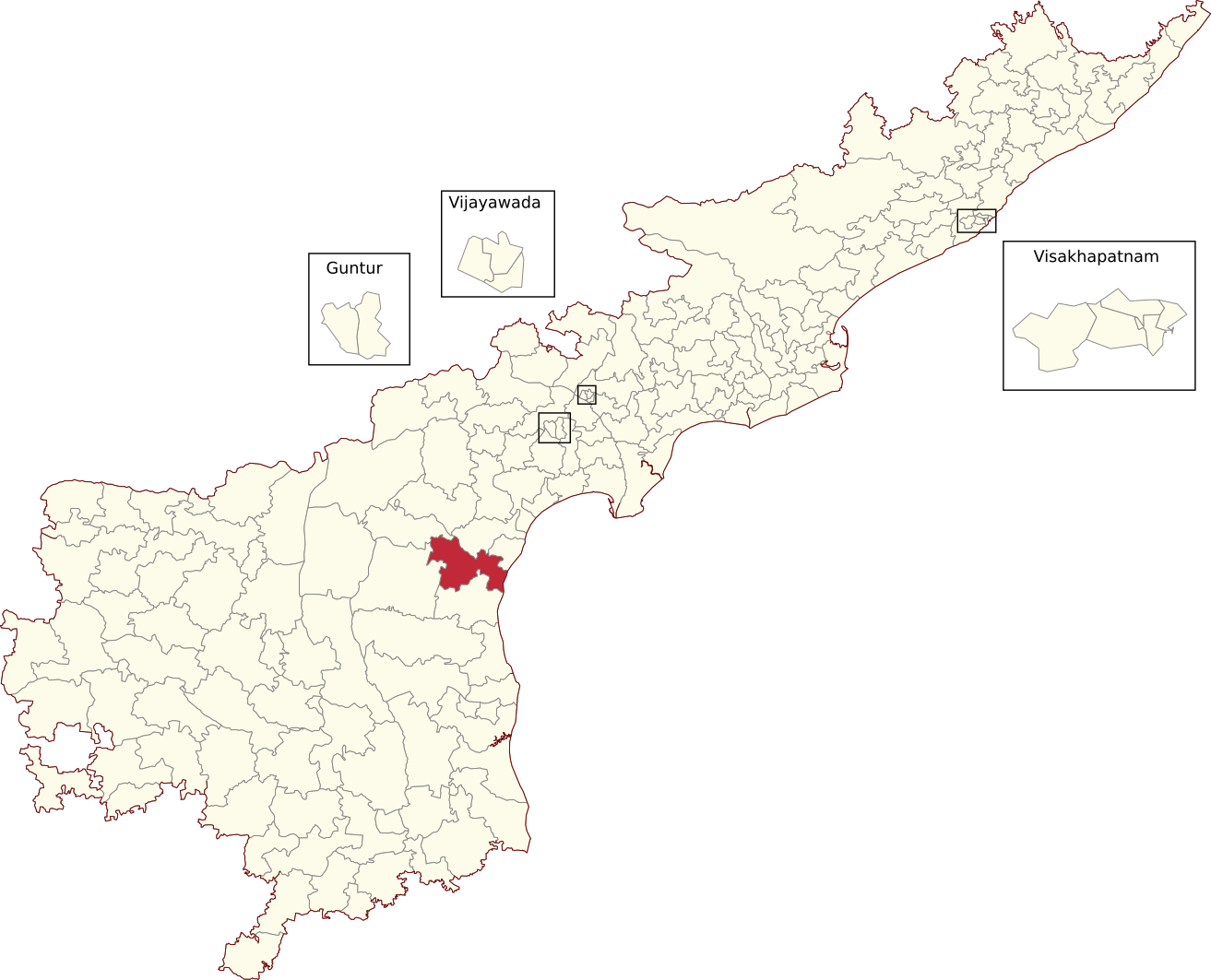
- Location of Kondapi Assembly constituency within Andhra Pradesh

Constituency details
- Country: India
- Region: South India
- State: Andhra Pradesh
- District: Prakasam
- Lok Sabha constituency: Ongole
- Established: 1955
- Total electors: 231,547
- Reservation: SC

Member of Legislative Assembly
- 16th Andhra Pradesh Legislative Assembly
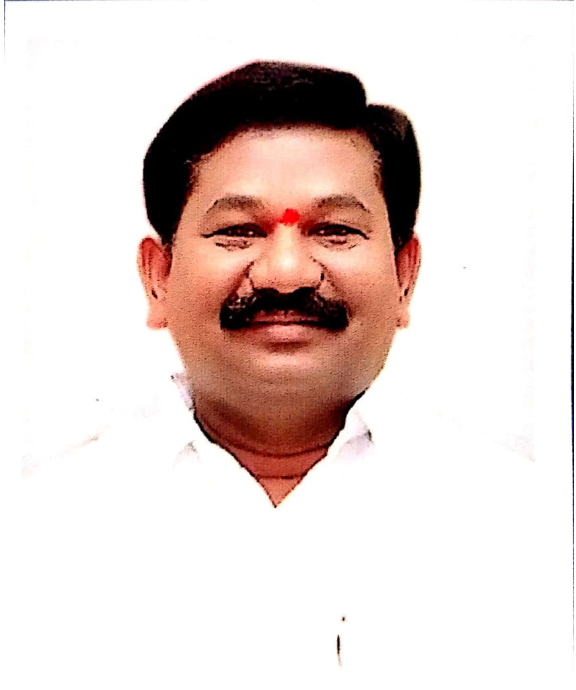
- Incumbent Dola Sree Bala Veeranjaneya Swamy
- Party: TDP
- Alliance: NDA
- Elected year: 2024

Kondapi Assembly constituency is a Scheduled Caste reserved constituency in Prakasam district of Andhra Pradesh that elects representatives to the Andhra Pradesh Legislative Assembly in India. It is one of the seven assembly segments of Ongole Lok Sabha constituency.

Dola Sree Bala Veeranjaneya Swamy is the current MLA of the constituency, having won the 2019 Andhra Pradesh Legislative Assembly election from Telugu Desam Party. As of 2019, there are a total of 231,547 electors in the constituency. The constituency was established in 1955, as per the Delimitation Orders (1955).

== Mandals ==
Mandal	Population (2011)
Singarayakonda	65,790
Kondapi	43,054
Tangutur	62,690
Zarugumilli	42,983
Ponnaluru	43,500
Marripudi	38,848

== Members of the Legislative Assembly ==
Year	Member	Political party
1955	Nallamothu Chenchuramana Naidu	Indian National Congress
1962	Changanti Rosaiah Naidu	Indian National Congress
1967	Changanti Rosaiah Naidu	Indian National Congress
1972	Divi Sankaraiah	Communist Party of India
1978	Gundapaneni Pattabhi Ramaswamy	Indian National Congress (I)
1983	Maruboina Mala Kondaiah	Telugu Desam Party
1985	Achyuth Kumar Gundapaneni	Indian National Congress
1989	Achyuth Kumar Gundapaneni	Indian National Congress
1994	Damacharla Anjaneyulu	Telugu Desam Party
1999	Damacharla Anjaneyulu	Telugu Desam Party
2004	Pothula Rama Rao	Indian National Congress
2009	Gurrala Venkata Seshu	Indian National Congress
2014	Dola Sree Bala Veeranjaneya Swamy	Telugu Desam Party
2019	Dola Sree Bala Veeranjaneya Swamy	Telugu Desam Party
2024	Dola Sree Bala Veeranjaneya Swamy	Telugu Desam Party

== Election results ==
=== 2024 ===
2024 Andhra Pradesh Legislative Assembly election: Kondapi
Party	Candidate	Votes	%	±%
TDP	Dola Sree Bala Veeranjaneya Swamy	116,674	54.53	
YSRCP	Audimulapu Suresh	91,918	42.96	
INC	Pasumarthi Sudhakara Rao	1,666	0.78	
NOTA	None Of The Above	1,612	0.75	
Majority		24,756	11.57	
Turnout		2,13,944		
TDP hold		Swing		

=== 2019 ===
2019 Andhra Pradesh Legislative Assembly election: Kondapi
Party	Candidate	Votes	%	±%
TDP	Dola Sree Bala Veeranjaneya Swamy	98,142	48.00	
YSRCP	Madasi Venkaiah	96718	47.00	
BSP	Kaki Veera Chandra Sekhara Prasad	2983	1.47	
Majority		1024	0.51	
Turnout		201678	87.09	+1.8%
TDP hold		Swing		

=== 2014 ===
2014 Andhra Pradesh Legislative Assembly election: Kondapi
Party	Candidate	Votes	%	±%
TDP	Dola Sree Bala Veeranjaneya Swamy	91,230	50.33	
YSRCP	Jupudi Prabhakara Rao	86,794	47.36	
Majority		5,440	2.97	
Turnout		183,225	85.31	+8.63
TDP gain from INC		Swing		

=== 2009 ===
2009 Andhra Pradesh Legislative Assembly election: Kondapi
Party	Candidate	Votes	%	±%
INC	Gurrala Venkata Seshu	72,075	46.56	−5.92
TDP	Dola Sree Bala Veeranjaneya Swamy	66,911	43.22	−2.00
PRP	Sujatha Gangada	9,196	5.94	
Majority		5,164	3.34	
Turnout		154,814	76.68	−6.38
INC hold		Swing		

=== 2004 ===
2004 Andhra Pradesh Legislative Assembly election: Kondapi
Party	Candidate	Votes	%	±%
INC	Pothula Rama Rao	64,074	52.48	+8.98
TDP	Damacharla Anjaneyulu	55,202	45.22	−7.65
Majority		8,872	7.26	
Turnout		187458	83.06	+13.58
INC gain from TDP		Swing		

=== 1999 ===
1999 Andhra Pradesh Legislative Assembly election: Kondapi
Party	Candidate	Votes	%	±%
TDP	Damacharla Anjaneyulu	71,824	52.87%	
INC	Pothula Rama Rao	50,872	43.50%	
Margin of victory		20,952	9.37%	
Turnout		129,725	70.72%	
Registered electors		169,302		
TDP hold		Swing		

=== 1994 ===
1994 Andhra Pradesh Legislative Assembly election: Kondapi
Party	Candidate	Votes	%	±%
TDP	[[Damacharla Anjaneyulu]	55,913	59.10%	
INC	Achyuthkumar Gundapaneni	34,958	36.95%	
Margin of victory		20,955	22.15%	
Turnout		96,470	69.72%	
Registered electors		138,371		
TDP gain from INC		Swing		

=== 1989 ===
1989 Andhra Pradesh Legislative Assembly election: Kondapi
Party	Candidate	Votes	%	±%
INC	Achyuthkumar Gundapaneni	47,350	51.50%	
CPI	Sankaraiah Divi	43,023	46.80%	
Margin of victory		4,327	4.71%	
Turnout		95,495	63.33%	
Registered electors		150,795		
INC hold		Swing		

=== 1985 ===
1985 Andhra Pradesh Legislative Assembly election: Kondapi
Party	Candidate	Votes	%	±%
INC	Achyuthkumar Gundapaneni	38,404	48.38%	
TDP	Maruboina Mala Kondaiah	37,133	46.78%	
Margin of victory		1,271	1.60%	
Turnout		80,501	64.87%	
Registered electors		124,091		
INC gain from TDP		Swing		

=== 1983 ===
1983 Andhra Pradesh Legislative Assembly election: Kondapi
Party	Candidate	Votes	%	±%
TDP	Maruboina Mala Kondaiah	50,394	70.64%	
INC	Thatiparthy Subba Reddy	20,546	28.80%	
Margin of victory		29,848	41.84%	
Turnout		72,619	63.03%	
Registered electors		115,208		
TDP gain from INC(I)		Swing		

=== 1978 ===
1978 Andhra Pradesh Legislative Assembly election: Kondapi
Party	Candidate	Votes	%	±%
INC(I)	Gundapaneni Pattabhi Ramaswamy	37,785	51.18%	
JP	Chaganti Rosaiah Naidu	19,494	26.40%	
Margin of victory		18,291	24.78%	
Turnout		75,601	71.92%	
Registered electors		105,118		
INC(I) gain from CPI		Swing		

=== 1972 ===
1972 Andhra Pradesh Legislative Assembly election: Kondapi
Party	Candidate	Votes	%	±%
CPI	Divi Sankaraiah	21,020	41.36%	
Independent	Divi Kondaiah Chowdary	20,790	40.90%	
Margin of victory		230	0.45%	
Turnout		51,907	58.00%	
Registered electors		89,495		
CPI gain from INC		Swing		

=== 1967 ===
1967 Andhra Pradesh Legislative Assembly election: Kondapi
Party	Candidate	Votes	%	±%
INC	Chaganti Rosaiah Naidu	25,218	48.83%	
CPI	G.Y.Reddy	23,970	46.41%	
Margin of victory		1,248	2.42%	
Turnout		54,586	65.35%	
Registered electors		82,274		
INC hold		Swing		

=== 1962 ===
1962 Andhra Pradesh Legislative Assembly election: Kondapi
Party	Candidate	Votes	%	±%
INC	Chaganti Rosaiah Naidu	22,682	55.52%	
CPI	Ravi Chenchaiah	14,977	36.66%	
Margin of victory		7,705	18.86%	
Turnout		42,777	67.31%	
Registered electors		63,548		
INC hold		Swing		

=== 1955 ===
1955 Andhra State Legislative Assembly election: Kondapi
Party	Candidate	Votes	%	±%
INC	Nallamothu Chenchuramana Naidu	21,078	55.84%	
CPI	Guntupalli Venkata Subbaiah	16,671	44.16%	
Margin of victory		4,407	11.67%	
Turnout		37,749	68.18%	
Registered electors		55,364		
INC win (new seat)				

== See also ==
- List of constituencies of Andhra Pradesh Legislative Assembly
