= Tangutur =

Tangutur Tanguturu
- Village
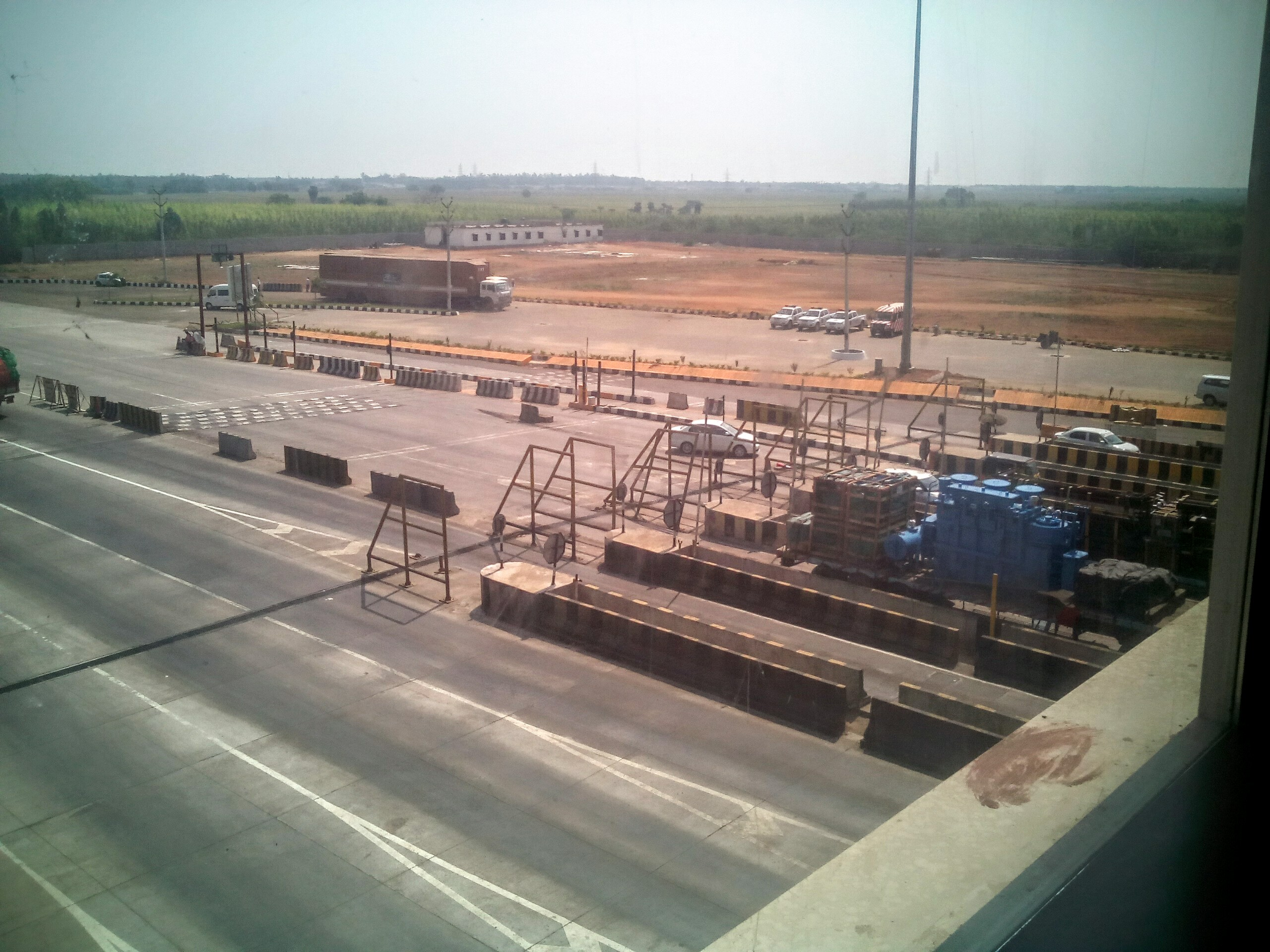
- Tollgate on National Highway 16 at Tangutur, Prakasam district
- Interactive map of Tangutur
- Location in Andhra Pradesh, India Tangutur (India)
- Coordinates: 15.35°N 80.05°E
- Country: India
- State: Andhra Pradesh
- District: Prakasam
- Talukas: Tangutur

Population
  - Total: 27,652

Languages
  - Official: Telugu
- Time zone: UTC+5:30 (IST)
- PIN: 523274
- Telephone code: 08592
- Vehicle registration: AP

Tangutur is a village and mandal headquarters in the Prakasam district of Andhra Pradesh, India. It is part of the Ongole revenue division. Nearby towns include Singarayakonda, Kandukur, Kondapi. The nearest city is Ongole.

== Geography ==
Tangutur is located at the geographical coordinates 15°20'26"N 80°2'4"E. The town has an average elevation of 36 feet (11 meters) above sea level. It covers a total area of 3,760 hectares (9,300 acres).

== Demographics ==
According to the 2011 Census of India, Tangutur had a total of 7,200 families and a population of 27,652, consisting of 13,674 males and 13,978 females. The town's literacy rate was 68.68%, surpassing the state average of 67.02% in Andhra Pradesh. The male literacy rate in Tangutur was 77.28%, while the female person literacy rate was 60.34%.

== See also ==
- Ongole
- Singarayakonda
- Kandukur, Prakasam district
