= Kondapi =

Kondapi Kondepi
- Village
- Interactive map of Kondapi
- Location in Andhra Pradesh, India Kondapi (India)
- Country: India
- State: Andhra Pradesh
- District: Prakasam
- Mandal: Kondapi

Languages
  - Official: Telugu
- Time zone: UTC+5:30 (IST)
- PIN: 523270
- Telephone code: 08598
- Vehicle registration: AP

Kondapi is a village in Prakasam district of the Indian state of Andhra Pradesh. It is the mandal headquarters of Kondapi mandal in Kandukur revenue division.

== Assembly constituency ==
Kondapi is an assembly constituency in Andhra Pradesh. There are 2,01,898 registered voters in Kondepi constituency according to statistics in 2009 elections. DSBV Swamy of TDP is the present MLA.

== Population of Kondepi ==
Kondapi is a large village located in Kondapi of Prakasam district, Andhra Pradesh with total 1235 families residing. The Kondapi village has population of 4928 of which 2485 are males while 2443 are females as per Population Census 2011.

In Kondapi village population of children with age 0-6 is 486 which makes up 9.86% of total population of village. Average Sex Ratio of Kondapi village is 983 which is lower than Andhra Pradesh state average of 993. Child Sex Ratio for the Kondapi as per census is 976, higher than Andhra Pradesh average of 939.

Kondapi village has higher literacy rate compared to Andhra Pradesh. In 2011, literacy rate of Kondapi village was 68.89% compared to 67.02% of Andhra Pradesh. In Kondapi Male literacy stands at 76.69% while female literacy rate was 60.96%.

As per constitution of India and Panchyati Raaj Act, Kondapi village is administrated by Sarpanch (Head of Village) who is elected representative of village.
