= Education in Amaravati =

Aspect of culture in Amaravati, India

Education in Amaravati includes primary, secondary and higher education institutions in Amaravati, Andhra Pradesh, India. Under the master plan, educational institutions in Amaravati are located in designated zones.

== Background and planning ==
Civic, economic, and academic functions have designated zones specified (S2) for the purpose under the master plan of Amaravati by Andhra Pradesh Capital Region Development Authority. "Knowledge City", is part of the master plan which intends to serve as the central hub for higher education, vocational training, and research institutes. Under this framework, government institutions, universities and private educational trusts were allocated land for establishing the campuses in the S2 zone.

== Higher education ==
There are various INIs, private and government institutions for schooling and higher education in Amaravati.

=== Institutes of National Importance ===
Established	Institution	Location	Status
2015	All India Institite of Medical Sciences	Mangalagiri	Institute of National Importance
2015	National Institute of Design, Andhra Pradesh	Sakhamuru, LPS-19	Institute of National Importance

In October 2015, All India Institite of Medical Sciences, Mangalagiri, was established under Pradhan Mantri Swasthya Suraksha Yojana (PMSSY). It is an Institite of National Importance. The campus is about 183-acres in area.

In 2015, National Institute of Design, Andhra Pradesh, was established. The campus is about 50-acres in area, it is located in Sakhamuru, LPS-19, Amaravati.

=== Universities ===
Established	Institution	Location	Type
2017	SRM University, AP	Neerukonda, LPS-05	Private university
2017	VIT-AP University	Inavolu, LPS-13	Private university
2018	Amrita Vishwa Vidyapeetham	Kuragallu, LPS-04	Deemed-to-be university

In 2017, SRM University, AP, was established, it is a private university located in Neerukonda.

In 2017, VIT-AP University, was established, it is a private university established in 2017 in Inavolu.

In 2018, Amrita Vishwa Vidyapeetham, Amaravati, was established, it is a deemed-to-be university. Its Amaravati campus offers engineering, management, and science programs.

=== Planned institutions ===
Institution	Location	Development status
BITS Pilani	Mandadam and Venkatapalem, LPS-03,24	Under construction
XLRI – Xavier School of Management Amaravati	Inavolu, LPS-13	Under construction
Aditya Educational Society	Nidamarru, LPS-6	Planned
National Electronics and Information Technology Institute (NIELIT)	Amaravati	Planned

== Quantum Valley and advanced technology education ==
There are plans for making Amaravati as the center of quantum technology and technology education through the Amaravati Quantum Valley initiative. The Government of Andhra Pradesh has mentioned that the initiative is one of their efforts of creating the quantum technology ecosystem in the capital city and the National Quantum Mission will act as the framework for research and development at the national level. The cornerstone of the Amaravati Quantum Centre has been laid in February 2026.

Talent development and education are other components of the initiative. On 4th February 2026, there was an agreement between NIELIT and the Government of Andhra Pradesh for setting up a Quantum and Artificial Intelligence University Campus in Amaravati. This planned campus aims at offering higher education, research, development of technologies, skills, innovations, and entrepreneurship in the domain of quantum computing, artificial intelligence, quantum communication and security, semiconductor technology, and other related areas.

There have been other collaborations between the government of Andhra Pradesh and already established institutions within the higher education system, under the auspices of the Quantum Valley project. SRM University, Andhra Pradesh entered into an agreement with the government of Andhra Pradesh for the development of a Quantum Reference Facility and has become a partner in the project.

The Government of Andhra Pradesh gave clearance for the NIELIT Quantum and AI University campus in the month of August 2026. This university campus project has been estimated to be built on a land area of 8.5 acres within five years by making an investment of ₹730.7 crore. The university will provide undergraduate, postgraduate, doctoral, diploma, and executive courses. The main campus is planned to have facilities for doing research and teaching in the subjects of quantum computing and communication, quantum photonics, quantum security, semiconductors, high-performance computing, and other similar fields.

Quantum Valley thus becomes one component in the larger picture of Amaravati as a center for education and research through associations between university education and training programs with research facilities sponsored by the government, and technology development. The Andhra Pradesh Capital Region Development Authority’s list of projects includes a 50-acre Quantum Valley project located in Uddandarayunipalem and Lingayapalem.

== School education ==
Mary Matha English Medium High School and D.A.V. Amaravati Rythu Vidyalaya, Thullur are the private schools located in Amaravati, both the schools are affiliated to Central Board of Secondary Education.

== See also ==
- Education in Andhra Pradesh
- List of institutions of higher education in Andhra Pradesh
