= Transport in Amaravati =

Overview
- Locale: Amaravati, Andhra Pradesh
- Transit type: Bus, private automobile, rail (proposed), metro (proposed), inland waterway transport (proposed)

Transport in Amaravati is supported by road, bus and air infrastructure serving Amaravati, Andhra Pradesh, India.

Metro, railways and inland waterways are proposed to support the internal network of Amaravati.

== Road ==
Road network in Amravati is grid-iron designed road network divided into East–West (E-Roads) and North–South (N-Roads) arterial corridors.

=== Grid Network Classification and Design Standards ===
Grid Network Classification and Design Standards
Road Level / Axis	Nomenclature	Right of Way (ROW)	Lanes	Key Function
Expressways / Major Arterials	E3, E5, E13, N6, N13	60 m (~200 ft)	8 Lanes + Bus Rapid Transit (BRT)	Inter-city connectivity, IRR/NH-16 links
Arterial / Sub-Arterial Corridors	E1–E2, E4, E6–E12, E14–E16, N1–N5, N7–N12, N14–N18	50 m (~165 ft)	6 Lanes	Grid-sector circulation, district access
Collector / Internal Streets	Secondary / Sector Roads	25 m – 35 m (~80–115 ft)	2–4 Lanes	Local neighbourhood and commercial access

=== East–West Grid Corridors (E-Road Network) ===
East–West Grid Corridors (E-Road Network)
Road ID	Hierarchy	Right of Way (ROW)	Key Termini / Connectivity	Status
E1	Sub-Arterial	50 m	Lingayapalem to Borupalem (Northernmost riverfront corridor, 3.27 km)	Under-construction
E2	Sub-Arterial	50 m	Northern residential sector grid	Planned
E3 (Seed Access Road)	Major Expressway	60 m	Dondapadu to Kanakadurga Varadhi / NH-16 (21 km primary capital axis)	Operational
E4	Sub-Arterial	50 m	Government Complex and Civic Spine corridor	Planned
E5	Major Arterial	60 m	Inner Ring Road (IRR) to NH-16 connection	Planned
E6	Sub-Arterial	50 m	Central Sector and Mixed-Use Commercial Zone	Planned
E7	Sub-Arterial	50 m	Internal capital circulation and IRR connection	Planned
E8–E12	Sub-Arterial	50 m	Financial District, Knowledge City, and Sports Hub sectors	Planned
E13	Major Arterial	60 m	NH-16, State Highway (SH), and IRR southern link	Under-construction
E14–E16	Sub-Arterial	50 m	Southern capital boundary and agricultural belt buffers	Under-construction

=== North–South Grid Corridors (N-Road Network) ===
North–South Grid Corridors (N-Road Network)
Road ID	Hierarchy	Right of Way (ROW)	Key Termini / Connectivity	Status
N1	Sub-Arterial	50 m	Undavalli to Tadepalli (Easternmost transit corridor, 3.68 km)	Planned
N2–N5	Sub-Arterial	50 m	Eastern mixed-use, residential, and institutional hubs	Under-construction
N6	Major Arterial	60 m	NH-16 Bypass link across the capital core	Planned
N7–N9	Sub-Arterial	50 m	Government Core, Secretariat, High Court, and Assembly zones	Planned
N10	Sub-Arterial	50 m	Central business district (CBD) circulation and IRR link	Planned
N11–N12	Sub-Arterial	50 m	Health City and Higher Education campuses	Under-construction
N13	Major Arterial	60 m	NH-65 to Inner Ring Road (IRR) central connector	Under-construction
N14–N16	Sub-Arterial	50 m	Western Knowledge City, Electronic Hub, and Agro-tech zones	Planned
N17–N18	Sub-Arterial	50 m	Western capital perimeter and IRR interchange	Under-construction

=== Regional Ring Road Connections ===
Regional Ring Road Connections
Ring Infrastructure	Planned Length	Right of Way (ROW)	Primary Function	Status
Inner Ring Road (IRR)	97.5 km	60 m	Encircles capital core; directly intersects all E and N grid endpoints	Planned
Outer Ring Road (ORR)	186 km	150 m	Peripheral express bypass connecting regional districts	Under-construction

== Bus ==
Andhra Pradesh State Road Transport Corporation (APSRTC) operates the local bus services. Currently bus services run between Interim Secretariat, Velagapudi and Interim High court, Nelapadu which cover the villages in Amaravati. These bus services provide connectivity with Pandit Nehru Bus Station in Vijayawada and the NTR bus station in Guntur.

== Rail ==
The region is currently served by the Vijayawada Junction railway station and the Guntur Junction railway station, both operated by the South Coast Railway (SCoR). The Errupalem–Amaravati–Namburu railway line (57 km) is under construction (land acquisition phase).

== Metro ==
The Vijayawada Metro rail project is currently the only proposed metro rail project which is under planning stages in the Andhra Pradesh Capital Region.

== Water ==
The city is situated on the right bank of the Krishna River and is incorporated into the development of National Waterway 4 (NW-4). The 82 KM stretch between Muktyala to Vijayawada of the Krishna River is designated as Phase-1 of NW-4 by the Inland Waterways Authority of India (IWAI). Passenger and Ro-Ro (roll-on/roll-off) terminals at Amaravati, Vedadri, Durga Ghat, and Bhavani Island are proposed under this phase.

== Air ==
Vijayawada International Airport serves Amaravati. Amaravati International Airport is proposed to be set-up in Amaravati, it is currently planning stage.

== See also ==
- Amaravati
- Andhra Pradesh Capital Region Development Authority
- Transport in Andhra Pradesh
