= Seed Access Road, Amaravati =

Ongoing arterial flyover road project

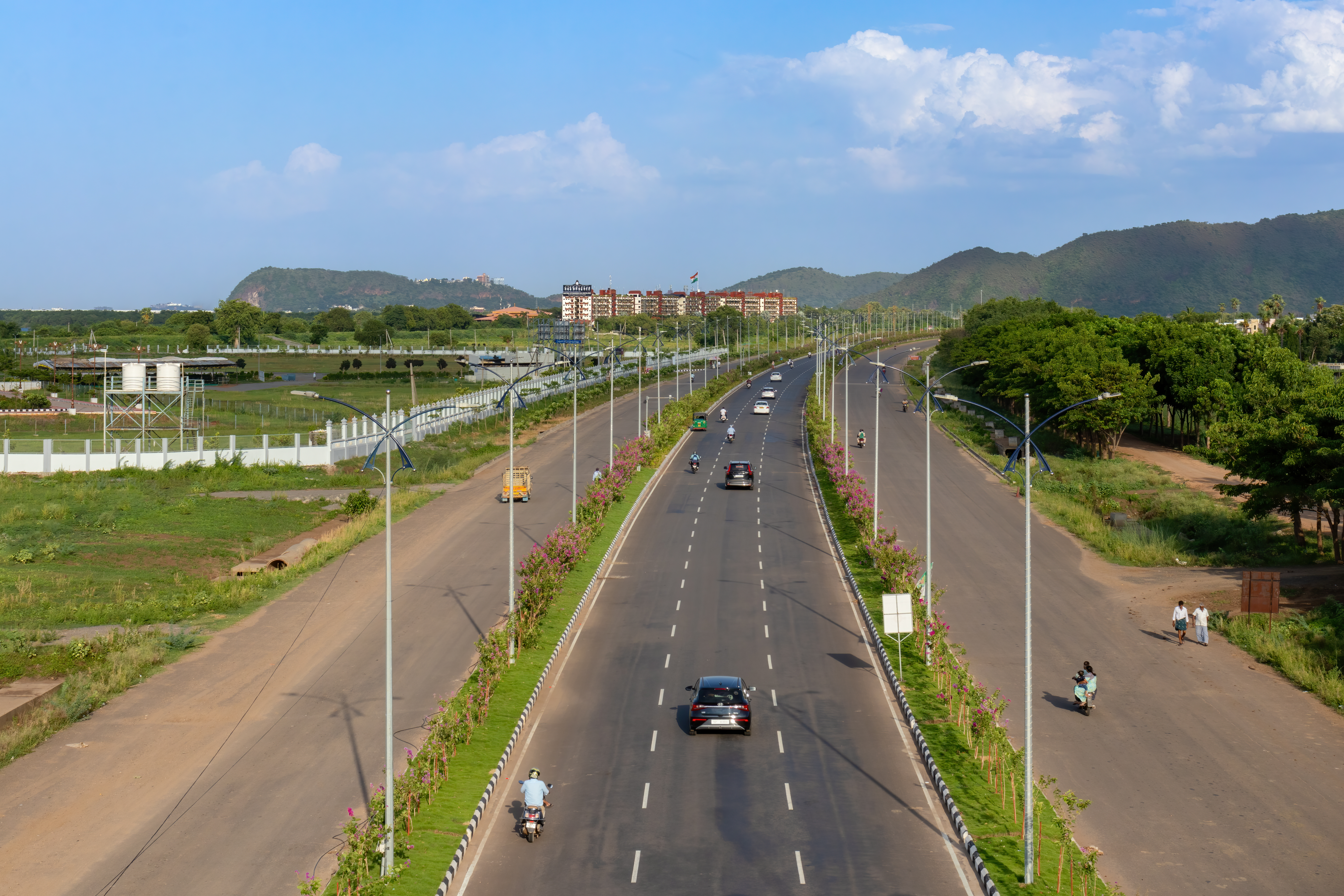

Route information
- Length: 21 km (13 mi)

Major junctions
- West end: Dondapadu
- East end: Kanakadurga Varadhi junction (National Highway 16)

Location
- Country: India

Highway system
- Roads in India; Expressways; National; State; Asian

The Seed Access Road, Amaravati (E3) is an under construction arterial flyover road project and a part of Amaravati Seed Access Road Network to connect the city of Vijayawada with Amaravati. It is built by the Andhra Pradesh Capital Region Development Authority (APCRDA) with an estimated cost of ₹15.19 billion (US$160 million) and has a total length of 21 km (13 mi).

== Construction ==
The phase–I was proposed to be constructed the road for a length of 18.3 km (11.4 mi) between Dondapadu and Venkatapalem by the end of 2018. It was completed by 2018, while the remaining segment from Venkatapalem to Undavalli faced delays due to opposition from some farmers and political leaders. The Government of Andhra Pradesh is planning to construct a 320 m (1,050 ft) long cable bridge as part of third phase of the project. This phase includes a 3.5 km (2.2 mi) stretch from Prakasam Barrage to Manipal Hospital, which will connect the Seed Access Road to National Highway 16 at Kanakadurga Varadhi. It has an estimated budget of ₹5.93 billion (US$62 million).

== See also ==
- Transport in Amaravati
