= Land Pooling in Amaravati =

Land acquisition exercise in Andhra Pradesh

Land pooling in Amaravati
- Other name: Amaravati Land Pooling Scheme (LPS)
- Location: Amaravati, Andhra Pradesh, India
- Status: Ongoing

Technical details
- Size: 34,568.8 acres (13,989.5 ha) pooled in Phase I, as of February 2025
- Proposed: 2014

Land Pooling in Amaravati, commonly referred to as the Amaravati Land Pooling Scheme (LPS), is a land pooling exercise done by the Government of Andhra Pradesh to acquire land required for the construction of Amaravati, the planned greenfield capital city of Andhra Pradesh. The LPS was created under the Andhra Pradesh Capital Region Development Authority Act, 2014. The phase-1 of the Land Pooling Scheme involved 29 settlements in Guntur district from which about 33,000 acres of land was pooled in exchange for developed plots.

== Background ==
After the bifurcation of Andhra Pradesh in 2014 under the Andhra Pradesh Reorganisation Act, 2014, Hyderabad was declared as the shared capital of Andhra Pradesh and Telangana for 10 years. The Government of Andhra Pradesh decided to establish capital at Amaravati. Under the Andhra Pradesh Capital Region Development Authority Act, 2014, the government has initiated Land Pooling Scheme (LPS).

== Scheme ==
Under the LPS scheme, landowners gave the land to APCRDA in return for commercial and residential plots with annual financial compensation (annuity) for a period of 10 years. The criteria is as follows:

Land classification	Reconstituted residential plot	Reconstituted commercial plot	Base annuity payment	Annuity terms
Dry land	1,000 square yards (840 m^{2})	250 square yards (210 m^{2})	₹30,000 / year	Increased by ₹3,000 annually for 10 years
Jareebu land	1,000 square yards (840 m^{2})	450 square yards (380 m^{2})	₹50,000 / year	Increased by ₹5,000 annually for 10 years

=== Benefits ===
- Annuity duration: Initially fixed to be given for 10 years, in 2024, the state government extended the annuity payment period to 15 years.
- Agricultural labour support: Landless agricultural labourers in Amaravati were given monthly pension of ₹2,500 per family for ten years. In February 2024, the pension was increased to ₹5,000 per month extended to 15 years.
- Loan waiver and social benefits: Farmers were given crop loan waivers up to ₹1.5 lakh per family along with subsidised education for their children and skill-training programs.

== Phase-II ==
Currently, the Government of Andhra Pradesh initiated process for the phase-II of Land Pooling Scheme.

== See also ==
- Amaravati Government Complex
- Amaravati International Airport
- Amaravati Quantum Valley
- Transport in Amaravati
