= Kanakadurga Flyover =

Flyover in Vijayawada, India

Kanakadurga Flyover కనకదుర్గ వారధి
- Coordinates: 16°30′46″N 80°36′14″E
- Carries: 6 lanes of road
- Crosses: Krishna River, Prakasam Barrage
- Locale: Vijayawada
- Other name(s): Durga Temple Flyover

Characteristics
- Design: Beam bridge
- Total length: 2.6 kilometres (1.6 mi)
- Width: 23.7 metres (78 ft)
- No. of spans: 47

History
- Construction start: 22 November 2015
- Construction end: 30 August 2020
- Construction cost: ₹458 Crores
- Opened: 30 September 2020

The Kanakadurga Flyover (also known as Durga Temple Flyover) is a flyover spanning the Krishna River and Prakasam Barrage in Vijayawada, India. As of 2022, it is the longest flyover in Andhra Pradesh with a length of 2.6 kilometres (1.6 mi). It was opened on 16 October 2020 by Nitin Gadkari.

== Geography ==
The Kanakadurga Flyover is built around Indrakeeladri Hill on which Kanaka Durga Temple is located. It spans from Bhavanipuram near Gollapudi to PNBS. Road widening works have been completed up to Kanaka Durga Varadhi. This project has a total length of 5.29 kilometres (3.29 mi), of which 2.3 kilometres (1.4 mi) are flyover and the remaining 2.9 kilometres (1.8 mi) are road widening works. This flyover crosses Krishna River, Prakasam Barrage and Buckingham Canal near Indrakeeladri hill, and meets NH65 near PNBS.

== History ==
After bifurcation, a flyover was proposed by the government of Andhra Pradesh to control traffic flow between the new state capital Amaravati and the de facto capital Hyderabad on the existing 15-20 foot highway around Durga temple. The construction of the Kanakadurga Flyover was started by Soma Company of Hyderabad on 22 November 2015 and the road level bridge was completed by 2016 for Krishna Pushkaralu. The flyover was very difficult to construct due to its plan and on the River Krishna. The land acquisition for this project cost around 100 crores for the shifting of utilities like drinking water pipelines along the road. The construction deadline was extended repeatedly between 2017 and 2020, and construction was finally completed by 30 August 2020.

== Construction ==
It is a six-lane highway with a width of 23.7 metres. It is the third of its kind in India to use pre-stress technology. It is estimated to have cost 282.4 crores, which was later adjusted to 440 crores for inflation. It has a unique and complex design with a six-lane corridor supported by a single pillar. There are two underpasses in the flyover master plan. Vertical gardening has been done on the column of this flyover along with a park for F1H2o to celebrate the 2018 F1H2o World Championship in Amaravati. The district administration has decided to allow traffic through the flyover prior to its completion to prevent traffic bottlenecks and congestion.

== See also ==
- Kanaka Durga Varadhi
- APCRDA
- Benz Circle Flyover
