= Andhra Pradesh Legislative Assembly building =

State legislative complex in India

- Interactive map of the Andhra Pradesh Legislative Assembly building area

General information
- Status: Under construction
- Type: Legislative building
- Location: Amaravati, Andhra Pradesh, India
- Coordinates: 16.5123°N 80.5155°E
- Groundbreaking: 2 May 2025
- Estimated completion: 2028
- Owner: AP Capital Region Development Authority (APCRDA)

Design and construction
- Architecture firm: Foster + Partners
- Main contractor: Larsen & Toubro

The Andhra Pradesh Legislative Assembly building is a legislative complex under construction located in Amaravati, the planned capital city of the Indian state of Andhra Pradesh. It is designed to serve as the home of the Andhra Pradesh Legislative Assembly.

== Background ==
Following the bifurcation of Andhra Pradesh in 2014 and the creation of the new state of Telangana, a new capital was needed. Amaravati was chosen due to its central location and strategic potential. A master plan for the new capital was developed, with the new Assembly complex envisioned as its centerpiece.

== Design and architecture ==
The building was designed by the internationally renowned architecture firm Foster and Partners, in collaboration with Indian firms. The structure draws symbolic and architectural inspiration from the Kohinoor diamond.

=== Layout and structure ===
The layout adheres to principles of Vaastu Shastra, the ancient Indian science of architecture. The plan is square in shape with specific directional placements:

- Public Entrance: North
- Ministers’ Entrance: East
- Assembly Chamber: Southwest
- Council Hall: Northeast
- Administrative Offices: Northwest

At the center is a courtyard designed to function as a civic gathering space.

=== Conical tower ===
The project includes a 250-meter-high conical roof, intended to exceed the height of the Statue of Unity, making it one of the tallest governmental buildings in India. The tower includes two viewing galleries:

- First Gallery at 80 meters
- Second Gallery at 250 meters

The Assembly and Council Halls are designed with glass walls.

== Sustainability features ==
The building integrates several eco-friendly and sustainable features, including:

- Photovoltaic solar panels for renewable energy generation
- Natural lighting and ventilation to reduce energy consumption
- Green roofing systems and water conservation techniques

It is part of Amaravati’s larger green master plan, which includes a network of parks, water bodies, and tree-lined avenues forming a central green spine across the city.

== Current status ==
As of May 2025, the construction of the Andhra Pradesh Legislative Assembly building is undergoing. The 'Andhra Pradesh Capital Region Development Authority (APCRDA) awarded the construction contract to Larsen & Toubro (L&T), valued at ₹617 crore. The Letter of Award was presented to L&T’s Deputy General Manager on April 20, 2025.

Construction began on May 2, 2025, after a ceremonial relaunch by Prime Minister Narendra Modi, who inaugurated and laid the foundation for infrastructure projects worth over ₹58,000 crore across the state. The Assembly building is set to span 11.21 lakh square feet within Super Block E of the Government Complex, covering 103.76 acres. The structure will include a basement and three above-ground floors.

This construction marks the revival of the Amaravati capital project, which faced delays in previous years. The current state administration aims to complete the capital’s core infrastructure within three years.

== See also ==
- Amaravati Government Complex
