= Benz Circle Flyover =

- Coordinates: 16.5012°N 80.6575°E
- Carries: 4 lanes of road
- Crosses: NH 65; Benz Circle; NH 16
- Locale: Vijayawada

Characteristics
- Design: Beam bridge
- Total length: 2.28 kilometres (1.42 mi)
- Width: 30 metres (98 ft)
- No. of spans: 49

History
- Construction start: November 2016
- Construction end: February 2020
- Opening: 30 September 2020

Benz Circle Flyover is a flyover spanning the Benz Circle area in Vijayawada, India. The 2.3 kilometres (1.4 mi) long flyover is part of the expansion of National Highway 16 and National Highway 65. Planned as a two-phased project, the first phase was inaugurated on 16 October 2020 by Nitin Gadkari. The flyover is expected to be wholly completed by 2022.

== History ==
It was included in the road-widening project and the widening of Vijayawada-Machilipatnam Highway from Benz Circle towards the east. The first phase consisted of 1.1 kilometres (0.68 mi) of construction stretching from Skew Bridge Junction to Novotel Hotel; this was completed by February 2020 and opened for public use. Forty-three pillars were constructed in the first phase. The second phase of construction was started on 5 November 2020 and completed by 3 November 2021. The flyover was opened for public use on 6 November 2021.

== See also ==
- Kanaka Durga Varadhi
- Kanakadurga Flyover
