= Kurnool Feeder Road =

Road in Andhra Pradesh, India

Kurnool Feeder Expressway

Route information
- Length: 123.7 km (76.9 mi)

Major junctions
- North end: Amaravati Anantapur Expressway
- South end: Kurnool

Location
- Country: India
- State: Andhra Pradesh
- Major cities: Amaravathi, Kurnool

Highway system
- Roads in India; Expressways; National; State; Asian; State Highways in Andhra Pradesh

Kurnool Feeder Expressway is a proposed greenfield expressway road in the Indian state of Andhra Pradesh. It is being built by the National Highways Authority of India under Phase–VII of National Highways Development Project.

== The project ==
The cost of project is expected to be ₹7,293 crore (equivalent to ₹100 billion or US$1.2 billion in 2023). It would cut travel time between Amaravathi and Kurnool by 70 minutes. The expressway will be 4-lane wide with service roads. It was proposed that this road will be designed for a speed of 120 kmph with straight alignments, avoiding habitations and locations of archaeological and religious importance. Tunnels and viaducts are proposed to be constructed to avoid hilly terrains and valley sections. The expressway will carry all public amenities viz. under passes, service roads, provision for green belt, rest houses, petrol pumps, service centres, restaurants and four agricultural mandis for milk, potatoes, grains, fruits and vegetables etc.

== Route ==
The expressway would stretch for a length of 123.7 km (76.9 mi) and include 71.7 km (44.6 mi) of service road. It will be connected to Amaravati Anantapur Expressway from Kadapa.It will have a total length of 6 Major bridges, 1 Railway Over Bridges, 4 Interchanges, and 16 km Length of Tunnel.
