= Kondaveedu Stream =

River in India

Kondaveedu Stream (commonly known as Kondaveetivagu) is a 29.4 km (18.3 mi) long drain in Guntur district. It originates at Kondaveedu hills and drains in Krishna River near Undavalli.
