= National Highway 544D (India) =

National highway in India

National Highway 544D
- Map of the National Highway in red

Route information
- Length: 417 km (259 mi)

Major junctions
- South end: Ananthpur
- North end: Guntur

Location
- Country: India
- States: Andhra Pradesh

Highway system
- Roads in India; Expressways; National; State; Asian
← NH 44	→ NH 16

National Highway 544D, commonly called NH 544D, and sometimes Anantapur-Guntur National highway 544D, is a national highway in India. It is a spur road of National Highway 44. NH-544D traverses the state of Andhra Pradesh in India.

== History ==
=== Amaravati–Anantapur Expressway ===
Amaravati – Anantapur Expressway was a proposed greenfield expressway of length 598.78 km in Andhra Pradesh. It was mainly proposed to connect the cities of Rayalaseema to the other part of the state with an expressway.

This proposed expressway was to serve as a major expressway along with National Highway 16. It would have had two feeder expressways connected to Kurnool and Kadapa with a length of 123.7 km and 104.05 km. It was initially planned to go through the capital of the state, Amaravati but the plan was subsequently changed to connect at the junction of National Highway 16 at Chilakaluripet. The Government of Andhra Pradesh proposed to this expressway at the Chilakaluripet junction of National Highway 16 to which the Central government agreed thereby saving Rs 3,500 crore and also 741 hectares of land from acquiring. This also reduces the distance of about 47 km of road length. It was to be built by the National Highways Authority of India under Phase–VII of the National Highways Development Project.

The cost of the project was expected to be ₹27,635 crore (equivalent to ₹400 billion or US$4.7 billion in 2023). It would cut travel time between Amaravathi and Anantapur by 120 minutes. The expressway was to be six lanes wide with service roads. The road was designed for a speed of 120 mph with straight alignments, avoiding habitations and locations of archaeological and religious importance. Tunnels and viaducts were proposed to be constructed to avoid hilly terrains and valley sections.

It was to connect Chilakaluripet from Anantapur with two feeder expressways Kurnool Feeder and Kadapa Feeder intersecting with it. The spinal corridor takes off from NH-44 near Maruru in Ananthapuramu District and ends at Pedaparimi near Sakhamuru, thereby crossing the Vijayawada IRR near Tadikonda and ORR near Velavarthipadu. Few fragments of the proposed expressway pass through Nallamala Forest area. The expressway traverses across the districts of Ananthapuram, Kurnool, Kadapa, Prakasam and Guntur. 6-lane road starts from Yadavalli which forms a single straight stretch to the state capital. The expressway is proposed to be designed as a high-speed corridor by making it completely access-controlled.

The expressway was divided into 18 legs. But after changing its north end to Chilakaluripeta, the project remain with 14 legs.

The expressway would stretch for a length of 598.78 km (372.06 mi) and include 368.50 km (228.98 mi) of the service road. It will have a total length of 368.50 km of the Service Road. It will have 33 major bridges, four railway over bridges, 14 interchanges, and a 10 km length of the tunnel.

In view of the huge cost for land acquisition, the state government proposal to upgrade existing state highway between Anantapur and Tadipatri and extending it to Giddaluru and upgrading the state highway Giddaluru-Vinukonda- Guntur as an alternative. The proposal is accepted by the national government and is named as Anantapur-Guntur National highway 544D.

== Route ==
=== Way points on the route ===
Anantapur, Tadipatri, Kolimigundla, Belum Caves, Owk, Banaganapalli, Nandyal, Gajualapalli, Giddalur, Cumbum, Thokapalli, Vinukonda, Narasaraopet, Guntur.

== Junctions ==
NH 44 Terminal near Ananthpur.
NH 716 near Tadipatri.
NH 67 near Bugga.
NH 40 near Nandyal.
NH 167 near Narasaraopet.
NH 16 Terminal near Guntur.

== See also ==
- List of national highways in India
- List of national highways in India by state
