= Benz Circle =

- City centre
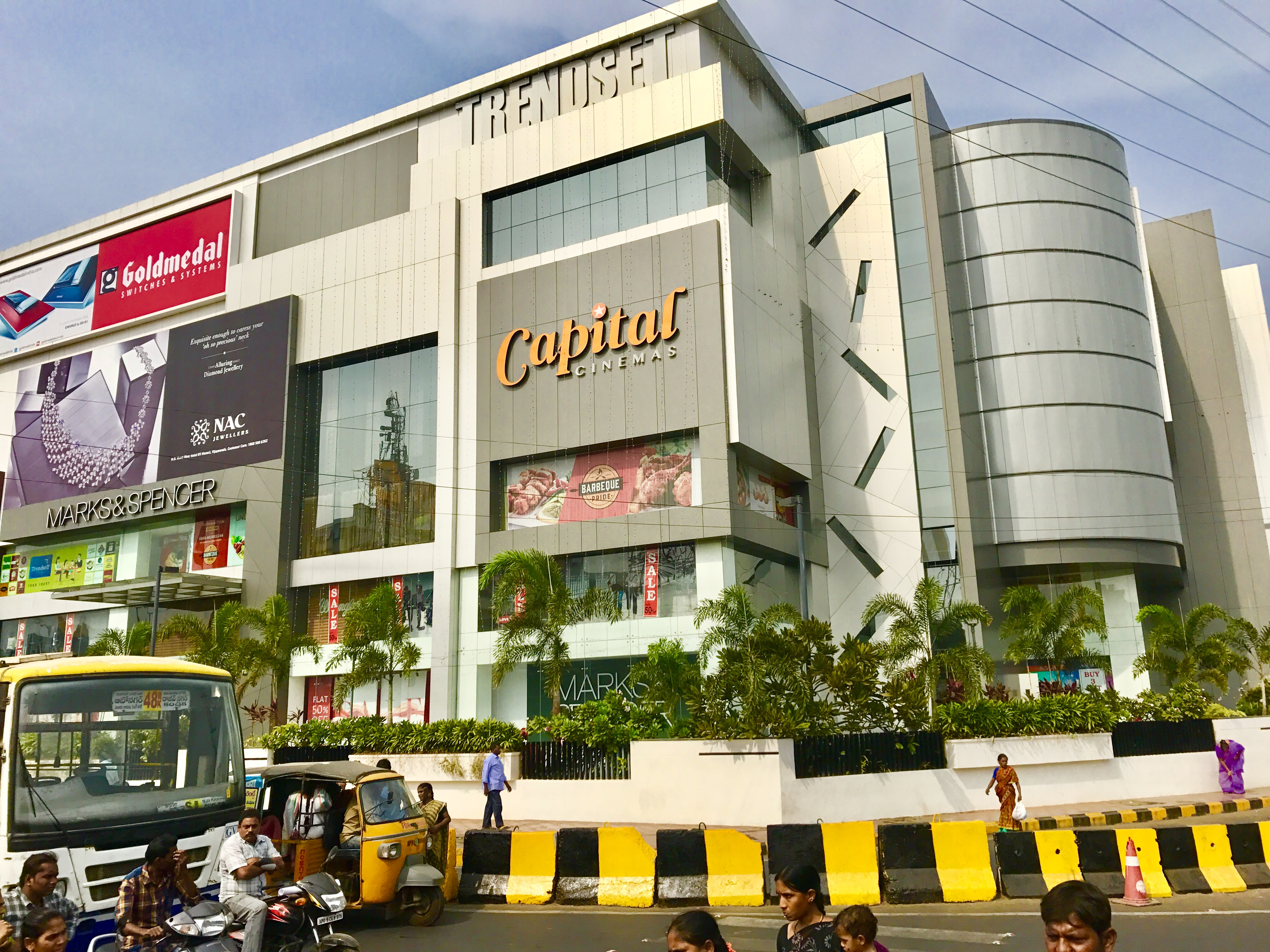

- Location within Andhra Pradesh
- Coordinates: 16°29′40″N 80°39′47″E
- State: Andhra Pradesh
- District: NTR district
- City: Vijayawada
- Ward: 12th
- Body: Vijayawada Municipal Corporation

Languages
  - Official: Telugu
- PIN: 520010
- Vehicle registration: AP-39

Benz Circle is not only a busy junction and also a major Residential and Commercial Locality in the East - Central part of the city. It is one of the most expensive commercial and residential locations in Andhra Pradesh land values near Benz Circle have risen to 1.2 lakh per sq yard making it the richest place in Andhra Pradesh . It is administered as Ward No.12 of Vijayawada Municipal Corporation

== History ==
Previously there was a Benz Company (Tata Motors-Mercedes Benz joint venture) beside this junction and this junction was named as Benz Circle. Later the company was removed but still people refer to this junction as Benz Circle and bus stop near this circle as "Benz Company bus stop".

== Traffic ==
Benz Circle is the busiest junction in Vijayawada with an average of 57,000 vehicles crossing daily. A flyover Benz Circle Flyover near Benz Circle was included in the road-widening project and the widening of "Vijayawada- Machilipatnam Highway" after Benz Circle towards east.

== Property ==
After the State Government announced Capital in and around Vijayawada Region, land values near Benz Circle have risen to 1.2 lakh per sq yard making it the richest place in Andhra Pradesh including Common Capital Hyderabad.
