= All India Institute of Medical Sciences, Mangalagiri =

Medical institute in India

- Seal of AIIMS Mangalagiri
- Other name: AIIMSMNG
- Motto: Sakal Swasthya Sarvada
- Motto in English: Health for All, Always
- Type: Public
- Established: 2018; 8 years ago
- President: Maj. Gen. (Dr.) Tapan Kumar Saha
- Director: Dr. Ahanthem Santa Singh
- Academic staff: 80
- Administrative staff: 120
- Students: 280+
- Location: Mangalagiri, Amaravati, Andhra Pradesh, 522503, India; 16.43°N 80.55°E
- Campus: 183 acres; Urban
- Website: www.aiimsmangalagiri.edu.in

All India Institute of Medical Sciences, Mangalagiri (AIIMS Mangalagiri) is a medical research public higher education institute located in the Mangalagiri, Amaravati, Guntur district, in the Andhra Pradesh ,state of India.

According to the IIRF 2025 rankings, AIIMS Mangalagiri has been ranked 29th among all medical institutes in India, 8th in the South Zone, and 1st in Andhra Pradesh.

== History ==
In July 2014, during the 2014–15 budget speech, the Minister of Finance Arun Jaitley announced an allocation of ₹500 crore for the establishment of four new “Phase-IV” All India Institutes of Medical Sciences (AIIMS) in Andhra Pradesh, West Bengal, the Vidarbha region of Maharashtra, and the Purvanchal region of Uttar Pradesh.

The AIIMS at Mangalagiri, Andhra Pradesh, was approved by the Union Cabinet in October 2015 at an estimated cost of ₹1,618 crore. Construction of the permanent campus began in September 2017, and the foundation stone was laid by Union Health Minister J. P. Nadda, Vice President of India M. Venkaiah Naidu, and Andhra Pradesh Chief Minister N. Chandrababu Naidu.

== Academics ==
AIIMS Mangalagiri commenced the 2018–19 academic session from a temporary campus at Siddhartha Medical College with 50 students. In the 2019–20 academic year, 50 more students joined the institute. The first batch at the permanent campus was the 2020-21 batch with 125 students. The outpatient department at the permanent campus started operating in March 2019. The inpatient department started in January 2021.

== See also ==
- Education in Guntur
- Education in India
- List of medical colleges in India
- All India Institute of Medical Sciences, New Delhi
