= Nekkallu =

Neighbourhood in Amaravati, Andhra Pradesh, India

- Neighbourhood
- Location in Andhra Pradesh, India
- Coordinates: 16.4907°N 80.4400°E
- Country: India
- State: Andhra Pradesh
- District: Guntur
- Mandal: Thullur

Population (2011)
  - Total: 1,908

Languages
  - Official: Telugu
- Time zone: UTC+5:30 (IST)
- PIN: 522 236
- Telephone code: +91–8645
- Vehicle registration: AP-07

Nekkallu is a neighbourhood in Amaravati, Andhra Pradesh, India. It is a part of Urban Notified Area of Amaravati. It was a village in Thullur mandal of in Guntur district, prior to its denotification as gram panchayat.

== Demographics ==
As of 2011 Census of India, the village had a population of 1,908, of which males are 936, females are 972 with sex ratio 1038. The population under 6 years of age are 224. The average literacy rate stands at 61.70%.

== Transport ==
Nekkallu is located on the Amaravathi and Mangalagiri route. APSRTC run buses provide transport services from Amaravathi and Mangalagiri to Nekkallu.
