= Sakhamuru =

Neighbourhood in Amaravati, Andhra Pradesh, India

- Neighbourhood
- Location in Andhra Pradesh, India
- Coordinates: 16.4907°N 80.4767°E
- Country: India
- State: Andhra Pradesh
- District: Guntur
- Mandal: Thullur

Population (2011)
  - Total: 1,218

Languages
  - Official: Telugu
- Time zone: UTC+5:30 (IST)
- PIN: 522 503
- Telephone code: +91–8645
- Vehicle registration: AP-07

Sakhamuru is a neighbourhood in Amaravati, Andhra Pradesh, India. It is a part of Urban Notified Area of Amaravati. It was a village in Thullur mandal of in Guntur district, prior to its denotification as gram panchayat.

== Demographics ==
As of 2011 Census of India, the village had a population of 1,218, of which males are 583, females are 635 with sex ratio 1089. The population under 6 years of age are 143. The average literacy rate stands at 66.88%.

== Transport ==
Sakhamuru is located 1km away from the Thullur and Guntur route. APSRTC run buses provide transport services from Guntur to Thulluru.
