= Outer Ring Road, Amaravati =

Proposed road in Andhra Pradesh, India

- Amaravati Outer Ring Road

Route information
- Length: 189.93 km (118.02 mi)

Major junctions
- Ring road around Amaravati

Location
- Country: India
- State: Andhra Pradesh

Highway system
- Roads in India; Expressways; National; State; Asian; State Highways in Andhra Pradesh

The Outer Ring Road is a proposed 189.9 kilometers six line ring road expressway encirciling Andhra Pradesh Capital Region spread over NTR, Guntur and Krishna districts. Guntur-Tenali-Vuyyuru-Amaravati urban alignment. It is being built by the National Highways Authority of India under Phase–VII of National Highways Development Project.

It gives connectivity between NH 65, NH 30, NH 16.

== History ==
In 2015 this was proposed by A.P Government for fast transportation around the Amaravati capital region.

== Interchanges ==
Initially there was a plan to construct 19 interchanges. To reduce costs, they were removed.

Location	Connecting Road	Type
Kuchikacharla (Okato)	Vijayawada–Hyderabad NH	Double Trumpet
Chalivendrapalem	Vijayawada–Machilipatnam Highway	Double Trumpet
Ponnavaram	Kanchikacherla–Madhira State Highway	Rotary
Duggirala	Vijayawada–Khammam–Nagpur Highway (NH-1632)	Double Trumpet
Mileva	Ibrahimpatnam–Bhadrachalam–Jagdalpur–Raipur Highway	Rotary
Adivinekkalam	Adivinekkalam–Velvatam Road	Rotary
Agiripalli	Vijayawada–Nuzvid Road	Double Trumpet
Pottipadu	Chennai–Kolkata Highway (NH-16)	Double Trumpet
Gannavaram	Gannavaram–Puttigunta Road	Rotary
Manikonda	Vijayawada–Gudivada Road	Rotary
Nandivelugu	Guntur–Hanumanpalem Road	Rotary
Narakodur	Narakodur–Budampadu Spur Road	Double Trumpet
Ananthavarappadu	Ananthavarappadu–Mukturu Road	Rotary
Pulladigunta	Guntur–Prathipadu–Parchur Road	Rotary
Pottur–Lingayapalem	Chennai–Kolkata Highway (NH-16)	Double Trumpet
Medikondur	Vinukonda–Guntur Highway	Single Trumpet
Balusupadu	Sattenapalle–Amaravati State Highway	Rotary

== See also ==
- Outer Ring Road, Bengaluru
- List of longest ring roads
