= Uddandarayunipalem =

Neighbourhood in Amaravati, Andhra Pradesh, India

- Neighbourhood
- Location in Andhra Pradesh, India
- Coordinates: 16°32′31″N 80°30′53″E
- Country: India
- State: Andhra Pradesh
- District: Guntur

Government
  - Body: Grama Panchayati

Area
  - Total: 4.31 km^{2} (1.66 sq mi)

Population (2011)
  - Total: 1,503
  - Density: 349/km^{2} (903/sq mi)

Languages
  - Official: Telugu
- Time zone: UTC+5:30 (IST)
- PIN: 522503
- Telephone code: 91-8645

Uddandarayunipalem is a neighbourhood in Amaravati, Andhra Pradesh, India. It is a part of Urban Notified Area of Amaravati. It was a village in Thullur mandal of Guntur district, prior to its denotification as gram panchayat. It also hosted the foundation stone ceremony of Amaravati, on 22 October 2015, when Prime Minister Narendra Modi laid the foundation stone of Amaravati.

== Etymology ==
Head of the Telugu Department of Nagarjuna University, Prof. Yarlagadda Balagangadhara Rao, in his book Navyandhra Rajadhani Prantha Gramala Charitra, mentions that king Kota Ketaraju of the Dhurjaya dynasty and ruler of Dharanikota built the village in memory of his father Uddandarayudu. The term ‘Uddanda’ means capable or robust. An inscription is available in Bejathapuram, a nearby village. As per some reports the history of the village dates back to the reign of Vijayanagara emperor Sri Krishnadevaraya. According to legend, Sri Krishnadevarya halted at Thullur on his way to invade Kondapalli Kota in Krishna district. Uddandarayunipalem may have been named after Uddandaraya, a commander of Sri Krishnadevaraya.

== Transport ==
Uddandarayunipalem is connected by the Vijayawada-Undavalli-Uddandarayunipalem Road (also known as Vijayawada–Amaravati Road). APSRTC operates buses on this route from Pandit Nehru bus station of Vijayawada.
