= Venkatapalem =

Neighbourhood in Amaravati, Andhra Pradesh, India

- Neighbourhood
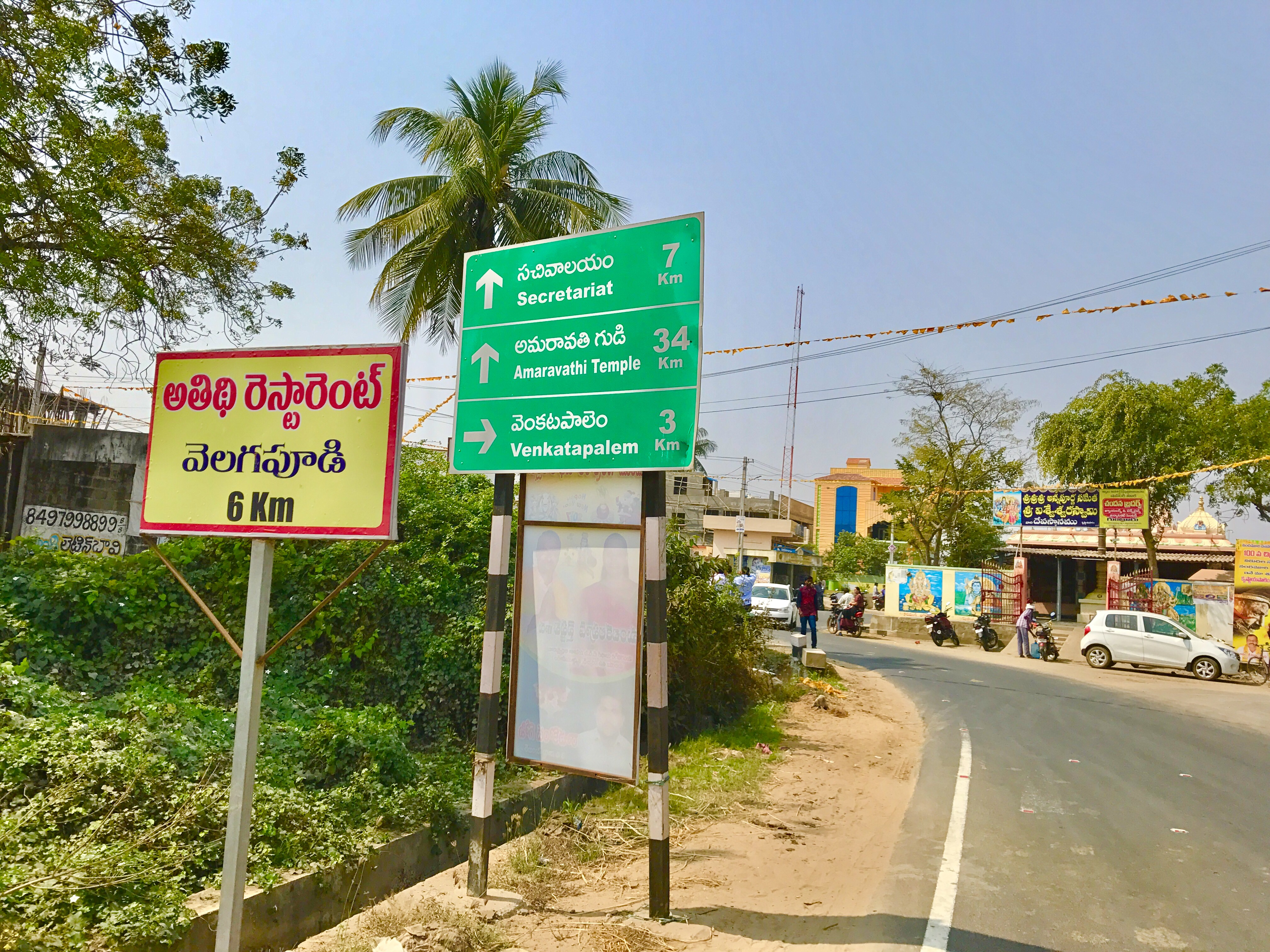
- Board showing Directions to Venkatapalem

- Location in Andhra Pradesh, India
- Coordinates: 16.5127°N 80.5529°E
- Country: India
- State: Andhra Pradesh
- District: Guntur

Area
  - Total: 11.10 km^{2} (4.29 sq mi)

Population (2011)
  - Total: 6,000
  - Density: 540/km^{2} (1,400/sq mi)
- PIN: 522 237
- ISO 3166 code: IN-AP

Venkatapalem is a neighbourhood in Amaravati, Andhra Pradesh, India. It is a part of Urban Notified Area of Amaravati. It was a village in Thullur mandal of Guntur district, prior to its denotification as gram panchayat.

== Transport ==
Venkatapalem to connected by a road to Amaravathi-Vijayawada road. State runs APS RTC busses on this road very frequently.
