= Errupalem–Amaravati–Namburu railway line =

Indian railway section

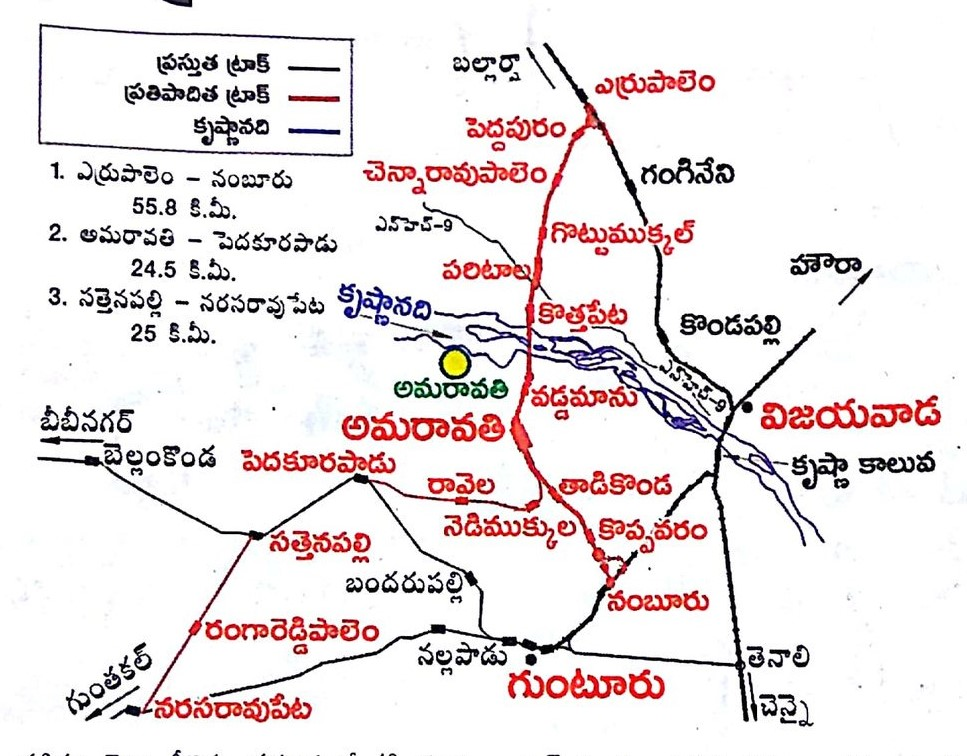
- Errupalem–Amaravathi–Nambur railway line route details

Overview
- Status: Under construction
- Owner: Indian Railways
- Locale: Andhra Pradesh, Telangana
- Termini: Errupalem; Namburu

Service
- Operator: South Coast Railway zone

Technical
- Line length: 56.53 km (35.13 mi)
- Track gauge: 1,676 mm (5 ft 6 in)
- Electrification: Ongoing
- Operating speed: 130 km/h

The Errupalem–Amaravati–Namburu railway line is an upcoming broad-gauge railway line project of the Indian Railways. The section falls under the administration of Guntur of South Central Railway zone. This route connects Andhra Pradesh capital Amaravati to other parts of the Andhra Pradesh and rest of India.

== The project ==
The project was sanctioned in the year 2017–18. Notification for land acquisation was given on 18 June 2024. with Kazipet–Vijayawada section at Errupalem railway station in Telangana state and Guntur–Krishna Canal section line at Namburu railway station, which further connects with Vijayawada–Gudur line. This serves as bypass route to Tenali- Warangal.

== Proposed list of stations ==
It starts from Errupalem railway station in Kazipet–Vijayawada section and passes through Peddapuram, Chennaravupalem, Gottimukala, Paritala, Kothapeta, Vaddamanu, Amaravati, Tadikonda, Koppuravuru finally connects Namburu at Guntur–Krishna Canal section
