= Dondapadu =

Neighbourhood in Amaravati, Andhra Pradesh, India

- Neighbourhood
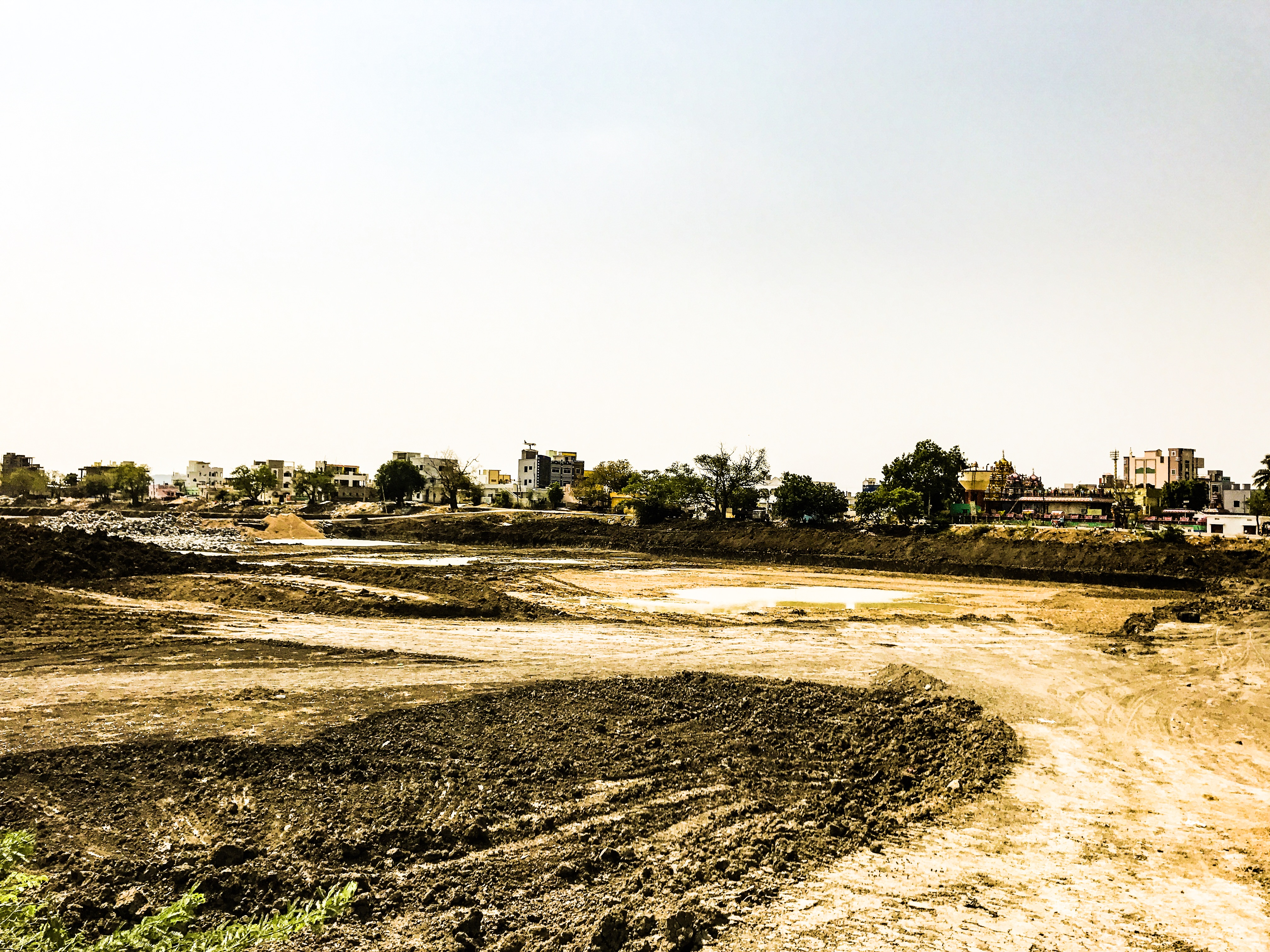
- Dondapadu village

- Location in Andhra Pradesh, India
- Coordinates: 16.4589°N 81.0354°E
- Country: India
- State: Andhra Pradesh
- District: Guntur

Area
  - Total: 3.91 km^{2} (1.51 sq mi)

Population (2011)
  - Total: 2,664
  - Density: 681/km^{2} (1,760/sq mi)

Languages
  - Official: Telugu
- Time zone: UTC+5:30 (IST)
- PIN: 522 237
- Vehicle registration: AP

Dondapadu is a neighbourhood in Amaravati, Andhra Pradesh, India. It is a part of Urban Notified Area of Amaravati. It was a village in Thullur mandal of Guntur district, prior to its denotification as gram panchayat.
