= Amaravati Government Complex =

Government and civic precinct in Amaravati, Andhra Pradesh

General information
- Status: Under construction
- Location: Amaravati, Andhra Pradesh, India
- Completed: 2028 (planned)
- Client: Andhra Pradesh Capital Region Development Authority (APCRDA)
- Owner: Government of Andhra Pradesh

Design and construction
- Architects: Foster + Partners, Hafeez Contractor

Amaravati Government Complex (AGC) is a planned government complex which is under construction in Amaravati, Andhra Pradesh, India. The AGC has various administrative facilities of the Government of Andhra Pradesh such as the Andhra Pradesh legislative assembly, high court, secretariat, and heads of departments.

== History ==
=== Planning ===
Following the bifurcation of Andhra Pradesh under the Andhra Pradesh Reorganisation Act, 2014, the Government of Andhra Pradesh decided Amaravati to be the capital of Andhra Pradesh. A master plan was prepared for the construction of Amaravati, under that master plan, the Amaravati Government Complex (AGC) was marked for establishing government buildings. The area of AGC is about 1575 acres.

=== Design and development ===
In March 2016, after an international competition, "Maki and Associates" was selected to design the complex but the contract was terminated. Foster + Partners, L&T and Hafeez Contractor were later engaged for the designing.

=== Construction ===
After the 2019 Andhra Pradesh Legislative Assembly election, the newly elected government initiated review of the Amaravati capital project which halted the construction of AGC which is part of the capital project.

After June 2024, the construction of capital project resumed including AGC.

The buildings of legislative assembly, high court, secretariat and HOD facilities were categorised as "iconic buildings" and APCRDA has awarded tender for construction to the following firms:

Building	Constructing firm	Status	Ref.
Legislative Assembly	Larsen & Toubro Limited	Under-construction	
High Court	NCC Limited	Under-construction	
GAD Tower	NCC Limited	Under-construction	
Secretariat Towers 1 and 2	Shapoorji & Pallonji Co Ltd	Under-construction	
Secretariat Towers 3 and 4	Larsen & Toubro Limited	Under-construction	

== Buildings ==
=== Legislative Assembly ===
The legislative assembly is about 103 acres in area within the AGC. It is designed to have a large artificial freshwater lake within it while the building was designed to be 250 metres tall with a conical roof and spire. A needle like form was designed to reflect the letter "A" with a viewing gallery at the top.

=== High court ===
The design of the High court of Andhra Pradesh has stepped up roof profile inspired from traditional Buddhist stupas found in the region. The complex is about 42 acres within AGC and designed to be 55 metres tall.

=== Secretariat and GAD Towers ===
The five towers in this complex are designed to consolidate the various departments of the state government into a single operational hub. It is located in about 32 acres of area within the AGC. The five towers are being built next to Palavagu, with two towers postitioned on the north side and the other three on the south. Four of the five towers were designed to be 40 storeyed towers while the fifth tower which is the General Administration Department (GAD) tower is designed to be a 50 storeyed building, the towers are being built with diagrid framework.

== Architecture and design ==
The master plan designed for Amaravati Government Complex organizes the individual governmental institutions around a green axial spine. According to the plan, the urban design incorporates spatial similarities to large-scale civic schemes such as Lutyens' Delhi and Central Park where the major governmental buildings are organized along a main spine with public plazas, footpaths, and landscape features. In particular, the precinct was designed to connect legislative, judicial, and executive branches using shared spaces and water features such as an artificial lake for the Assembly and the Palavagu stream near the Secretariat towers.

Unlike the executive Secretariat towers that use diagrid framework and high-rise configuration, the legislative and judicial buildings have different roof designs. The Assembly uses a conical spire roof while the High Court has a terraced roof.

The design scheme of the precinct includes the use of regional history and culture. The High Court's roof features the stepped design inspired by the ancient Buddhist stupas while the Assembly roof is shaped in accordance with the letter "A" referring to Amaravati.

== Central Government institutions ==
In June 2026, the Government of India approved construction of a Central Government General Pool Office Accommodation (CGGPOA) and General Pool Residential Accommodation (GPRA) in Amaravati. The area of these institutions fall near AGC in plots C-8 and C-9.

== See also ==
- Government of India
- Government of Andhra Pradesh
- The Gherkin
