= Amaravati Quantum Valley =

Quantum Valley in India

- Quantum Technology Park
- Location: Amaravati, Andhra Pradesh, India
- Owner: Government of Andhra Pradesh
- Status: Under construction
- Industry: Quantum technology
- Facilities: Quantum computing facility, Quantum Valley Tech Park
- Investment target: US$1 billion by 2029
- Expected operation: January 2027

Amaravati Quantum Valley is a planned quantum technology park and hub dedicated to innovation and research in the field of quantum computing and technology in India. It is located in Amaravati, Andhra Pradesh. The quantum technology hub is expected to attract huge investments worth US$1 billion and is aligned with the goals of the National Quantum Mission to increase productivity and create wealth through technology developed there.

IBM and Tata Consultancy Services have planned to build India's largest quantum computer at the tech park, featuring a 156-qubit IBM Heron processor. The park is seen as a historic opportunity for Andhra Pradesh to become a global hub for emerging quantum technology. It is also considered the first dedicated "Quantum Valley" tech park in South Asia.

== History ==
In March 2025, the Government of Andhra Pradesh planned to establish the Quantum Valley in Amaravati as part of India's National Quantum Mission. On 4 May 2025, the government signed a memorandum of understanding with IBM, Tata Consultancy Services (TCS), and Larsen & Toubro (L&T) to build the 156-qubit Quantum System Two at the Quantum Valley. In the MoU signing ceremony, the chief minister N. Chandrababu Naidu announced that IBM would install the computer there.

== Planning ==
The Government of Andhra Pradesh is viewing the project of the proposed Amaravati Quantum Valley as a new dimension to the state's emerging knowledge ecosystem. The government is aiming to establish Amaravati as a quantum computing hub in the same line as Hyderabad had been established as the IT hub. P. Narayana, Andhra Pradesh's Minister of Municipal Administration and Urban Development, said:

Just as Hyderabad has become an IT hub, Amaravati is going to become a quantum computing hub,

— P. Narayana

On 25 August 2026, a Memorandum of Understanding was signed between the municipal administration and the urban development department of Andhra Pradesh and the UK government covering infrastructure development, urban planning, technology transfer, and urban mobility to step up the quantum push of the Amaravati Quantum Valley.

== Development ==
A quantum computing building is under construction at the selected location. On 25 August 2026, P. Narayana inspected the work in progress at the construction site.

According to Narayana, the quantum computing services of the quantum valley are expected to be operational by January 2027. The quantum computing facility is being developed using German technology.

== Quantum Valley Tech Park ==
A Quantum Valley Tech Park is being built around the specialized quantum computing facility to accommodate related companies. Two towers are currently under construction.
