= Lingayapalem =

Neighbourhood in Amaravati, Andhra Pradesh, India

- Neighbourhood
- Location in Andhra Pradesh, India
- Coordinates: 16°33′10″N 80°29′48″E
- Country: India
- State: Andhra Pradesh
- District: Guntur
- Mandal: Thullur

Area
  - Total: 7.98 km^{2} (3.08 sq mi)

Population (2011)
  - Total: 1,554
  - Density: 195/km^{2} (504/sq mi)

Languages
  - Official: Telugu
- Time zone: UTC+5:30 (IST)
- PIN: 522 504
- Telephone code: +91–8645
- Vehicle registration: AP-07

Lingayapalem is a neighbourhood in Amaravati, Andhra Pradesh, India. It is a part of Urban Notified Area of Amaravati. It was a village in Thullur mandal of in Guntur district, prior to its denotification as gram panchayat.

== Demographics ==
As of 2011 Census of India, the village had a population of 1,554, of which males are 768, females are 786 with average sex ratio 1023 and the population under 6 years of age are 136. The average literacy rate stands at 56.75 percent, with 882 literates.

== Transport ==
Lingayapalem is located on the Vijayawada and Amaravathi routes. APSRTC run buses provide transport services from Vijayawada to Lingayapalem.
