= Undavalli =

- Neighbourhood
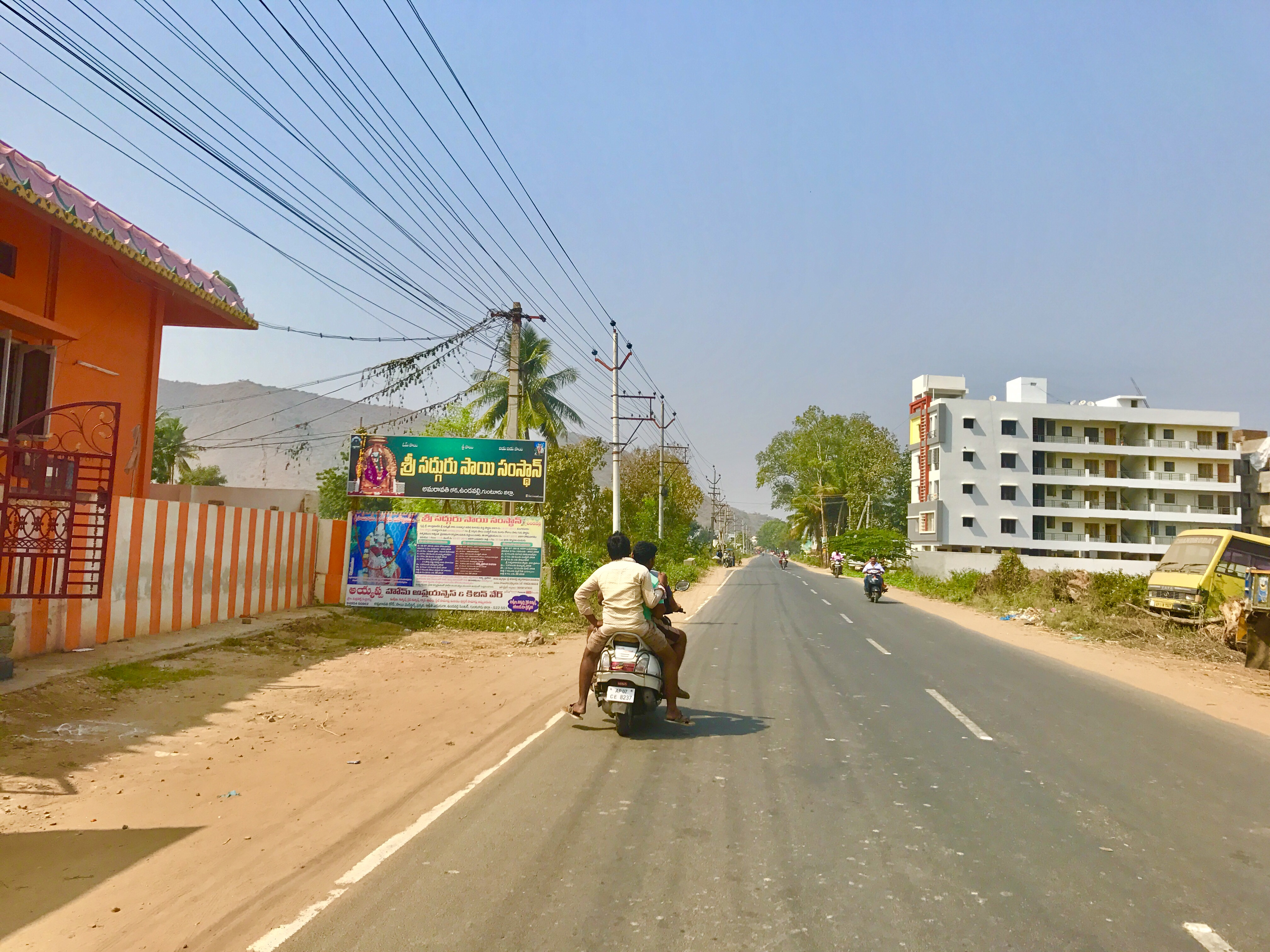
- Undavalle village along Amaravathi road

- Location in Andhra Pradesh, India
- Coordinates: 16.4957°N 80.5800°E
- Country: India
- State: Andhra Pradesh
- District: Guntur
- Mandal: Tadepalli

Area
  - Total: 13.05 km^{2} (5.04 sq mi)
- Elevation: 24 m (79 ft)

Population (2011)
  - Total: 9,743
  - Density: 746.6/km^{2} (1,934/sq mi)

Languages
  - Official: Telugu
- Time zone: UTC+5:30 (IST)
- PIN: 522501
- Vehicle registration: AP–07

Undavalli is part of Mangalagiri–Tadepalli Municipal Corporation, in the Indian state of Andhra Pradesh. It was a village in Tadepalli mandal of Guntur district, prior to its de-notification as gram panchayat. 5th century Buddhist and Hindu Undavalli Caves which signify Monolithic Indian rock-cut architecture are present at this place. It is a part of Vijayawada Urban Agglomeration.

== Geography ==
Undavalli is located at 16.4957°N 80.5800°E. It has an average elevation of 24 m (79 ft). It is situated on the south bank of Krishna River.

== Governance ==
Kakarlamudi gram panchayat is the local self-government of the village. The gram panchayat was awarded Nirmala Grama Puraskaram for the year 2013.

== Transport ==
The Vijayawada-Amaravati road connects Undavalli with Vijayawada. APSRTC operates buses on this route from Pandit Nehru bus station of Vijayawada.

== See also ==
- List of villages in Guntur district
