= Kanaka Durga Varadhi =

Road bridge over Krishna river, India

- Coordinates: 16°29′34″N 80°37′09″E
- Carries: 4 Lanes of road
- Crosses: Krishna River
- Locale: Vijayawada
- Other name: Vijayawada-Guntur Varadhi
- Preceded by: Prakasam Barrage

Characteristics
- Design: Beam bridge
- Total length: 2.6 kilometres (1.6 mi)
- Longest span: 34 metres (112 ft)
- No. of spans: 47

History
- Opened: 1995

Location
- Interactive map of Kanaka Durga Varadhi

The Kanaka Durga Varadhi is a beam bridge Spanning Across Krishna River in between Mangalagiri Tadepalle Municipal Corporation and Vijayawada, Andhra Pradesh, India. It is the Third Longest Road Bridge in Andhra Pradesh, After Bridges on Godavari River, Whereas the Longest of all bridges is in Andhra Pradesh Capital Region. Its construction was followed by old barrage named Prakasam Barrage, which serves the transportation needs of Vijayawada.

Previously, the Bridge was 2,200 metres long, Consisting of 47 Spans of 34 M in a straight Line without any Curves. It was later Extended under the Project of expanding NH16 from Vijayawada to Chennai. Now the bridge is 2.6 Kilometers Long with a Curve Consisting of a Flyover that intersects NH65, which connects Machilipatnam with Hyderabad. It was 27th largest bridge in India.

== Geography ==
The Kanaka Durga varadhi is built across the Krishna River (second largest river in South India, only after Godavari River at over 1,000 kilometres (620 mi) length) as it enters into the deltaic reach before debouching into the sea 95 kilometres (59 mi) downstream of the bridge, the fourth largest river in India. At the location of the bridge, near Vijayawada, the river flows with a width of about 1.8 kilometres (1.1 mi), and there is an island named Yenamalakuduru located in the river, where the river flows as two channels with widths of 700m and 400m. The maximum discharge observed in the river is reported to be around 1,110,000 cu ft/s (31,000 m3/s).

== Construction ==
In 2012 NHAI constructed a bridge by extending Kanaka Durga Varadhi towards Vijayawada to ease flow of traffic towards Hyderabad. This was part of widening National Highway 16 from Eluru to Chilakaluripet. A park is being constructed below this flyover with Dharmachakras that resembles chakras which surround Amaravathi Mahachaitya by Amaravathi Development corporation with a radius of 40 feet. This project will ease the transportation between Kolkata and Chennai.

== See also ==
- List of road bridges
- List of longest bridges in the world
- List of longest bridges above water in India
