= Amaravati =

Capital of Andhra Pradesh, India

- State capital city
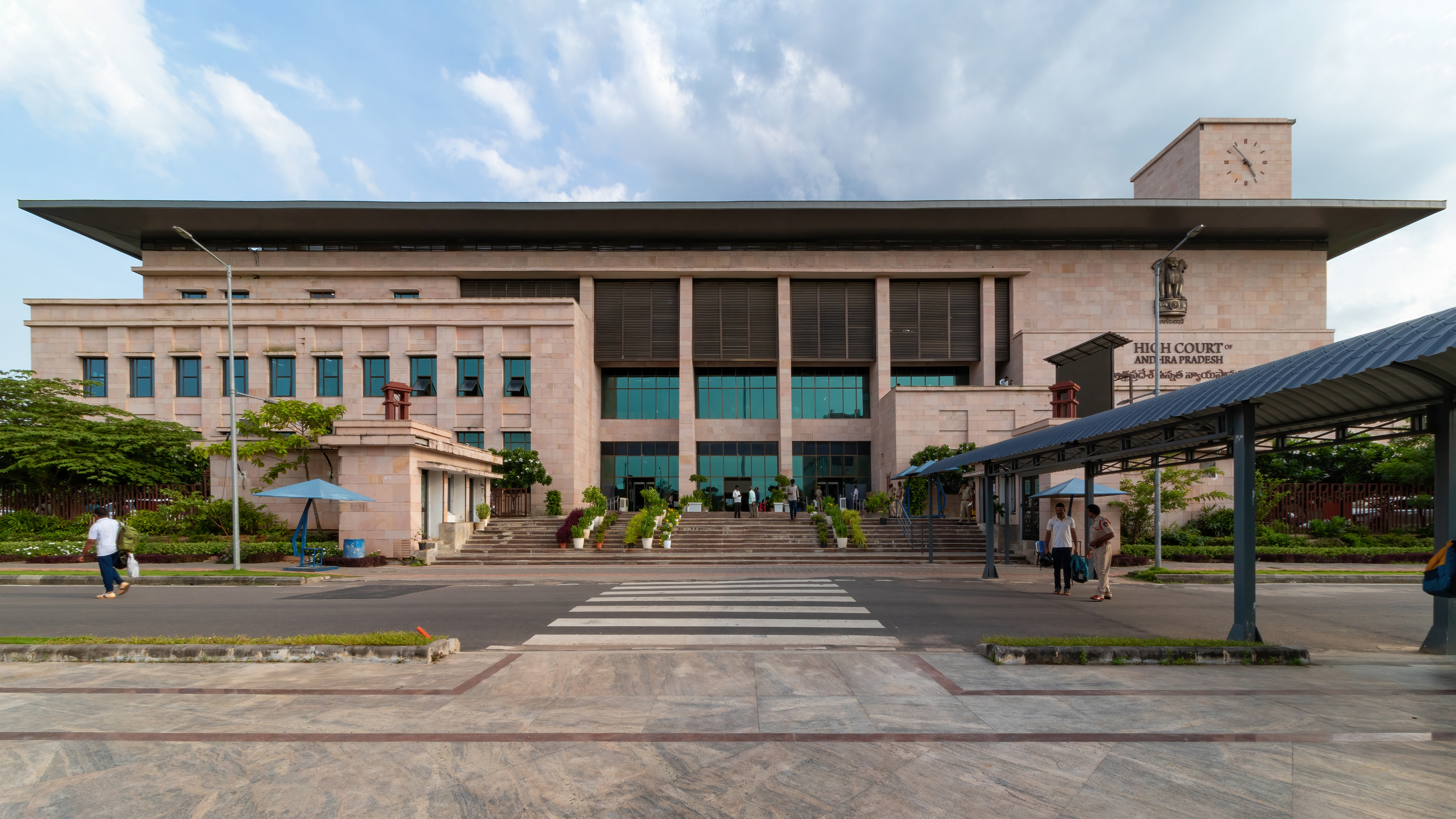
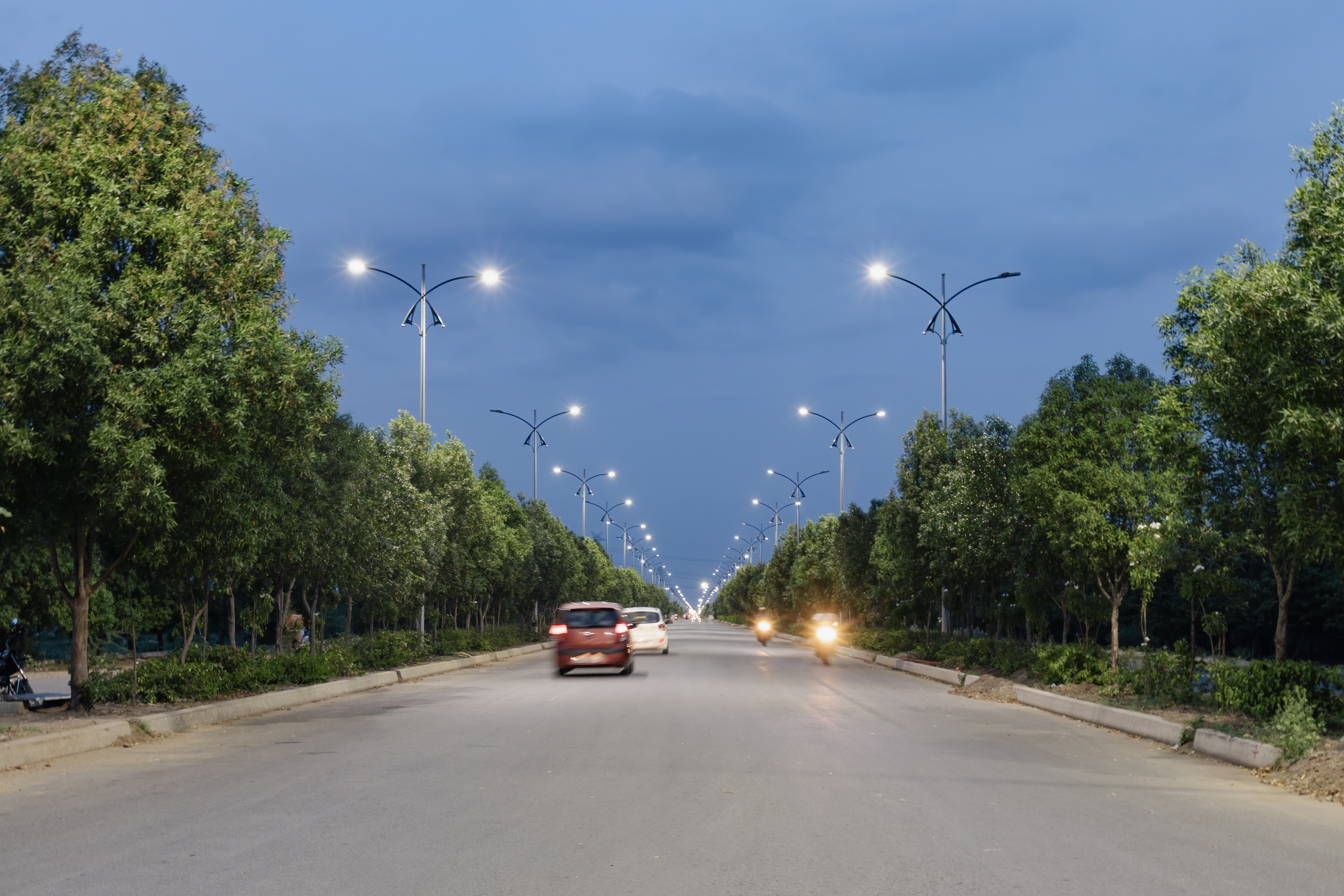
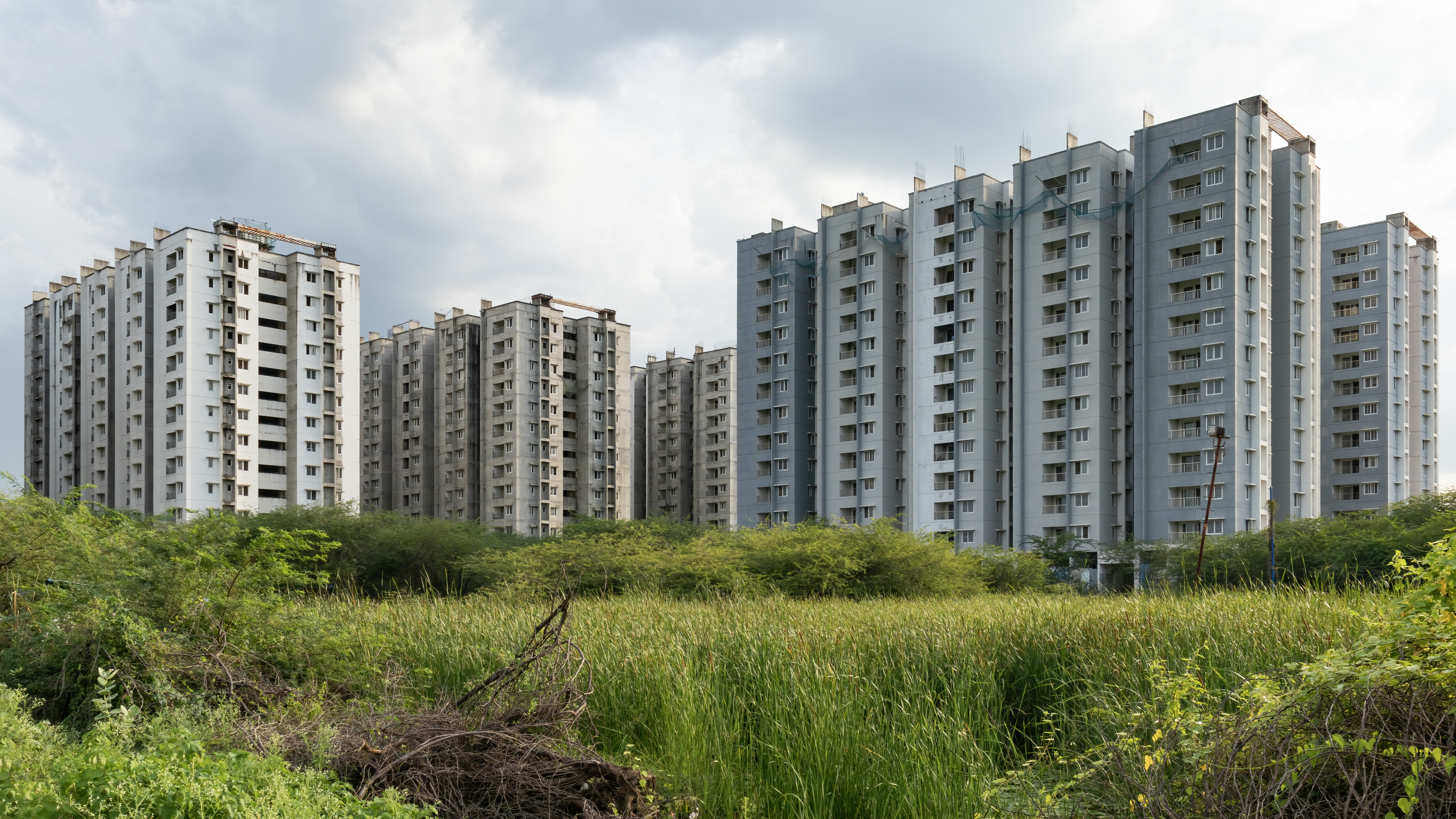
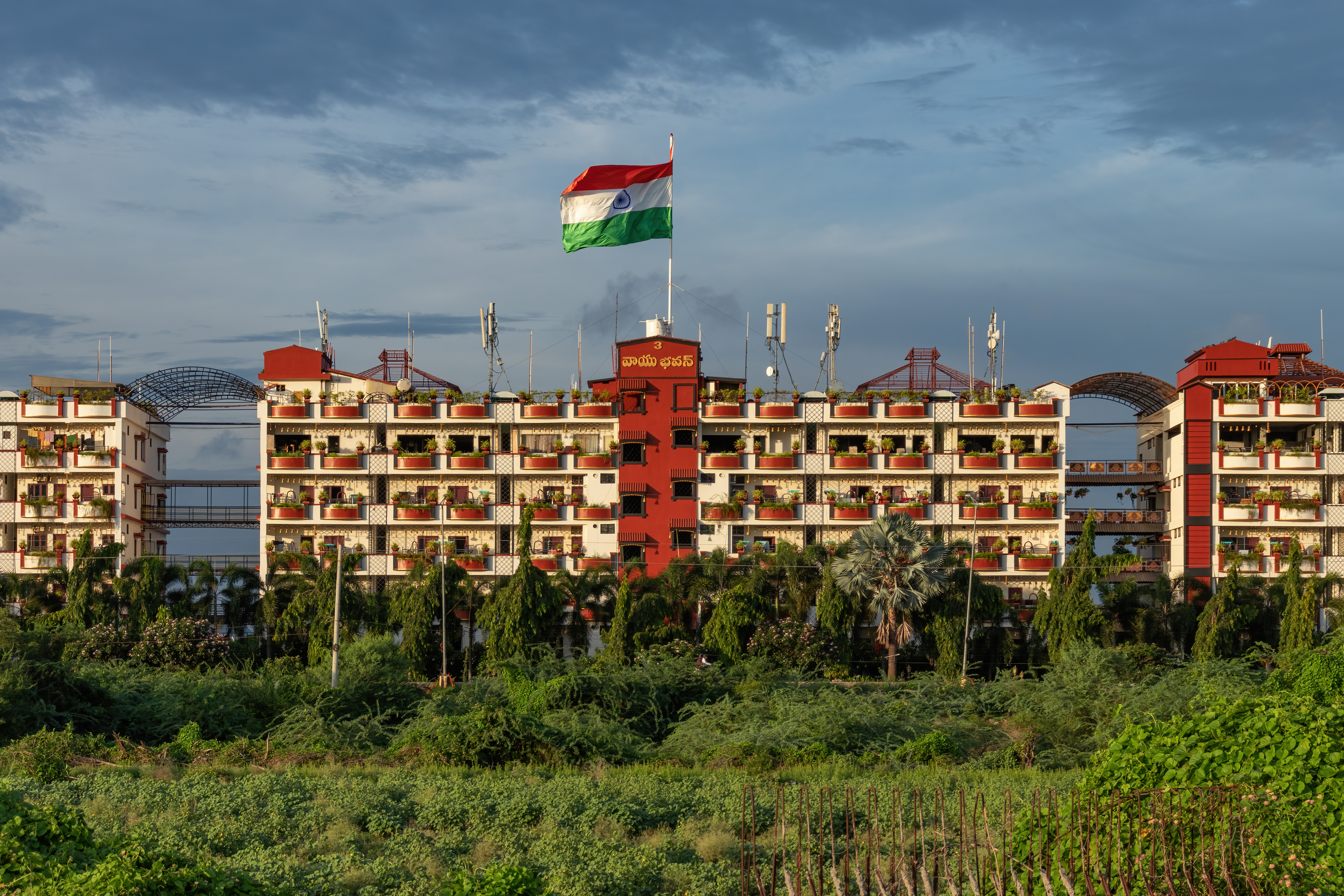
- Clockwise from top: High Court of Andhra Pradesh in Nelapadu, Buildings under construction in Amaravati Government Complex, Manthena Satyanarayana Raju Ashram, Amaravati Seed Access Road
- Interactive map of Amaravati
- Location in Andhra Pradesh Location in India
- Coordinates: 16.513100°N 80.516500°E
- Country: India
- State: Andhra Pradesh
- Region: Coastal Andhra
- District: Guntur
- Established: 2014 (12 Years ago)
- Founder: N. Chandrababu Naidu
- Named for: Amaravathi, Amaravati Stupa, Amararama

Government
  - Type: Urban Planning Agency
  - Body: Andhra Pradesh Capital Region Development Authority

Area
  - State capital city: 217.23 km^{2} (83.87 sq mi)
  - Metro (Note: The Amaravati metropolitan area also includes portions of Vijayawada, Guntur, Amaravati, Tenali, Gudivada, Tadepalle, Jaggayyapeta, Mangalagiri, Mopidevi, Nuzvid, Ponnur, Sattenapalle, Challapalle, Nandigama, Ghantasala, Vuyyuru adjoining the APCR.): 8,352.69 km^{2} (3,224.99 sq mi)
- Elevation: 49 m (161 ft)

Population (2011)
  - State capital city: 103,000
  - Metro: 5,873,588
- Time zone: UTC+5:30 (IST)
- Pincode(s): 520 XXX, 521 XXX, 522 XXX
- Area code(s): | area_code = +91 8645 (Mangalagiri), +91 0863 (Guntur), +91 0866 (Vijayawada)
- Vehicle registration: AP-39, AP-40
- Official languages: Telugu
- Website: Amaravati official website

Amaravati (English: /ʌməˈrɑːvəθɪ/ uh-mə-RAH-vuh-thi, Telugu: Amarāvati) is the capital city of the Indian state of Andhra Pradesh. (Note: Amaravati currently serves as the seat of government where Andhra Pradesh Secretariat, Andhra Pradesh Legislature and High Court of Andhra Pradesh are located.) It is located in Guntur district on the southern bank of the Krishna River, 2 kilometres (1.2 mi) southwest of Vijayawada, 15 kilometres (9.3 mi) northwest of Guntur. The city derives its name from the nearby historic site of Amaravati, which served as the capital of the Satavahana Empire nearly two thousand years ago.

The city is an urban notified area. Urban development and planning activities are undertaken by the Amaravati Development Corporation Limited and Andhra Pradesh Capital Region Development Authority (APCRDA). The APCRDA has jurisdiction over the city and the conurbation covering Andhra Pradesh Capital Region. The city is spread over an area of 217.23 km^{2} (83.87 sq mi), and comprises neighbourhoods (including some hamlets) from three mandals viz., Mangalagiri, Thullur and Tadepalli. The seed capital is spread over an area of 16.94 km^{2} (6.54 mi^{2}).

== Etymology ==
Amaravati literally translates to "the abode of immortals". The name holds deep historical, spiritual and mythological significance. The name is also used for a region near Dharanikota, which served as the ancient capital of the Satavahana dynasty, also known as the Andhras. In Hinduism, Buddhism, and Jainism, Amaravati is the celestial capital of Swarga (heaven), where the Devas (gods) reside.

== History ==
Timeline of Amaravati
Date	Event
2 June 2014	The Andhra Pradesh Reorganisation Act, 2014, came into force
1 September 2014	The location of the new capital city was finalized
30 December 2014	The APCRDA Act, 2014, came into effect
January 2015	The voluntary Land Pooling Scheme was announced
March 2015	Consent for pooling 33,000 acres was obtained from farmers
6 June 2015	Chief Minister N. Chandrababu Naidu conducted the bhoomi puja (ground-breaking ceremony) for Amaravati
22 October 2015	Indian Prime Minister Narendra Modi laid the foundation stone for Amaravati
March 2017	The interim government legislature and secretariat began functioning from the city
27 December 2018	Chandrababu Naidu laid the foundation stone for the Amaravati Government Complex
3 February 2019	The Chief Justice of India laid the foundation stone for the Andhra High Court in Amaravati
31 July 2020	The Governor gave assent to the Andhra Pradesh Decentralisation and Inclusive Development of All Regions Bill, 2020
22 November 2021	The Andhra Pradesh Decentralisation and Inclusive Development of All Regions Act, 2020, was withdrawn
5 March 2022	The High Court directed the state government to develop Amaravati as the capital city
8 June 2024	All development works resumed.
2 April 2026	Amaravati was named the capital of Andhra Pradesh through the Andhra Pradesh Reorganisation (Amendment) Act, 2026 effective retrospectively from 2 June 2024
Late 2028	Infrastructure in Phase I is expected to be completed

=== Early and medieval history ===
The nearby Dharanikota (Dhānyakatakam) was the capital city of the Satavahana dynasty. Its history dates back to the second century BCE. The Satavahanas are significant in the history of Andhra Pradesh. Their primary language was Prakrit written using the Brahmi script, which served as the base for of Telugu script. The practice of Buddhism was predominant during their period and the dynasty was partly responsible for the prevalence of the faith in the region. The city was also once a holy site of Mahayana Buddhism. The city used to have a large Buddhist Stupa, now known as Amaravati Stupa. It was also the centre of Buddhist learning and art with several Buddhist followers from many South East Asian countries visiting.

The Satavahanas, Ikshvakus, Vishnukundina, Pallavas, Cholas, Kakatiyas, Delhi Sultanate, Reddi Kingdom, Bahmani Sultanate, Vijayanagara Empire, Sultanate of Golconda and the Mughal Empire successively ruled this area before the founding of the Nizamate of Hyderabad in 1724. It was ceded to France in 1750, but was captured by the East India Company in 1759. It was returned to the Nizam in 1768, but was ceded to Britain again in 1788. As part of the Madras Presidency, it was ruled by Vasireddy Venkatadri Nayudu, the hereditary zamindar of Chintapalli, who founded modern Amaravathi village, near the ruins of the ancient stupa.

=== Foundation of Amaravati ===
As per the Andhra Pradesh Reorganisation Act, 2014, Hyderabad became the capital of the newly formed state of Telangana, post bifurcation of Andhra Pradesh. The Central Government formed an expert committee to explore alternatives for the new capital of Andhra Pradesh, in accordance with the Andhra Pradesh Reorganisation Act, 2014. The committee was tasked with evaluating the suitability of various locations based on data analysis, site visits, and stakeholder consultations. Its duties included assessing the availability of land, water, and natural resources while considering environmental sustainability and the potential for urban growth. It evaluated transportation options including rail, road and air connectivity between the new capital and other major cities. The committee consisted of several experts from various national institutes.

Chief Minister N. Chandrababu Naidu announced that the new capital of the state would be located around Vijayawada. This decision followed a consultative process and was approved by the State Cabinet on September 1, 2014. Chief Minister Naidu stated that the state planned a decentralised development approach, with three mega cities and 14 smart cities. The announcement came amid calls from the opposition YSR Congress Party for a debate on the capital's location. Chief Minister Naidu emphasized that the decision reflects public sentiment, with nearly 50% of representations received by the Sivaramakrishnan Committee favoring the Vijayawada-Guntur region. He also highlighted the need for Central Government support for capital development and special status for the state as assured during the passage of the State Reorganisation Bill.

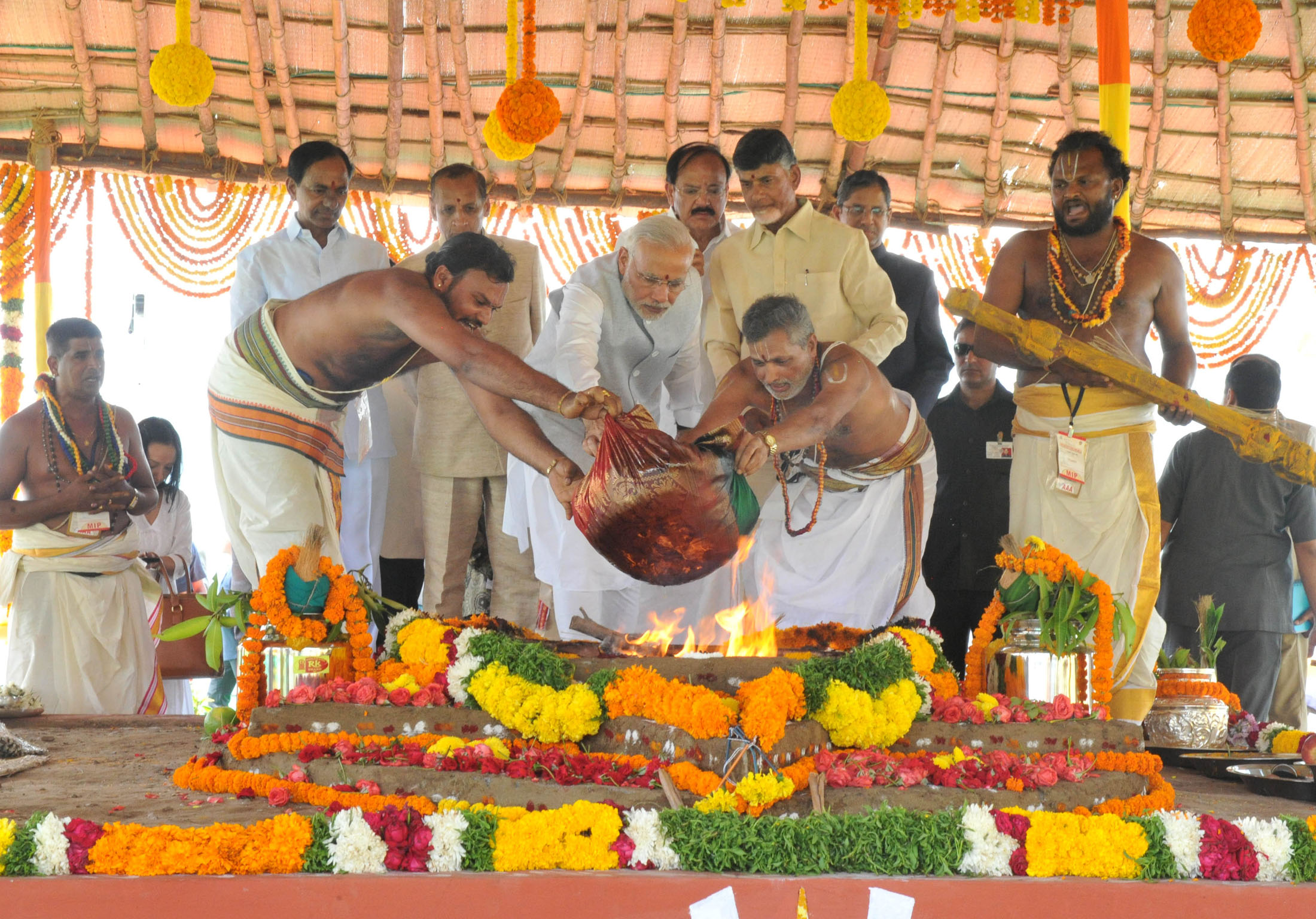
Narendra Modi, PM of India participating in the foundation laying ceremony of Amaravati, with Chandrababu Naidu, CM and ESL Narasimhan, Governor.

On October 22, 2015, following a cabinet meeting where it was unanimously approved, Chief Minister Naidu announced the selection of Amaravathi, an ancient town located on the banks of the Krishna River, as the site for the new capital city. During the foundation-laying ceremony, attended by Prime Minister Narendra Modi, Chief Minister Naidu discussed plans for the capital's development, which aimed to focus on creating an energy-efficient city with industrial hubs. The completion date for the master plan's first phase was set for May 15, 2016, and plans were proposed for a 200-km ring road to connect Amaravati with Vijayawada and Guntur.

The establishment of Amaravati as the new capital of Andhra Pradesh involved a land pooling initiative crucial for its development. Chief Minister N. Chandrababu Naidu's administration implemented the Andhra Pradesh Capital Region Development Authority (APCRDA) Act in 2014, which facilitated the creation of a land bank for the new capital. The Act allowed for voluntary land pooling, enabling landowners to surrender their land in exchange for developed plots and financial compensation. The government aimed to acquire approximately 53,748 acres of land from 27 villages. Around 33,733 acres were pooled through this scheme. While many farmers participated, some, particularly from Penumaka and Undavalli, expressed concerns about compensation rates. The pooling process aggregated small land parcels, which were then improved and partially returned to the original owners. The initiative also included annuity payments for ten years, providing financial support to those who surrendered their land. After fast track completion of interim buildings, government legislature and secretariat started operating from the new facilities at Velagapudi from March 2017.

=== Establishing governance ===
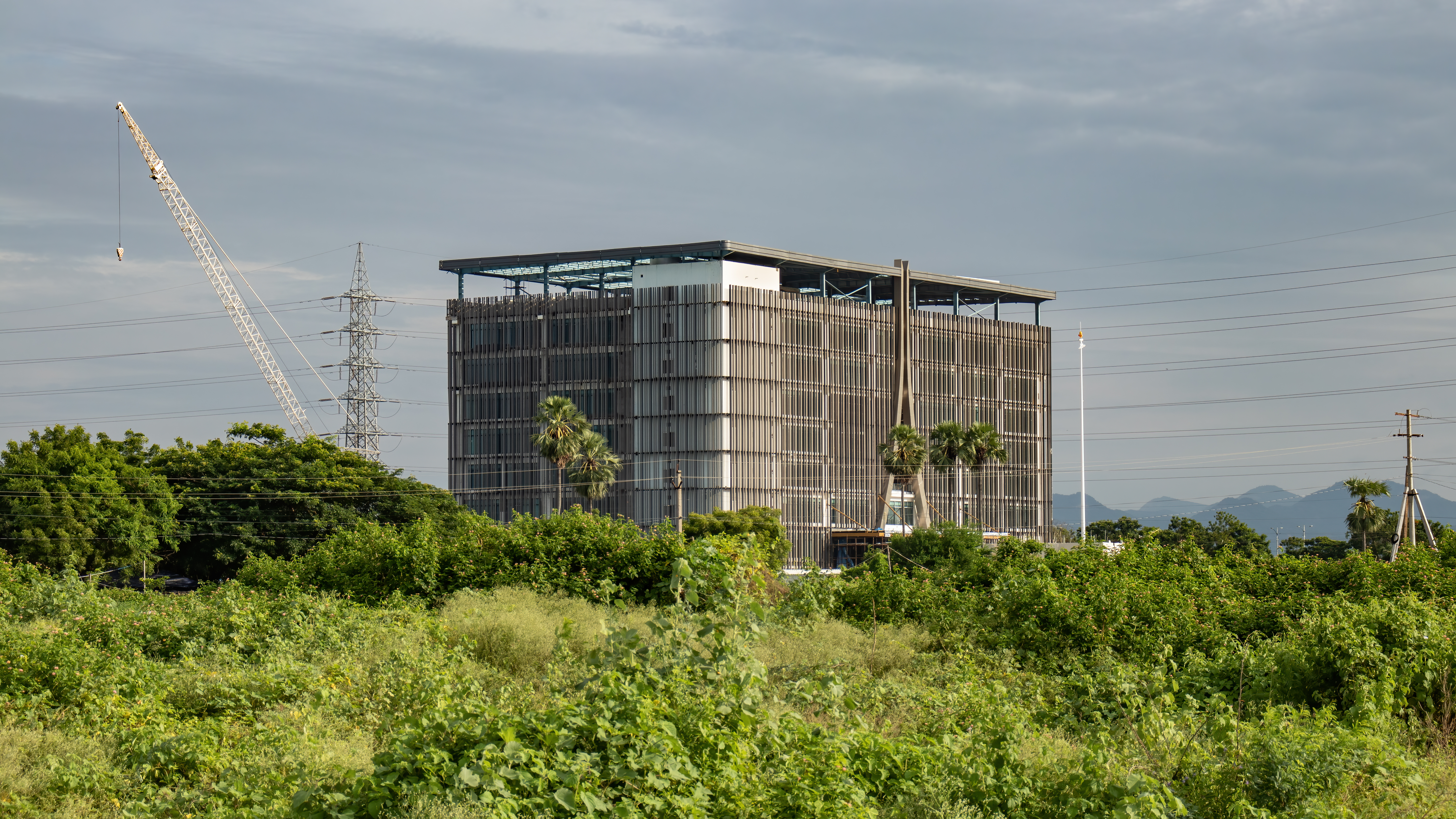
APCRDA office in AGC

The construction of the temporary Andhra Pradesh Secretariat at Velagapudi, 16 km from Vijayawada, was completed on the October 3, 2016 with a budget of ₹230 crores. By October 17, 2016, five of the six planned blocks began operations. The Secretariat, covering 45 acres, is designed in a G-plus-1 style. The first block houses the Chief Minister's Office, while the others accommodate various ministers and the sixth block is intended for the AP Assembly and Legislative Council. The Andhra Pradesh High Court has also moved to a new temporary building in Amaravati, inaugurated by Chief Justice Ranjan Gogoi. This new court complex includes 16 court halls and a 2.70 lakh square feet office space. Advocates have faced challenges due to a lack of necessary facilities in the new building, including poor broadband and library access. Despite initial difficulties, legal professionals remain optimistic about the future of the new high court and capital city.

=== Amaravati protests (2019–2024) ===
Following the 2019 election, the incumbent government led by the Telugu Desam Party lost in a landslide election to the YSR Congress. The newly elected chief minister, Jagan Mohan Reddy, stated that the government was skeptical towards building a new capital city due to financial and viability concerns. Slowly, the government was accused of halting or slowing down progress of ognoing construction works in the city. Later in December 2019, the government formally tabled multiple new bills, which proposed establishing three capital cities in Amaravati, Visakhapatnam and Kurnool, rather than soleley in Amaravati. This decision led to widespread protests, especially from farmers in the Amaravati region who had given land under the earlier capital plan. The issue also became politically and legally contested, with court challenges and a prolonged debate over whether Amaravati should remain the sole capital.

The agitation, led by various farmer and civil groups under the Amaravati Parirakshana Samithi, continued for years through marches, sit-ins, and statewide campaigns demanding that Amaravati remain the sole capital. The dispute escalated legally, with the Andhra Pradesh High Court intervening at different stages and issuing strong directions to maintain status quo and criticizing the government's attempt to shift or abandon Amaravati's development. In 2022, the High Court went further and ruled that the state could not abandon Amaravati as the capital and must continue its development, but the government challenged this in the Supreme Court, leading to a stay and prolonged uncertainty.

Despite the court rulings, the state government under Jagan Mohan Reddy largely maintained its stance of pausing or restructuring the capital plan, and there was little large-scale revival of Amaravati construction during that period. The legal battle continued until 2024, when the Telugu Desam Party led alliance won the election ousting the YSR Congress. After the change in government, the new administration shifted back to supporting Amaravati as the primary capital, and the earlier three-capital approach was effectively abandoned. This culminated in official declarations and policy moves reaffirming Amaravati's capital status, marking a major reversal from the previous government's position.

=== Amaravati drone summit ===
The Amaravati Drone Summit 2024 aimed to position Andhra Pradesh as a hub for drone technology in India. Organized by the Andhra Pradesh Drone Corporation in collaboration with the Ministry of Civil Aviation and the Drone Federation of India, the summit was held on October 22–23 at the CK Convention in Mangalagiri, attracting over 6,900 participants, including industry experts, researchers, and students. The event featured discussions, exhibitions, workshops, and a record-breaking drone show at Punnami Ghat in Vijayawada with over 5,500 drones, setting five Guinness World Records. Focused on fostering innovation, the summit aimed to establish a regulatory framework, attract ₹2,000 crore in investments, generate ₹6,000 crore in revenue, and train over 20,000 youth as drone pilots to create 30,000 jobs.

=== Statutory Capital Status ===
Amaravati was granted permanent statutory status as the sole capital city of Andhra Pradesh following the enactment of the Andhra Pradesh Reorganization (Amendment) Act, 2026. The legislation, passed by both Houses of Parliament during the 2026 Budget session and signed into law by President Droupadi Murmu on April 6, 2026, explicitly amended Section 5(2) of the original Andhra Pradesh Reorganisation Act, 2014 to replace the ambiguous phrase "and there shall be a new capital" with "and Amaravati shall be the new capital".

== Geography ==
The city is located in Guntur district, at the heart of Andhra Pradesh, on the banks of the Krishna River. It lies approximately 15 kilometres (9.3 mi) south-west of Vijayawada, 33 kilometres (21 mi) north of Guntur, and 40 kilometres (25 mi) north-west of Tenali. It is situated about 28 kilometres (17 mi) from the historic site of Amaravati, which served as the capital of the Satavahana Empire and from which the city derives its name.

The city has an area of 217.23 km^{2} and is spread across 25 villages in three mandals (Thullur, Mangalagiri and Tadepalli) of Guntur district. The 25 villages in the Capital City area have about 100,000 population in about 27,000 households. The AP capital region is spread over Guntur, Palnadu, NTR, and Krishna districts and includes Guntur, Vijayawada, and Tenali cities several towns and villages. During winter months, the temperature is between 12 °C and 30 °C. During summer, the temperature is between 17 °C to 45 °C. Climate is very humid in summer with humidity rising up to 68%.

== Demographics ==
=== Population, language and religion ===
Telugu is the native and official language of the region, while English is also widely understood. Hinduism is the majority religion, with minority communities of Buddhists, Christians and Muslims.

== Administration ==
=== Civic administration ===
==== Settlements ====
The table below lists the identified villages and hamlets under their respective mandals, which became a part of the capital city.

Mandal	Settlements
Thullur mandal	Abbarajupalem, Ainavolu, Ananthavaram, Borupalem, Dondapadu, Kondarajupalem (de-populated), Lingayapalem (including Modugulankapalem hamlets), Malkapuram, Mandadam (Tallayapalem hamlets), Nekkallu, Nelapadu, Pitchikalapalem, Rayapudi, Sakhamuru, Thulluru, Uddandarayunipalem, Velagapudi, Venkatapalem
Mangalagiri mandal	Krishnayapalem, Nidamarru, Kuragallu (including Nerukonda hamlets), Nowlur (including Yerrabalem & Bethapudi hamlets)
Tadepalli mandal	Penumaka, Tadepalle (M) (part) (Nulakapet, Dolas Nagar etc.), Undavalli

Notes:

- M – municipality
- The names in brackets are the hamlet villages of the respective settlement.

The administration successfully hosted the inaugural Happy Cities Summit in Amaravati in April 2018. The summit saw the participation of 1,500+ delegates from 15+ countries, including eminent city leaders and urban experts.

=== Police ===
Amaravati falls under the police jurisdiction of Amaravati Capital Region zone headed by DCP. The Amaravati Capital Region zone falls under Guntur Police Commissionerate. There are 2 police sub-divisions within the Amaravati Capital Region zone:

==== Thulluru sub-division ====
- Tadepalli Police Station
- Thulluru Police Station

==== Mangalagiri sub-division ====
- Mangalagiri Town Police Station
- Mangalagiri rural Police Station
- Duggirala Police Station
- Pedakakani Police Station

== Planning ==
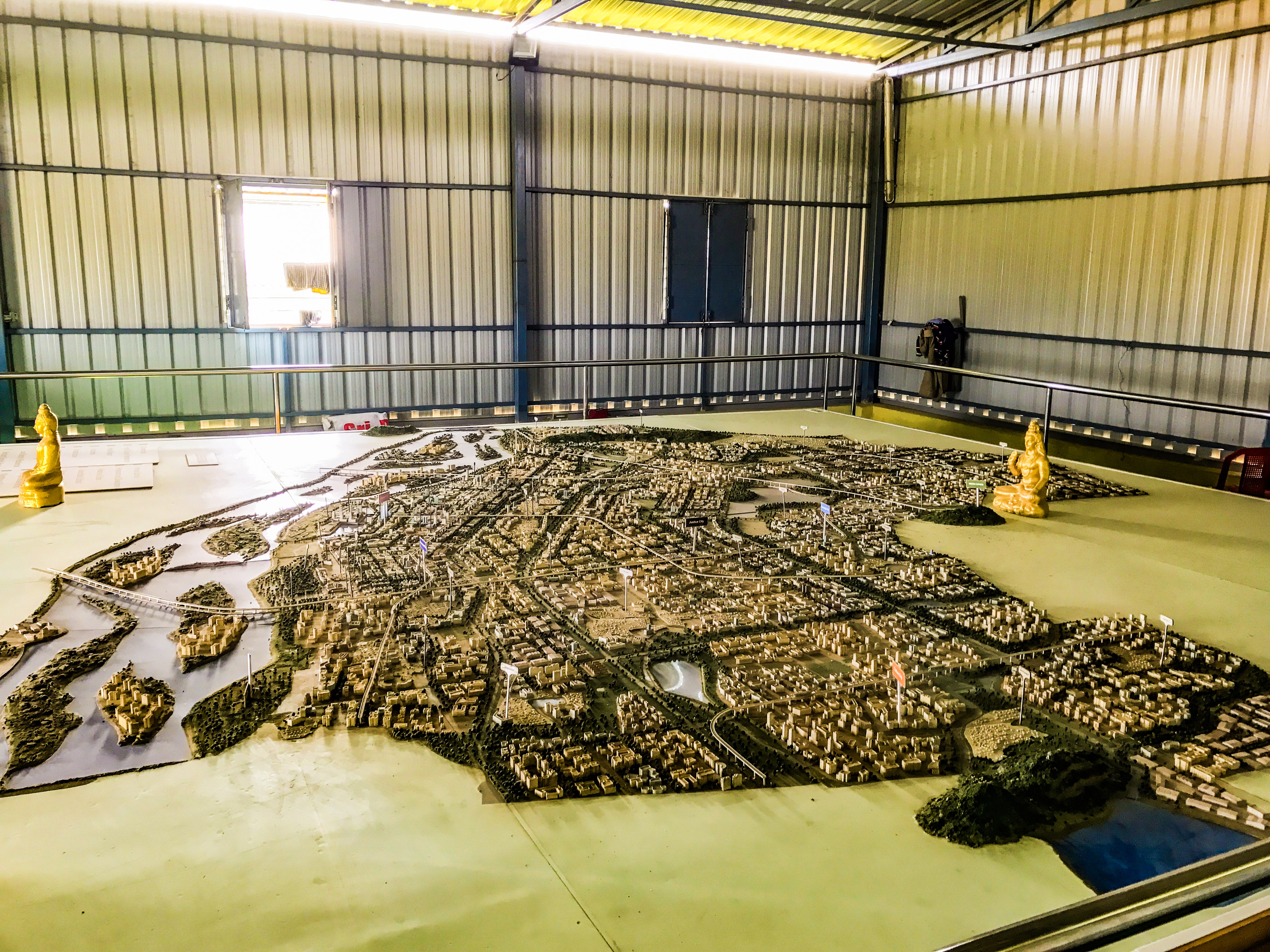
Amaravati 3D sketch map at APCRDA office - looking from NW towards SE corner of the exhibit in this image

Amaravati is planned to be the people-centric pioneer Smart City of India, built around sustainability and livability principles, and to be the happiest city in the world. Among the innovative features on the drawing board are navigation canals around the city, connecting to an island in the Krishna river. The Government envisaged an investment need of US$2–4 billion for the development of the city.

Criticism that the city would require enormous amounts of energy and resources and would destroy precious natural environments and local livelihoods were raised and alternate plans were proposed.

The city is planned to have 51% green space and 10% of water bodies. It is being modeled on Singapore, with the master plan being prepared by two Singapore government-appointed consultants.

The city construction had a budget of ₹ 553.43 billions out of which state government contribution is only ₹ 126 billion. Government raised money through bonds. The contribution from the government is to be repaid by the CRDA after 2037. Ultimately state or union governments are not incurring any expenditure to construct the city but wholly financed by the income accrued from the sale of land for various development schemes (₹ 171.51 billion), loans and the local taxes (₹ 146.41 billion by 2037) to the CRDA. The state and union governments are expected to earn ₹ 120 billion per annum out of which state goods and services tax (State GST) alone is ₹ 60 billion per annum. The entire city construction is planned by self-financing from loans and land selling with the state government's moral support. CRDA is expecting a net surplus income of ₹ 333 billion by 2037 after meeting the total expenditure on the city. Amaravati government complex which is intended to provide world-class facilities needed for the state government. The bus rapid transit system (BRTS) in Amaravati to connect with the adjacent Vijayawada and Guntur cities by world-class road network is also part of the CRDA project. Both Amaravati government complex and BRTS are planned with an expenditure of ₹ 140 billion.

Nine themed cities consisting of finance, justice, health, sports, media, and electronics were planned. Several business groups and institutions like Reliance Group, NRDC-India. Pi Data Centre, HCL Technologies, and BRS Medicity proposed to invest in the city.

The government explored other means of mass transport like monorail, Bus Rapid Transit System (BRTS) and tramways. Two new depots, North and South depots of the APSRTC are proposed to be constructed. A proposed Amaravati high-speed circular railway line would connect the city with the nearby cities of Vijayawada, Guntur and Tenali, extending up to a length of 105 km (65 mi) with an estimated cost of ₹10,000 crore (US$1.1 billion). A metro rail project is proposed between the cities of Tenali, Guntur, and Vijayawada with 100 km circular corridor.

== Construction ==
=== Government and public infrastructure ===
Landmarks in Amaravati (Interactive map)

The state government originally engaged the Singapore-based Ascendas-Singbridge and Sembcorp Development consortium for the city's construction. The city's infrastructure was to be developed in 7–8 years in phases, at an estimated cost of ₹33,000 crore. ₹7,500 crore from the Housing and Urban Development Corporation (HUDCO), $500 million from the World Bank and ₹2,500 crore from the Indian Government, of which ₹1,500 crore has been granted. With the change of priorities for the government that came into power in 2019, the Amaravati project has substantially slowed, with no completion deadline in sight.

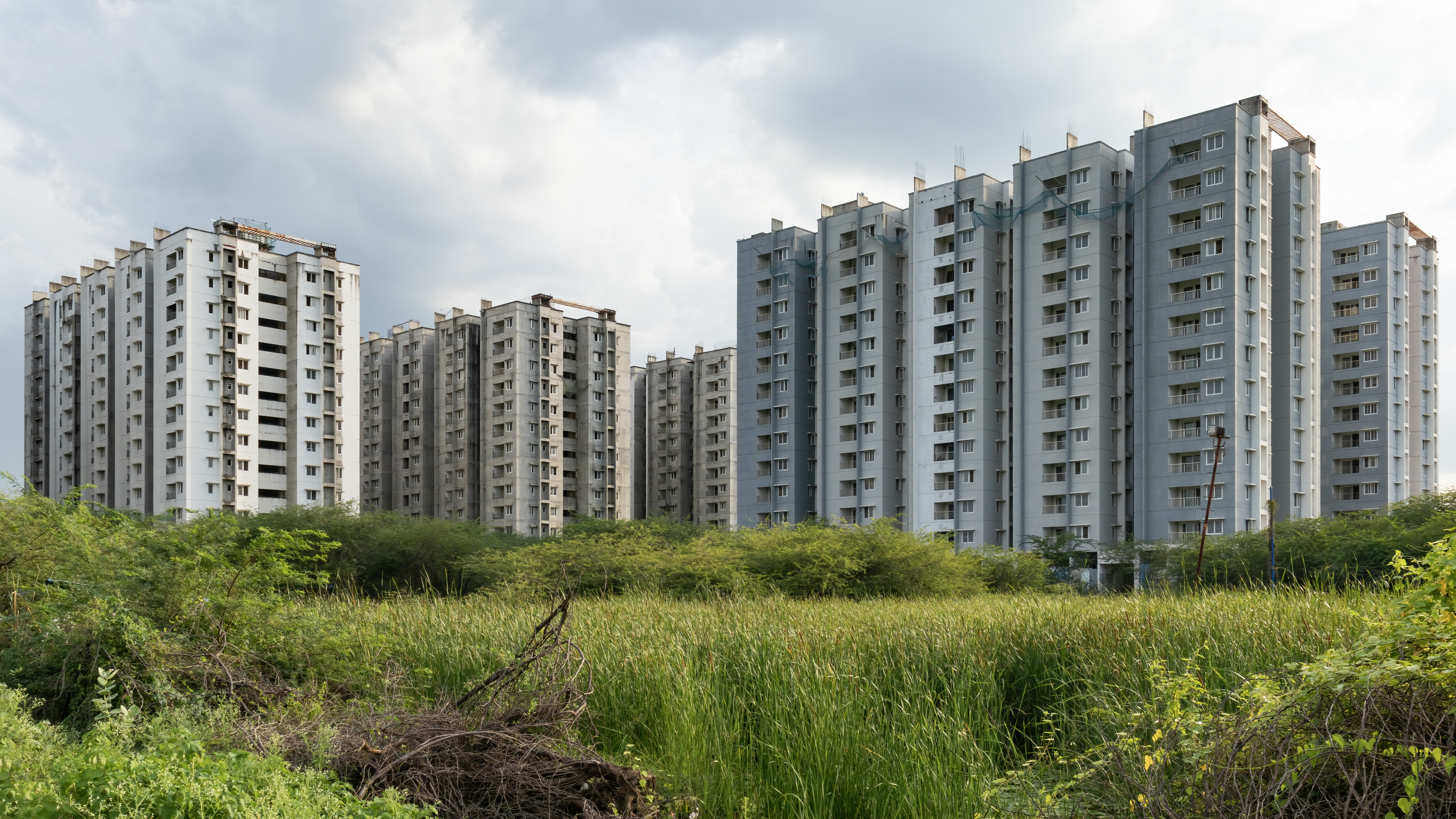
Group-D officers buildings

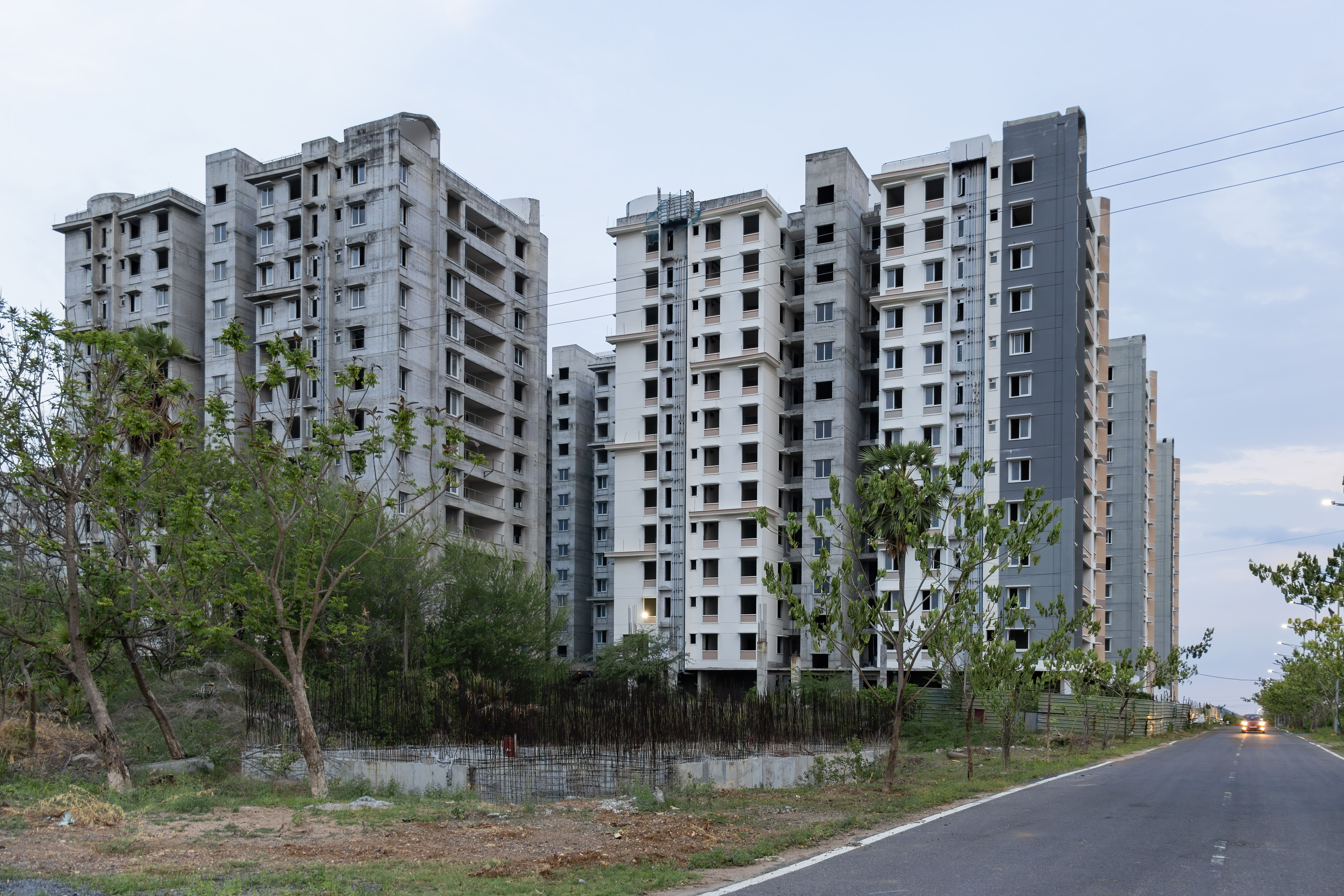
MLA Housing Complex at Rayapudi

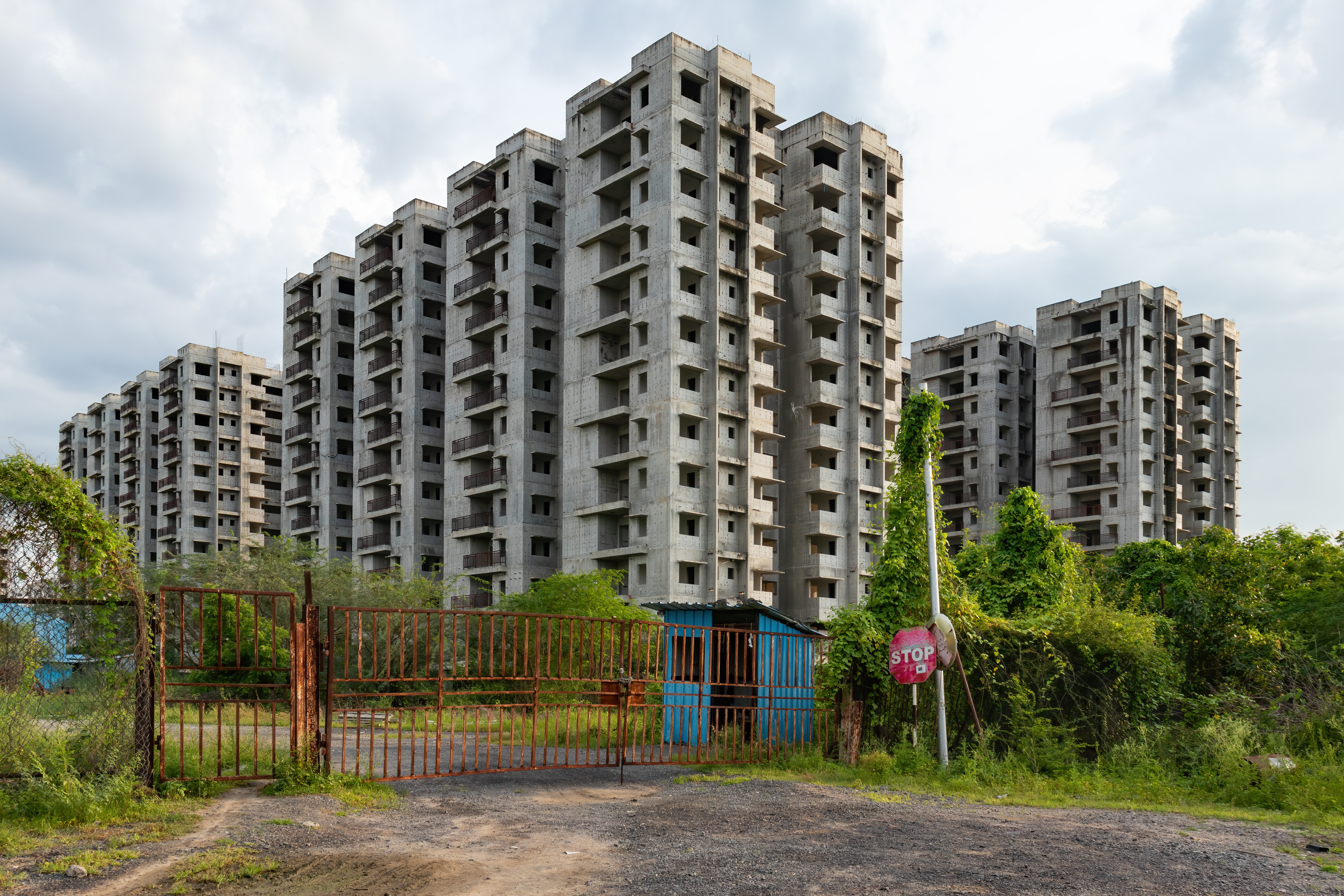
NGO housing

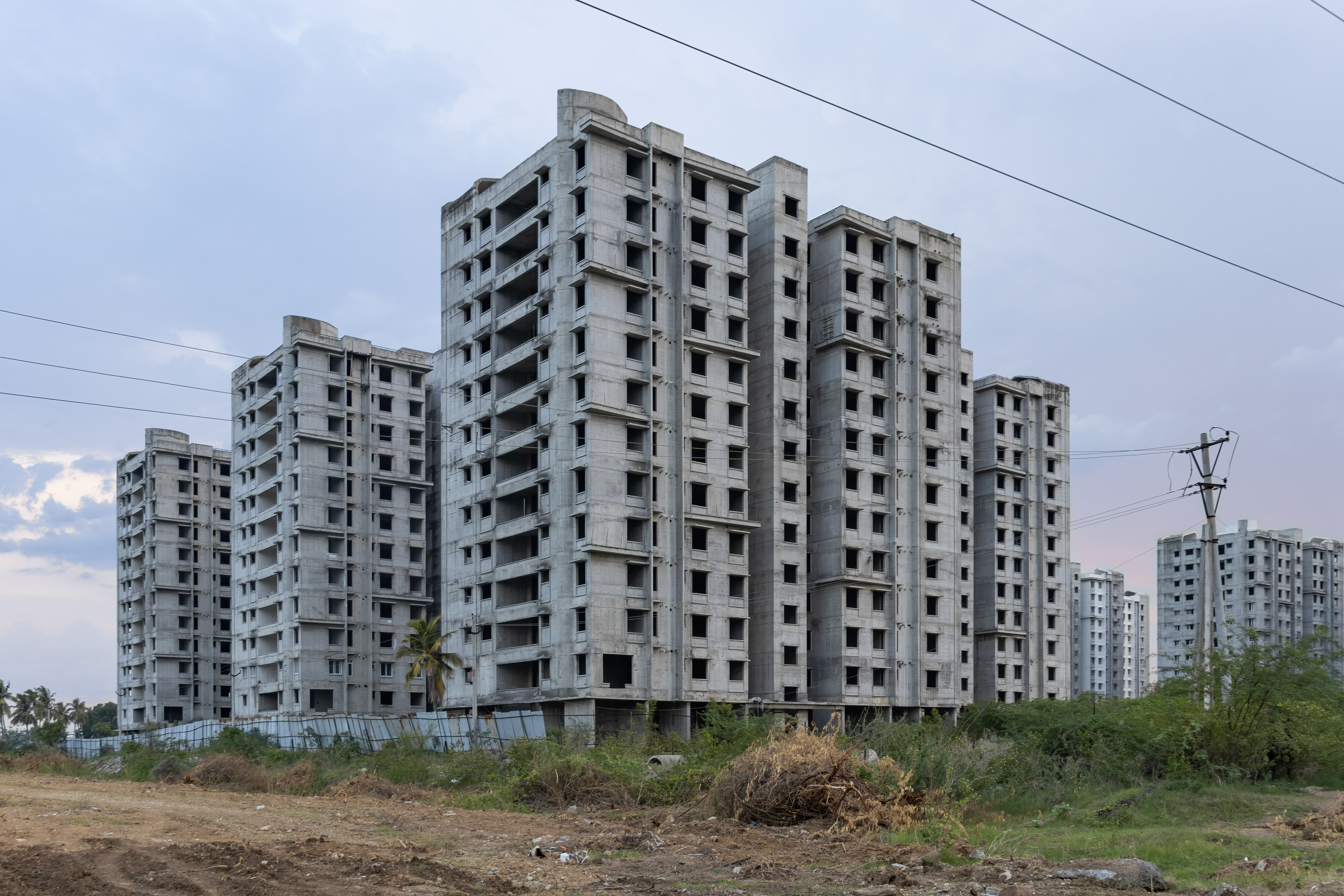
MLC Housing Complex at Rayapudi

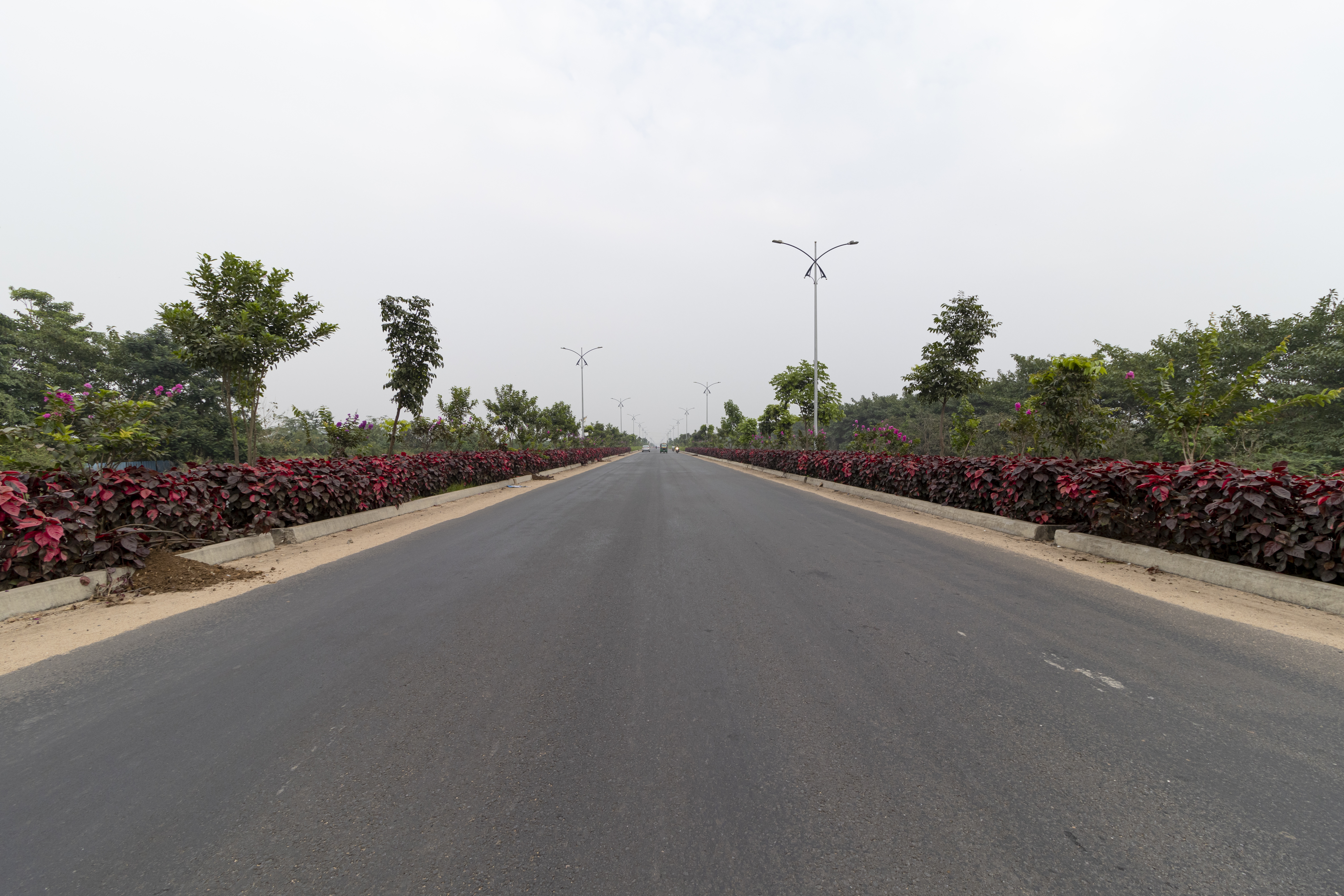
Amaravati Seed Access Road

=== Water bodies ===
The masterplan of Amaravati includes reservoir network. The proposed reservoirs are Neerukonda reservoir, Krishnayapalem reservoir, Sakhamuru reservoir, Lam reservoir, Pedaparimi reservoir and Vaikuntapuram reservoir. The construction of the reservoirs is planned in phases. Neerukonda reservoir with a capacity of 0.4 TMC is currently being built in Amaravati at a cost of 487 crore INR. Krishnayapalem reservoir and Sakhamuru reservoir are currently under construction.

== Economy ==
The agrarian economy is transformed into an urban economy with the formation of capital city. Future developments include the Quantum Valley Tech Park, set for 2026, which will host IBM, TCS, and IIT Madras to develop India's largest quantum computer. The city is being developed with specialised urban nodes such as Justice City, Knowledge City, Health City, and Finance City, each designed to support key sectors like law, tourism, education, healthcare, and finance. These sub-cities aim to diversify the regional economy, foster innovation, and position Amaravati as a leading smart city and IT powerhouse.

== Education ==
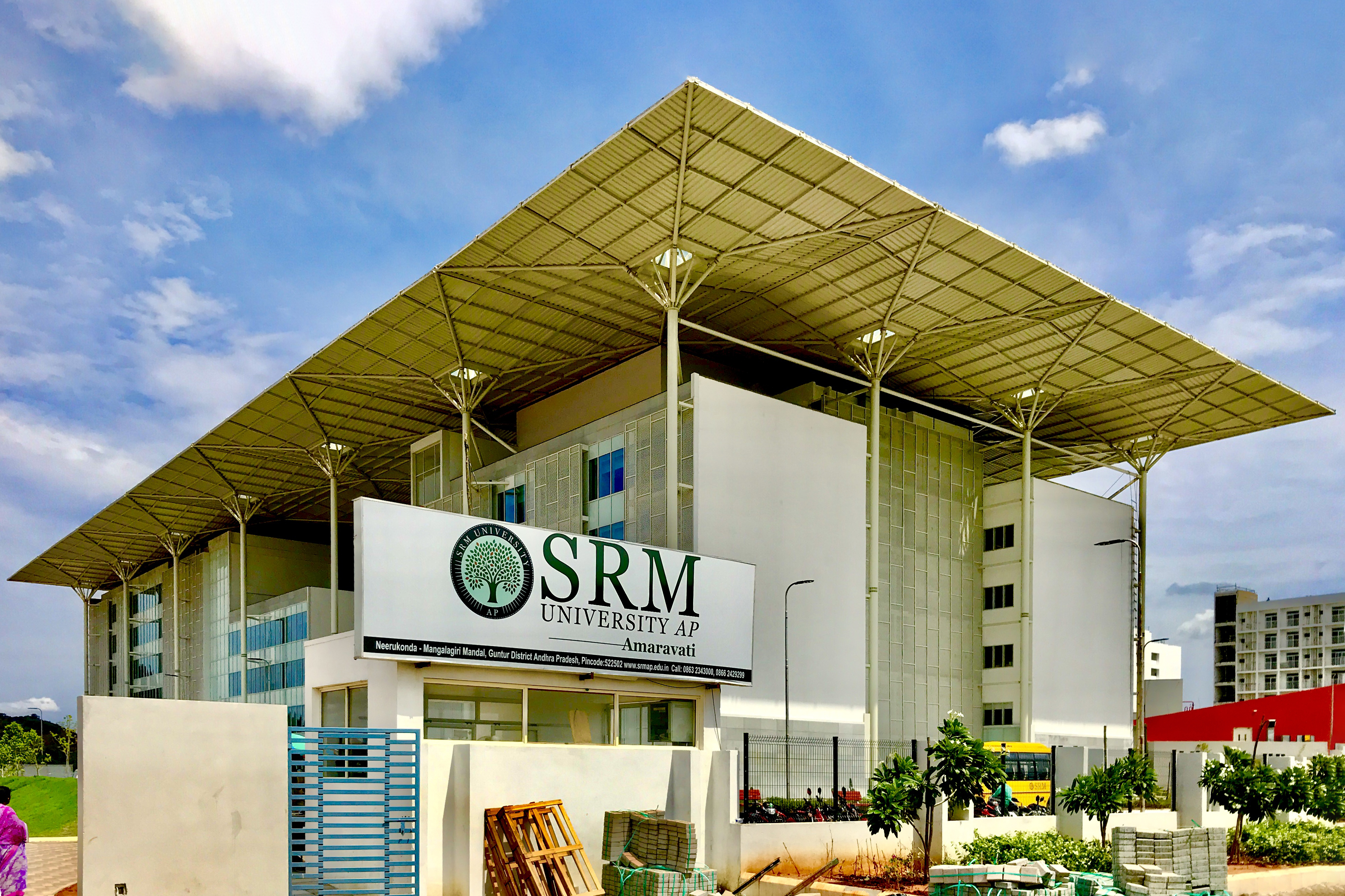
SRM University- Amaravati

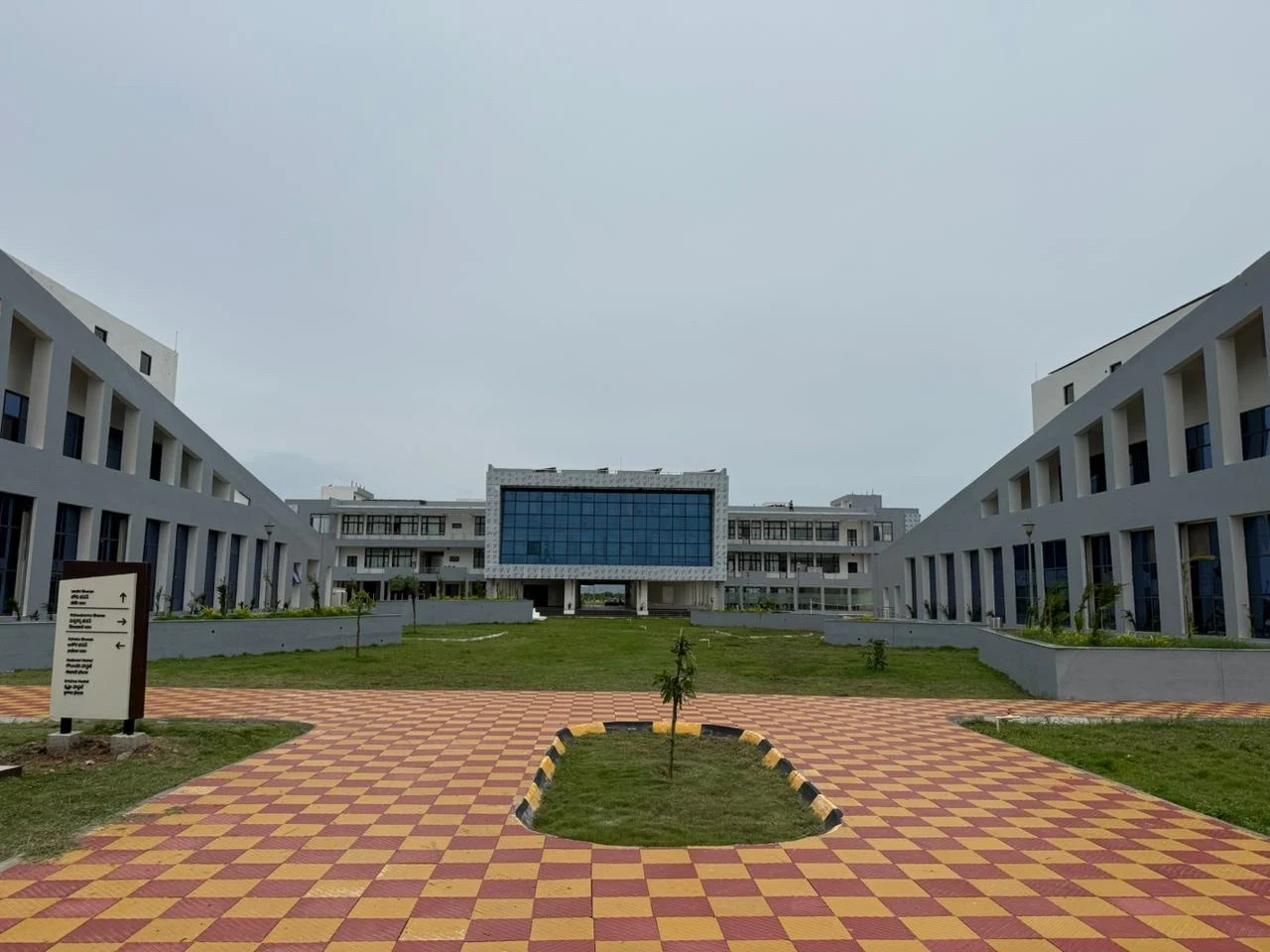
NID Amaravati

National Institute of Design, SRM University, Andhra Pradesh, Vellore Institute of Technology, Andhra Pradesh, Amrita University, BITS Pilani, AIIMS Mangalagiri are among others to set up campus in Amaravati. In 2018, the city's first management institute, XLRI – Xavier School of Management, was under construction near Ainavolu.

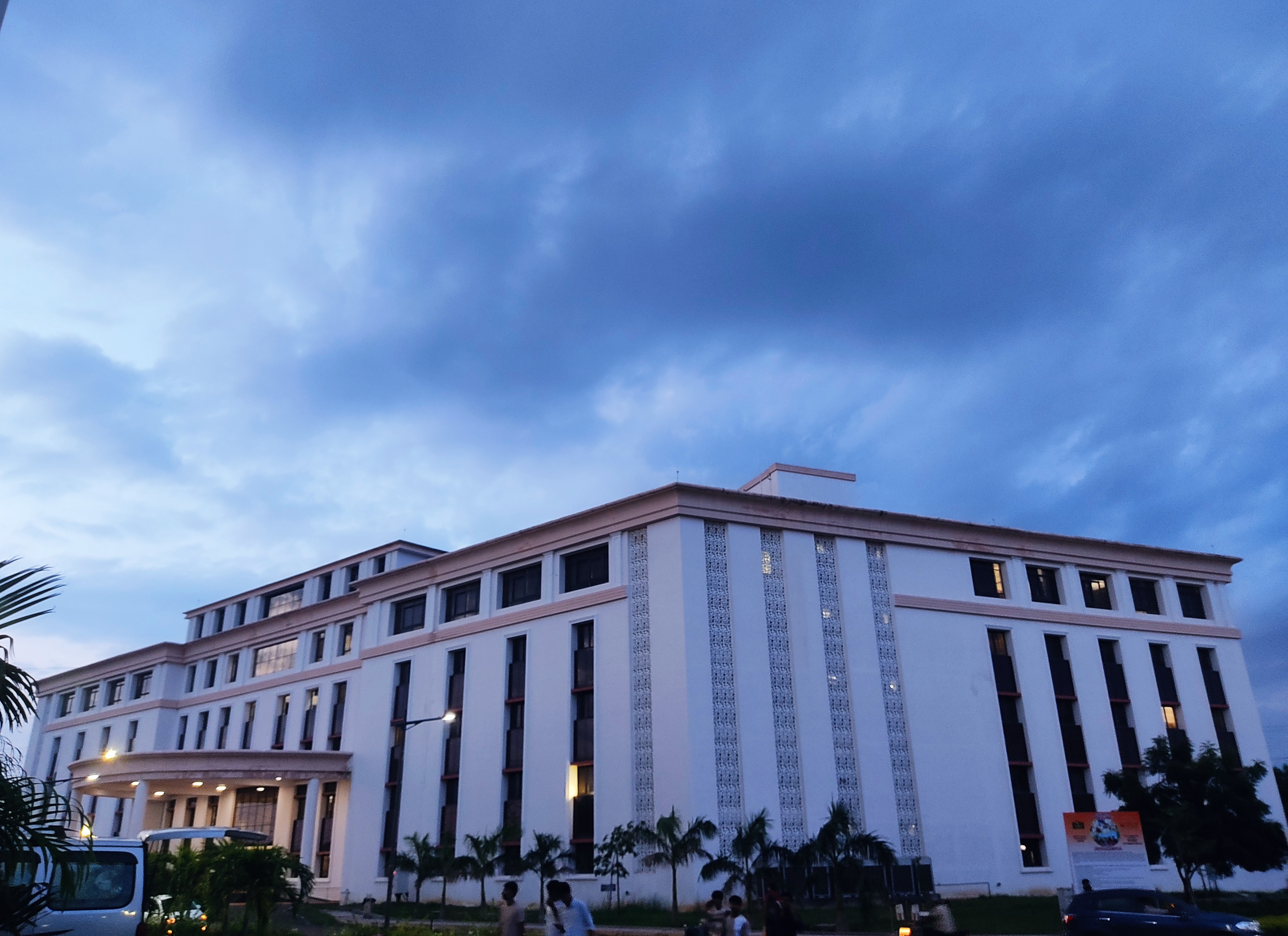
VIT University- Amaravati

== Tourism ==
Nearby religious sites include the Amaralingeswara Swamy Temple, and the Amaravati stupa in the Amaravati heritage complex, Dhyana Buddha statue and Undavalli Caves.

== Transport ==
=== Roads ===
The Amaravati Outer Ring Road is under construction, it is 195.13 kilometer six line ring road expressway along with two lane service roads encircling Andhra Pradesh Capital Region Development Authority (APCRDA) spread over Palnadu, NTR, Eluru, Guntur and Krishna districts. Guntur-Tenali-Vuyyuru-Amaravati urban alignment. It is being built by the National Highways Authority of India under Phase–VII of National Highways Development Project.

The Amaravati Seed Capital Road is an arterial road under construction to access the core capital area from NH16. The Vijayawada-Amaravati road connects the city with Vijayawada. The Government of Andhra Pradesh is planning to construct a 320 m (1,050 ft) long cable bridge as part of the third phase of the Seed Access Road project in Amaravati. This phase includes a 3.5 km (2.2 mi) stretch from Prakasam Barrage to Manipal Hospital, which will connect the Seed Access Road to National Highway 16 at Kanakadurga Varadhi. The project was delayed due to land acquisition / pooling issues in Undavalli village between 2014 and 2019, but negotiations have recently resumed under the Capital Region Development Authority (CRDA) to begin work, with an estimated budget of ₹593.03 crore.

NH544D connects Anantapur-Guntur instead of the previously proposed Amaravati–Anantapur Expressway. Andhra Pradesh State Road Transport Corporation (APSRTC) operates buses connecting the city with Vijayawada, Guntur, and Tenali. Auto rickshaws also operate for shorter distances in the capital city area. The Bengaluru–Vijayawada Expressway, also known as Bengaluru–Kadapa-Vijayawada (BKV) Expressway and classified as NH-544G, is an under-construction 518 km (322 mi)-long, six-lane access-controlled expressway between the cities of Bengaluru, the capital of Karnataka, and Vijayawada, the second-largest city of Andhra Pradesh. This Expressway mostly passes in Andhra Pradesh State and connects the farthest industrial town Hindupur in Andhra Pradesh to its capital Amaravati.

=== Railways ===
The nearest railway stations are Krishna Canal at Tadepalli and Guntur, Vijayawada. However, there are plans to construct an Errupalem–Amaravati–Namburu railway line which connects Amaravati with Guntur–Krishna Canal section there by connecting with other parts of the state and country.

=== Air ===
Vijayawada International Airport serves the whole Andhra Pradesh Capital Region.

A greenfield international Amaravati International Airport is planned at Amaravati and the DPR is sent for financial appraisal at this stage.

== Sports ==
=== F1H2O Grand Prix of India ===
From 16 to 18 November in 2018, Amaravati hosted the second F1H2O World championship Grand Prix ever held in India. The event brought wide media attention especially after one of the teams took the color and the name of the state, making it the first Indian branded team in the history of F1H2O.

== In popular culture ==
The film Raajadhani Files was inspired by the events around Amaravati.

== See also ==
- 2019–2024 Amaravati protests
- Andhra Pradesh Capital Region
