= Pandit Nehru Bus Station =

Bus station in Vijayawada, India

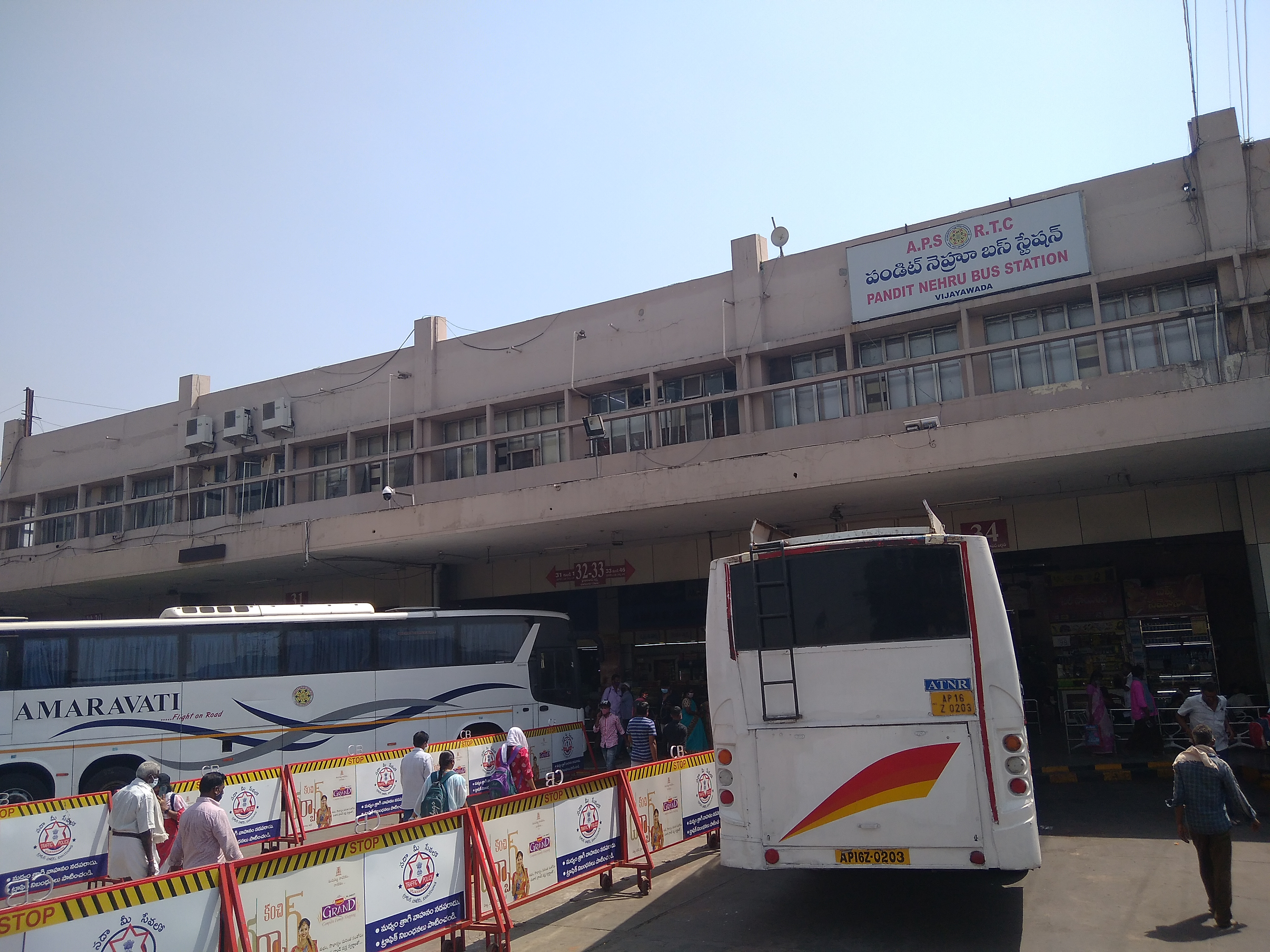
- View of PNBS

General information
- Location: NH-65, Arrival Block, Krishna Lanka, Vijayawada, Andhra Pradesh 520001; India
- Coordinates: 16°30′32″N 80°36′56″E
- System: Passenger Transportation
- Owner: Andhra Pradesh State Road Transport Corporation
- Platforms: 61

Construction
- Parking: Yes

Other information
- Station code: VJA

History
- Opened: 23 September 1990
Location
- Location within Andhra Pradesh Location within India

The Pandit Nehru Bus Station (PNBS), also known as the Telugu Satavahana Prayana Pranganam, is a bus station in Vijayawada, Andhra Pradesh, India situated on the southern side of the city, adjacent to the Krishna River. It is owned by the Andhra Pradesh State Road Transport Corporation (APSRTC) and serves as a key transportation hub for the region.

Spanning an area of 28 acres, PNBS is one of the largest bus stations in India. It ranks behind the Mofussil Bus Terminus in Chennai (36.5 acres) but ahead of the Mahatma Gandhi Bus Station in Hyderabad (20 acres). The station is designed with four main blocks: the departure terminal, which has 48 platforms; the arrival terminal, with 12 platforms; the RTC House, which serves as the administrative headquarters for APSRTC; and the City Bus Port, which caters to city buses.

PNBS has four entrances, allowing for easy access from different directions. The north side leads to the City Bus Port, the east side provides the main entrance, and there are two entrances on the south side, located in front of National Highway 65 in Krishnalanka.

== Administration ==
The bus station has an administrative block named 'RTC House', which is the headquarters of APSRTC.

== Platforms ==
Platforms	Buses
1	Gannavaram, Eluru
2	Hanuman Junctuon, Jangareddygudem
3	Eluru (NON-STOP Buses)
4,5	Tanuku, Ravulapalem, Amalapuram, Kakinada
6, 7	Rajamahendravaram, Visakhapatnam
8	Visakhapatnam, Vizianagaram, Srikakulam
9, 10	Narasaraopet, Chilakaluripeta, Chirala, Vinukonda, Piduguralla, Macherla
11,12	Guntur (AC NON-STOP Buses)
13,14	Guntur (NON-STOP Buses, Express Buses), Srisailam
15,16	Ongole, Kanigiri, Nellore
17, 18	Tirupati, Bengaluru, Chennai
19, 20	Gudivada (NON-STOP Buses, Pallevelugu Buses)
21, 22	Machilipatnam (NON-STOP Buses, Pallevelugu Buses)
23, 24	Kaikaluru, Kalidindi, Bhimavaram (AC Buses, Express Buses)
25, 26	Vuyyuru, Avanigadda, Nagayalanka
27, 28	Allagadda, Kurnool, Adoni
29, 30	Kurnool, Adoni, Kadapa, Anantapur, Hindupur
31	Hyderabad, Chennai, Bengaluru (GARUDA A.C Buses)
32, 33	Hyderabad, Bangalore, Chennai (GARUDA A.C Buses)
34	Hyderabad, Suryapet, Kodad (Super Luxury Buses)
35, 36	Hyderabad, Suryapet, Kodad (Super Luxury Buses)
37	Hyderabad, Suryapet, Kodad (Super Luxury Buses)
38, 39	Hyderabad, Suryapet, Kodad (Super Luxury Buses)
40, 41	Penuganchiprolu, Jaggayyapeta
42	Madhira, Khammam, Nalgonda
43	Andhra Pradesh Secretariat, Andhra Pradesh High Court, Amaravathi
44	Andhra Pradesh Secretariat, Andhra Pradesh High Court, Amaravathi
45	Tiruvuru
46	Bhadrachalam, Manuguru, Konta, Jagdalpur, Hanumakonda, Karimnagar, Adilabad
47	Mangalagiri, Nutakki
48, 49	Guntur (Amaravati, sachivalayam, High court Pallevelugu Buses)
50	Tenali, Repalle (Pallevelugu Buses)
51, 52	Tenali (NON-STOP Buses)
53 to 61	Arrival

== Structure and services ==
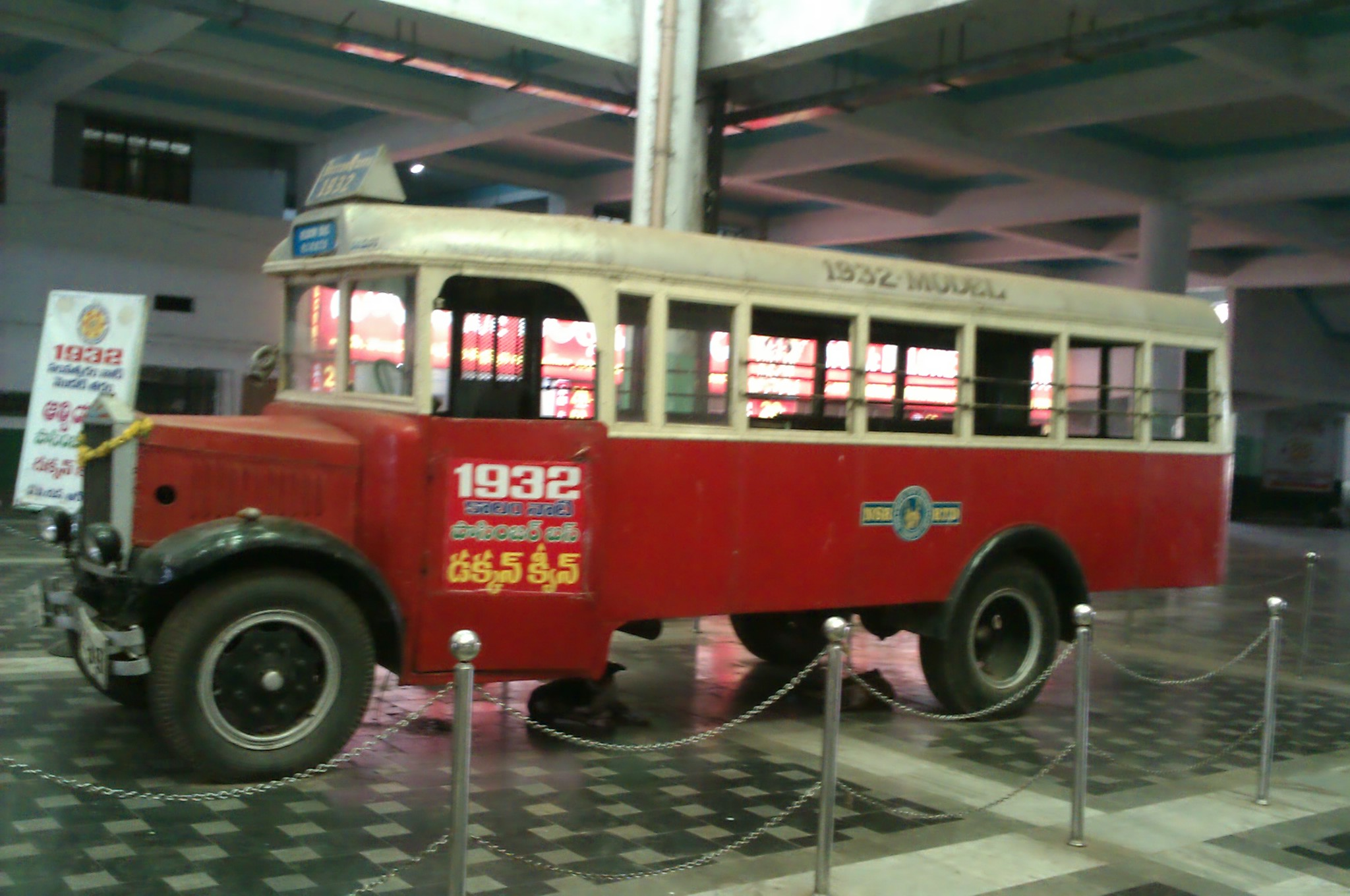
The Deccan Queen bus at Vijayawada bus station

The Deccan Queen of the Nizam State Railways - Road Transport Division is one of the notable features of the station. This bus stand is associated with a city bus station adjacent to it. This bus stand operates city buses in and outside of the city. The station operates buses to major destinations of the state and to neighbouring states like Telangana, Tamil Nadu, Karnataka, Odisha and Chhattisgarh. Amaravati, Deluxe, Telugu Velugu, Express, Garuda, Garuda Plus, Indra, Super Luxury and Vennela are the fleets of buses operated from the station by the APSRTC. Palle velugu, Express, Deluxe, Super Luxury, Rajadhani A/C, Vajra A/C, Garuda, Garuda Plus are some of buses operated by TSRTC. The station provides amenities such as miniplex, ticket-vending and kiosks for passengers, and has a city bus port for local passengers.

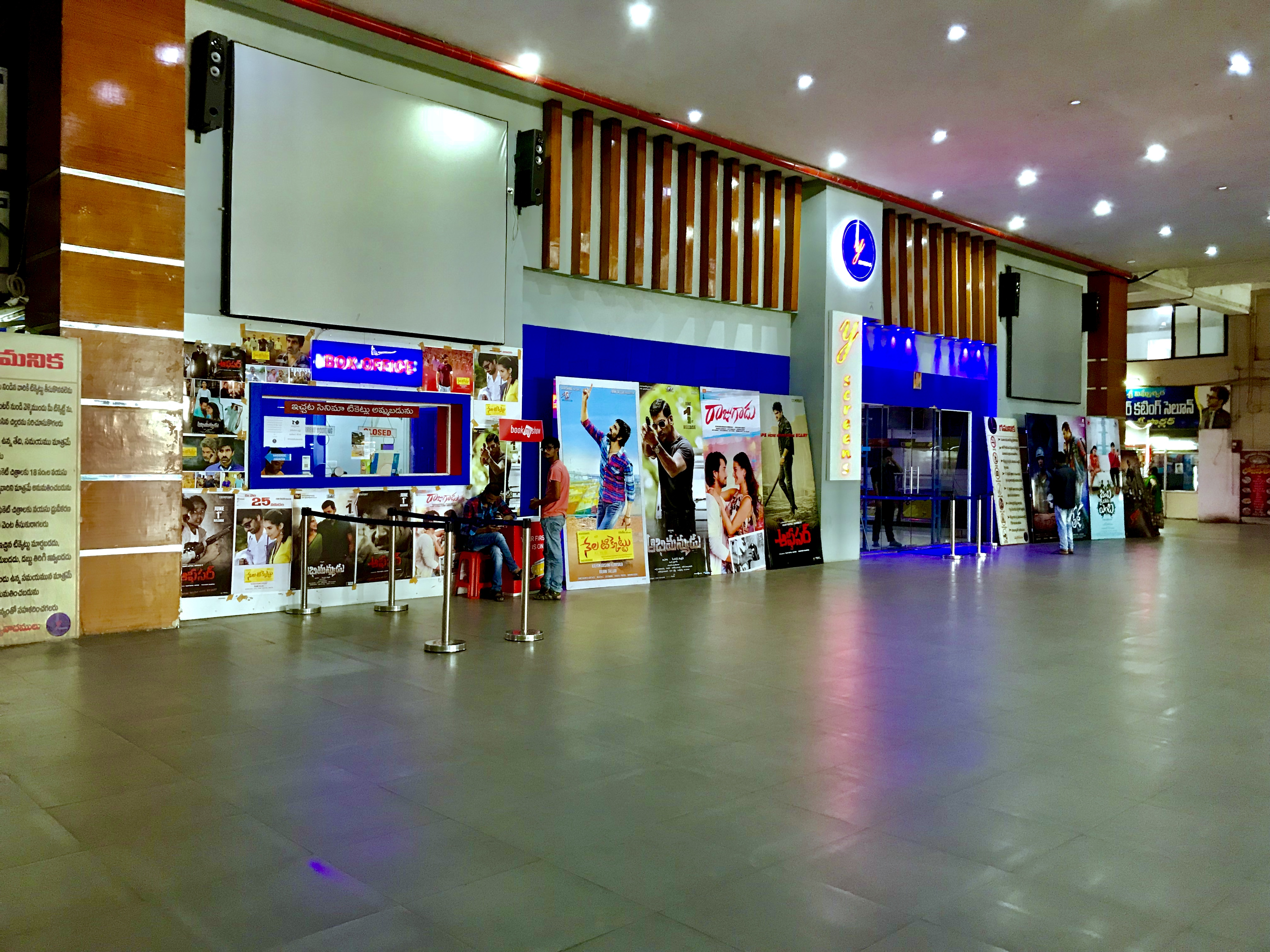
Miniplex in Arrival block

== Vijayawada city bus port ==
The Vijayawada City Bus Port, formerly Vijayawada City Terminal, is situated to the north of the Pandit Nehru Bus Station. Built in 1990, it is a bus station that caters the city bus services. The bus station has 10 platforms and an office for city bus related information.

=== Services ===
- City Ordinary - These city buses are the cheapest mode of transport in the city and connect the city with its suburbs, exurbs and rural areas.
- Metro Express and Metro Deluxe - These city buses operate as superfast services on trunk routes connecting the important centres of the city with its suburbs, exurbs and rural areas.
- Metro Deluxe AC and Metro Luxury AC - These buses connect the city with the Vijayawada International Airport and the city of Guntur.
