= Mahatma Gandhi Bus Station =

Bus depot in India

Mahatma Gandhi Bus Station Imlibun Bus Station Mahaatma Gaandhee Bas Steshan Imaleebun Bas Steshan
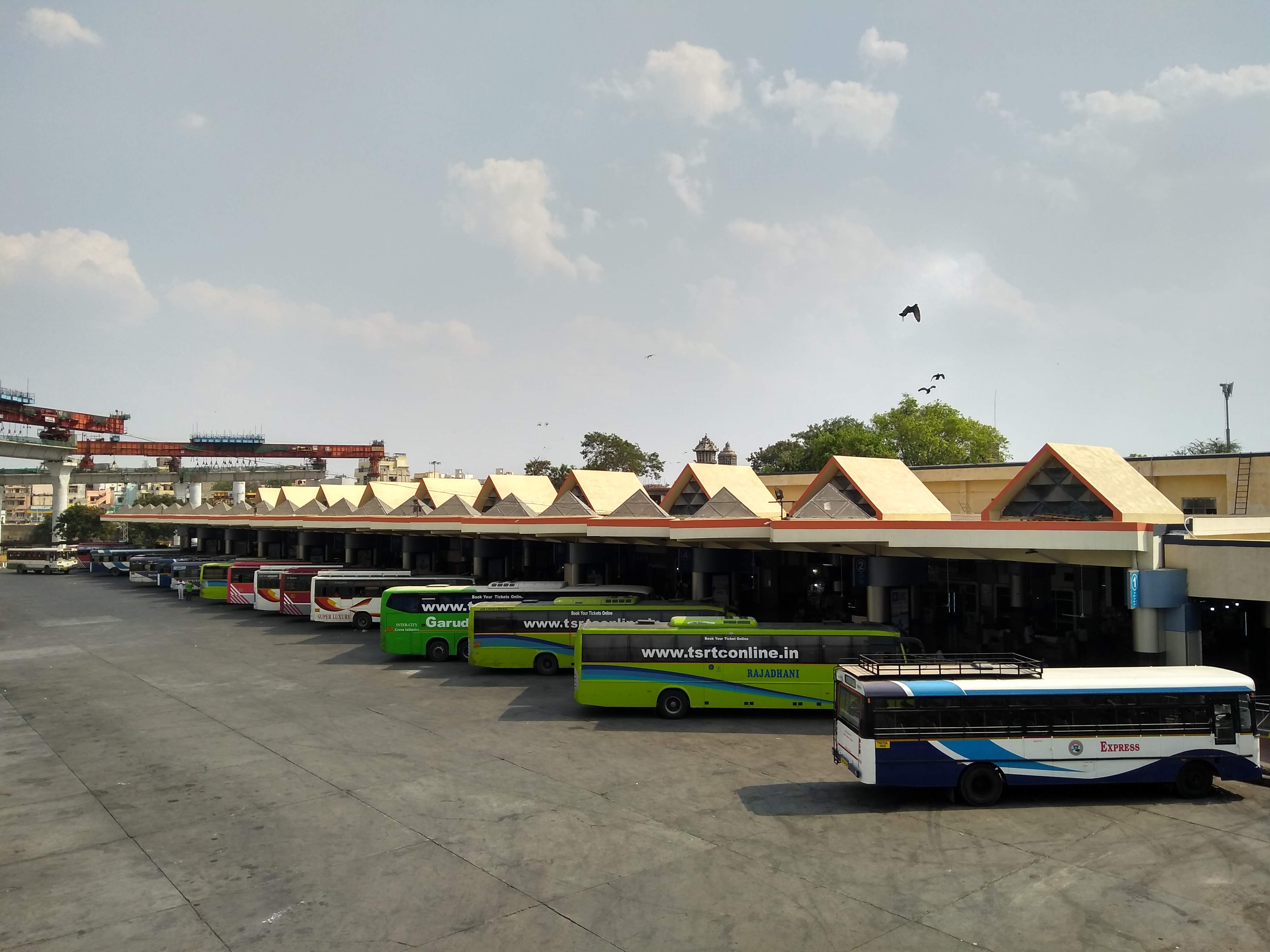
- Mahatma Gandhi Bus Station

General information
- Other names: Central Bus Station; Imlibun Bus Station
- Location: Gowliguda, Hyderabad, Telangana; India
- Coordinates: 17.378°N 78.484°E
- Owner: TGSRTC
- Platforms: 79
- Connections: Red Line Green Line MG Bus Station

Construction
- Parking: Yes
- Cycle facilities: Yes
- Accessible: yes

History
- Opened: 1930s
- Rebuilt: 1994
Location

The Mahatma Gandhi Bus Station (MGBS), also known as the Imlibun Bus Station (Imlibun means "grove of tamarind trees"), is a bus station on the Musi River in the Imlibun area of southern Hyderabad, India. It is owned by the Telangana State Road Transport Corporation (TGSRTC) and is India's fifth-largest bus station, covering 20 acres (81,000 m^{2}), behind Chennai Mofussil Bus Terminus, Bengaluru's Kempegowda Bus Station, Vijayawada's Pandit Nehru Bus Station and Delhi's Millennium Park Bus Depot.

== History ==
The bus station was first built during the Nizam era, and was owned by the Nizam's Guaranteed State Railway and known as the Central Bus Station. It was built in the shape of a dome and was named Imlibun. It was a converted aircraft hangar, built during the 1930s by Butler and Company of the US to accommodate the Nizam's fleet of public single- and double-decker buses.

In 1994, the Central Bus Stand was expanded and the present MGBS was built. The Musi river bed was partially filled for the new facility. 18 acres of Imlibun island was leased by GHMC to APSRTC for 99 years.The original bus stand was built with the "Misssisipi" hangar few metres away from Musi in 1953. After MGBS was built, the Central Bus Station was shifted to the new structure on the Imlibun island. Although it used to be accessible by two major and two minor road bridges, it is presently accessible by four road bridges and two metro lines.

The bus hangars which were also known as "Mississippi aircraft hangar" built in 1930s during the Nizam era collapsed in 2018.

== Service ==
MGBS primarily serves Telangana and Andhra Pradesh, and has daily service to Chhattisgarh, Karnataka, Madhya Pradesh, Odisha, Maharashtra and Tamil Nadu.

== Hyderabad Metro connectivity ==
The MGBS is connected to the city by the Hyderabad Metro's red and green lines, with a interlink station named "MG Bus" providing direct access to and from the Bus Terminus to the Metro station. Jubilee Bus Station (JBS), is also connected by the Hyderabad Metro's green Line while also connecting Secunderabad and Hyderabad. Travel time between the cities is 16 minutes, compared to 45 minutes by road. The MG Bus station is India's largest metro station and Hyderabad's tallest; its corridors – Corridor 2 - Green (JBS to MGBS) and Corridor 1 - Red (Miyapur to LB Nagar) – are on separate levels. According to the metro company, the station is designed for 100 years of service and its concourse will contain retail stores and entertainment.

== Infrastructure ==
The MGBS covers 20 acres (81,000 m^{2}) of a 8-hectare (80,000 m^{2}) complex, and was completed at a cost of ₹13 crore. There are 150 platforms, a 7,380-square-meter waiting room, a 3,455-square-metre shopping complex and a 5,000-square-metre parking area.

Many TGSRTC buses in Hyderabad use the station, one of two terminals in the city for long-distance bus service. Corporation buses include Palle Velugu, Express, Deluxe, Super Luxury, Rajadhani A/C, Garuda, Garuda Plus and Vennela A/C Sleeper.

== Platforms ==
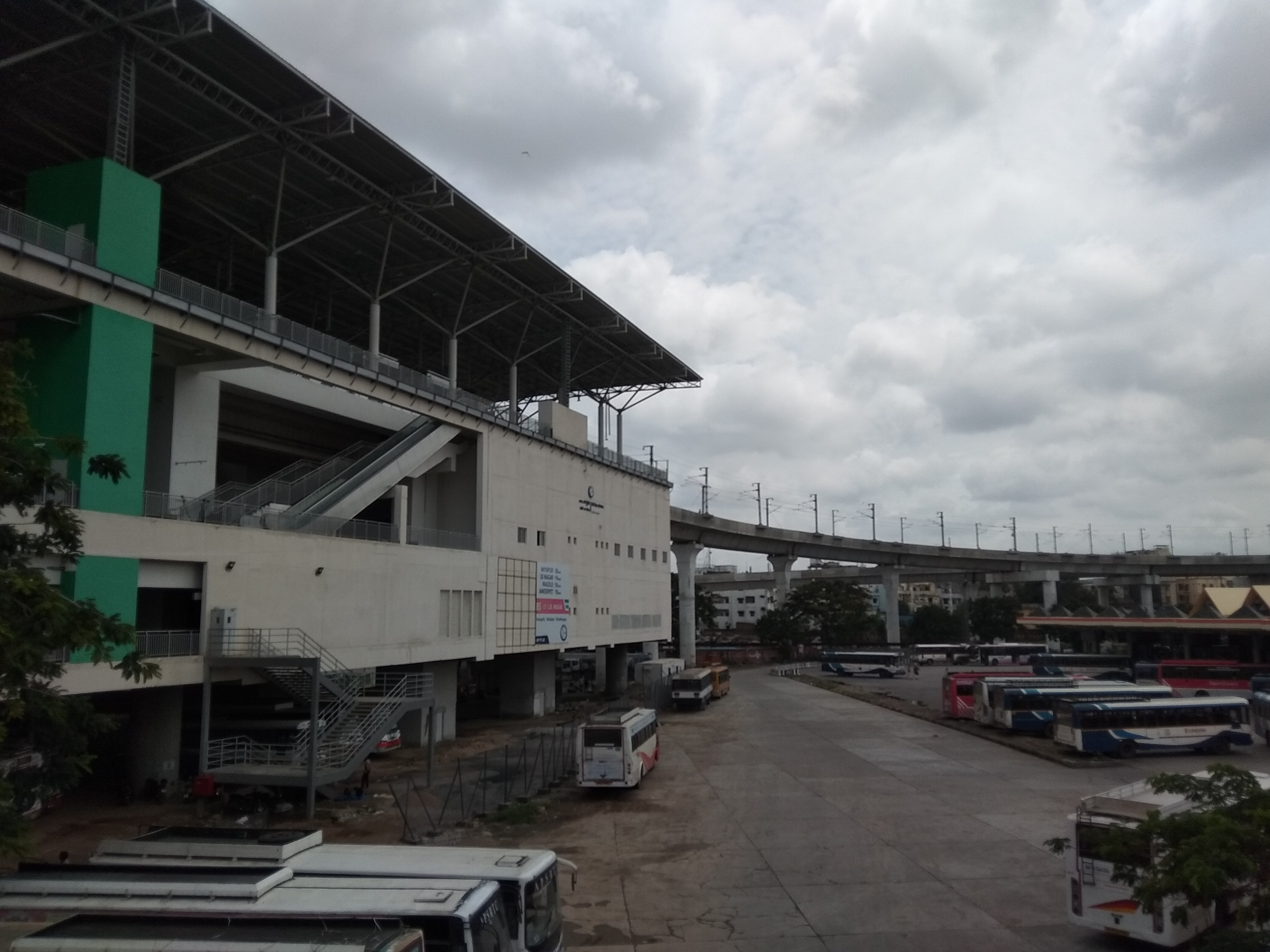
MGBS metro station

Platforms	Buses
1–5	Garuda, Garuda Plus, Vennela, Amaravati, Airavat, Ambaari
6, 7	Bengaluru (TGSRTC)
8	Bengaluru (KSRTC)
9	Anantapur, Dharmavaram, Puttaparthi
10, 11	Suryapet, Khammam, Bhadrachalam, Manuguru
12	Sathupally, Rajamahendravaram, Polavaram
13	Kunta, Bailadilla, Jagdalpur
14, 15	Nalgonda, Miryalaguda, Kodad
16, 17	Guntur, Narsaraopeta, Chilakaluripeta
18–22	Yadagirigutta, Warangal
23	Srisailam
24, 25	Achampeta, Kalwakurthy
26	Raichur
27–31	Mahboobnagar, Wanaparthy, Narayanpet, Hubli
32–34	Nagarkurnool, Kollapur, Shadnagar
35, 36	Vijayawada, Tenali, Eluru (TGSRTC)
37, 38	Vijayawada, Tenali, Eluru (APSRTC)
39	Visakhapatnam, Srikakulam, Vizianagaram, Parvathipuram, Amalapuram, Gudivada, Kakinada (TGSRTC)
40	Visakhapatnam, Srikakulam, Vizianagaram, Parvathipuram, Amalapuram, Gudivada, Kakinada (APSRTC)
41, 42	Gadwal, Kurnool, Tirupati, Chittoor (TGSRTC)
43–45	Kurnool, Tirupati, Chittoor (APSRTC)
46, 47	Medak, Bansuwada, Bodhan
48–52	Zaheerabad, Narayankhed, Karad, Sholapur, Pune, Mumbai (TGSRTC, MSRTC)
53–55	Siddipet, Vemulawada, Karimnagar, Mancherial, Asifabad
56–58	Nizamabad, Adilabad, Nagpur, Amaravati, Nirmal
59–61	Macherla, Ongole, Nellore, Chennai
62	Devarakonda
63–65	Parigi, Vikarabad, Tandur, Yadgir, Sedam
66–75	Arrivals
76–79	City buses
