= Bus station =

Bus facility larger than a bus stop

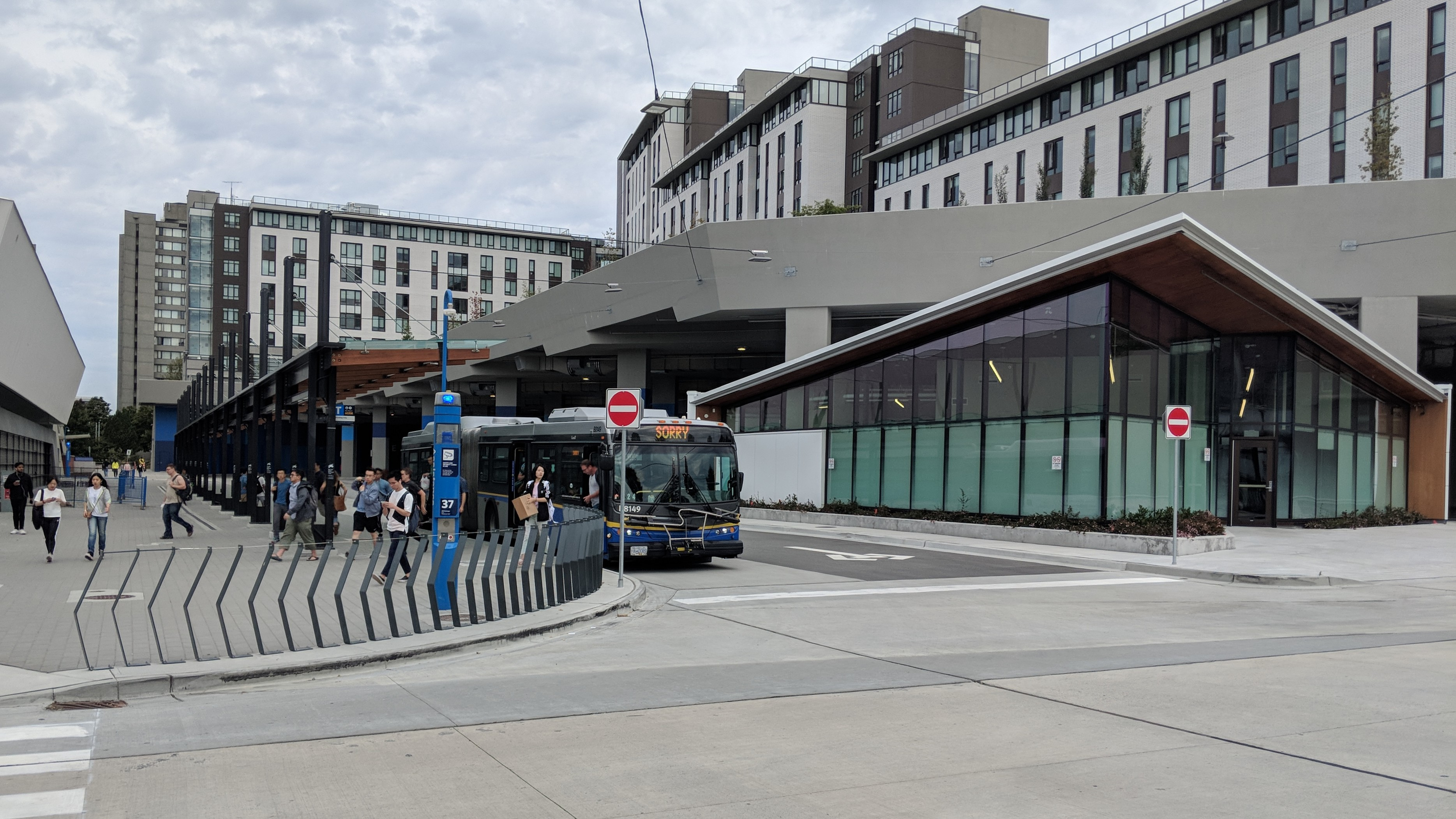
UBC Exchange at the University of British Columbia Vancouver in Canada

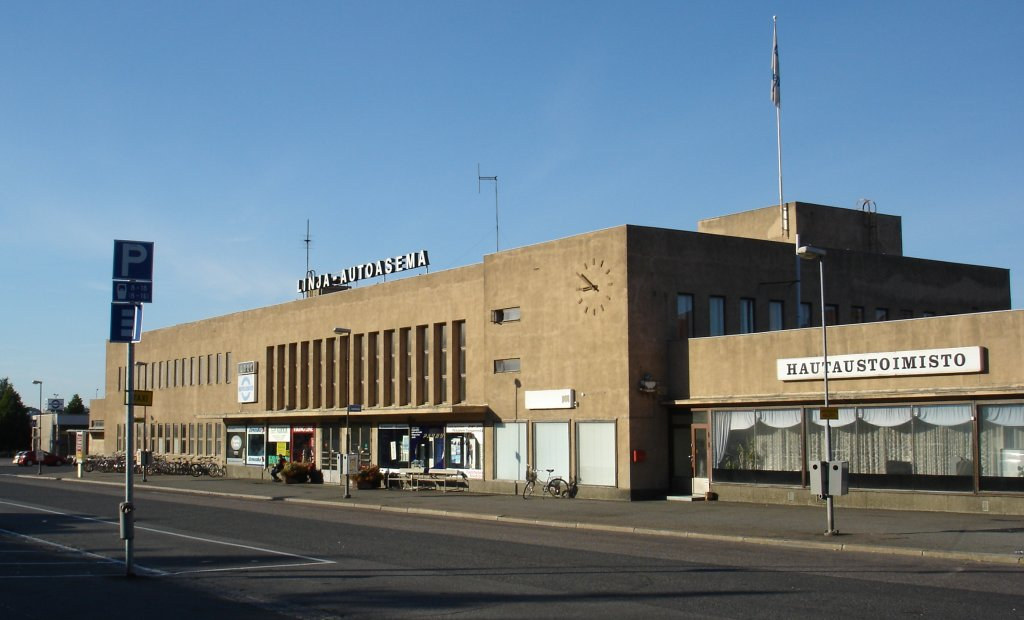
Tampere Bus Station in Ratina, Tampere, Finland

A bus station, bus depot, (Note: The term "bus depot" may also be used to refer to a bus garage, a facility where buses are stored and maintained.) bus interchange or bus exchange is a structure where city buses or intercity buses stop to pick up and drop off passengers. A bus station is larger than a bus stop, which is usually simply a place on the roadside, where buses can stop. It may be intended as a terminal station for a number of routes, or as a transfer station where the routes continue.

Bus station platforms may be assigned to fixed bus lines, or variable in combination with a dynamic passenger information system. The latter requires fewer platforms, but does not provide consistent locations for passengers.

== Largest bus stations ==
Kilambakkam bus terminus in Chennai, India, spreads over an area of 358,200 square metres (88.52 acres), making it the largest bus station in the world.

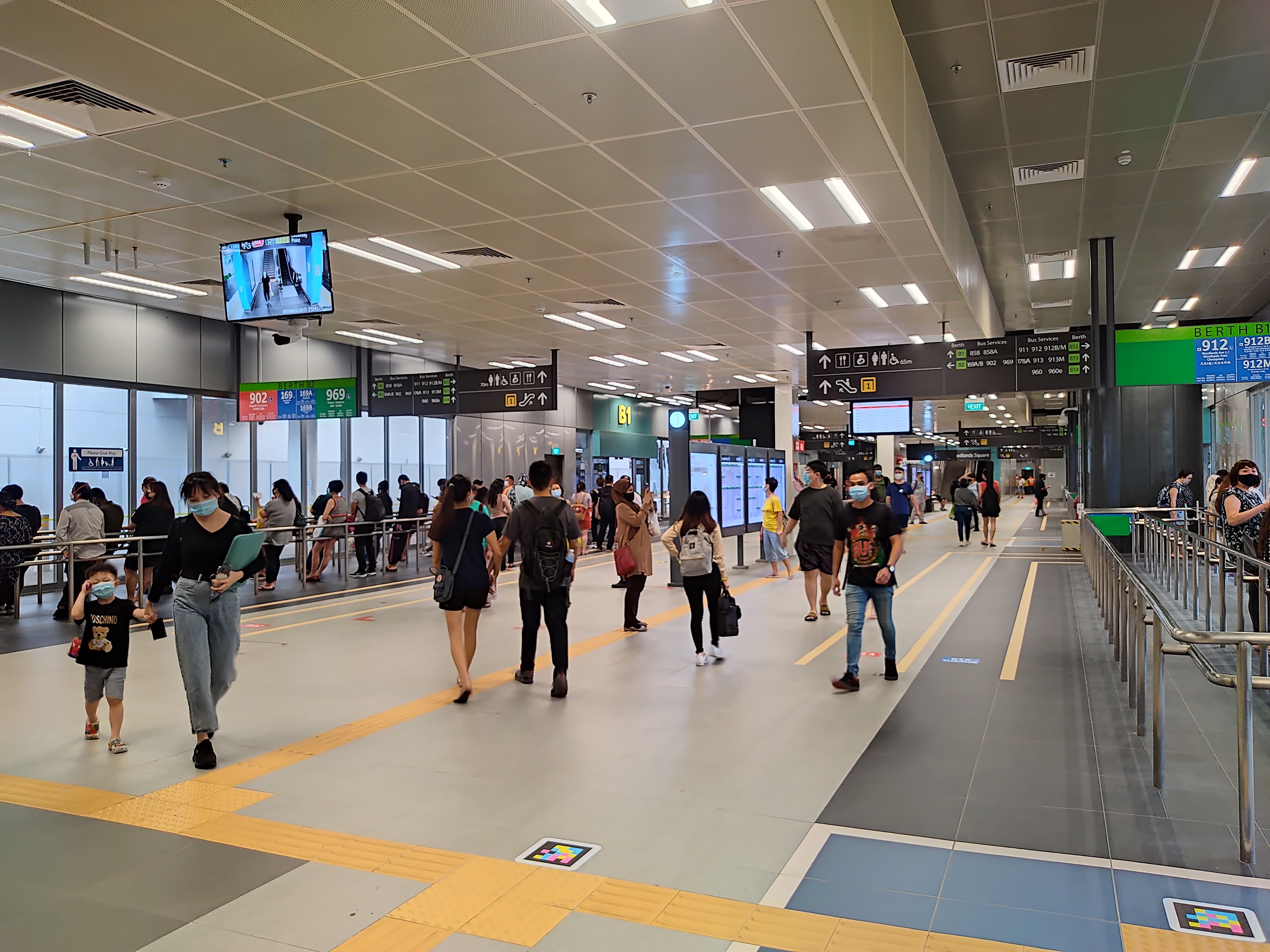
Woodlands Bus Interchange in Singapore

Woodlands Bus Interchange in Singapore is one of the busiest bus stations in the world, handling up to 400,000 passengers daily across 42 bus services. Other Singaporean bus stations, such as Bedok Bus Interchange, Tampines Bus Interchange and Yishun Bus Interchange, handle similar number of passengers daily.

Millennium Park Bus Depot (2010-2014), in Delhi, India, built for the 2010 Commonwealth Games, was once the largest in the world.

The largest underground bus station in Europe is Kamppi Centre in Helsinki, Finland, completed in 2006. The terminal cost 100 million euros to complete and took three years to design and build. Today, the bus terminal, which covers 25,000 square meters, is the busiest bus terminal in Finland. Every day, the terminal has around 700 bus departures, transporting approximately 170,000 passengers.

Preston Bus Station in Preston, England, built in 1969 and later heritage-listed, was described in 2014 as "depending on how you measure it, the largest bus station in the world, the second-biggest in Europe, and the longest in Europe". It was fully refurbished in 2018.

The largest bus terminal in North America is the Port Authority Bus Terminal located in New York City. The terminal is located in Midtown at 625 Eighth Avenue between 40th Street and 42nd Street, one block east of the Lincoln Tunnel and one block west of Times Square. The terminal is the largest in the Western Hemisphere and the busiest in the world by volume of traffic, serving about 8,000 buses and 225,000 people on an average weekday and more than 65 million people a year. It has 223 gates. It operates intercity bus routes all over the United States and some routes with international destinations, mostly in Canada, and mostly operated by Greyhound Lines.

The largest bus terminal in the southern hemisphere is the Tietê Bus Terminal located in São Paulo, Brazil. It is also the 2nd busiest in the world, serving about 90,000 people per weekday in 300 bus lines on its 89 platforms (72 for boarding and 17 for deboarding), with services to over 1,000 cities over the country and South America. The terminal is also linked to Portuguesa-Tietê, an adjacent metro station.

== See also ==
- Bus garage
- Bus stop
- Intermodal passenger transport
- Railway station
