= Kurnool bus station =

Bus station

General information
- Location: Ballari Road, Kurnool, Kurnool District, Andhra Pradesh; India
- Coordinates: 15.8242°N 78.0277°E
- Elevation: 274 m (899 ft)
- Owner: APSRTC
- Operator: APSRTC
- Platforms: 25
- Bus stands: 3

Construction
- Structure type: Arc shaped, Multi storeyed
- Parking: Yes

Other information
- Station code: KNL

History
- Opened: 1985

Passengers
- 80,000/day
Location
- Location within Andhra Pradesh Location within India

Kurnool bus station is a bus station located in Kurnool city of the Indian state of Andhra Pradesh. It is owned by Andhra Pradesh State Road Transport Corporation.

Kurnool is a central transport hub in the region of Rayalaseema. Every bus depot in Rayalaseema runs bus services to Kurnool. Buses are also available for almost every city and town in Southern Andhra Pradesh and Southern Karnataka.

Other major bus operators include KSRTC, which runs from Karnataka, and TSRTC of Telangana. This is one of the major bus stations in the state with services to major cities and towns in the state and to other states like Karnataka and Telangana.

The station is currently being expanded. The city is said to run city busses from 2020 as the second phase of launching city buses in Andhra Pradesh cities.
