= Central Bus Station, Hyderabad =

Bus stand in Hyderabad, India

Central Bus Station (CBS), Hyderabad

General information
- Location: Gowliguda, Hyderabad; India
- Coordinates: 17.2240°N 78.2852°E
- System: Hangar
- Owner: TSRTC
- Operator: Telangana State Road Transport Corporation

Construction
- Structure type: Steel
- Parking: Yes
- Cycle facilities: Yes
- Accessible: Disabled access

Other information
- Station code: TSRTC

History
- Opened: 1930; 96 years ago

Passengers
- 85000
Location

Central Bus Station, Hyderabad, popularly known as CBS, is a bus stand located near Gowliguda, Hyderabad, Telangana, India. It was constructed during Nizam-VII Mir Osman Ali Khan era in 1930 for the maintenance of Mississippi Aircraft. In 1932, it was handed over to Nizam Road Transport services and its name was changed into Gowliguda Bus Stand. It collapsed by itself on 4 July 2018, after having been abandoned a week before.
