= Nizam State Railways - Road Transport Division =

Nizam State Rail & Road Transport Department
- Industry: Bus Service
- Founded: 1932; 93 years ago
- Defunct: 1952; 73 years ago
- Fate: Renamed as Department of Hyderabad State Government in 1952
- Successor: APSRTC, Marathwada State Transport
- Headquarters: Secunderabad, India
- Area served: Hyderabad State
- Key people: Nizam of Hyderabad
- Services: Public Road Transport Service
- Number of employees: 166 (1932)
- Parent: Nizam's Guaranteed State Railway

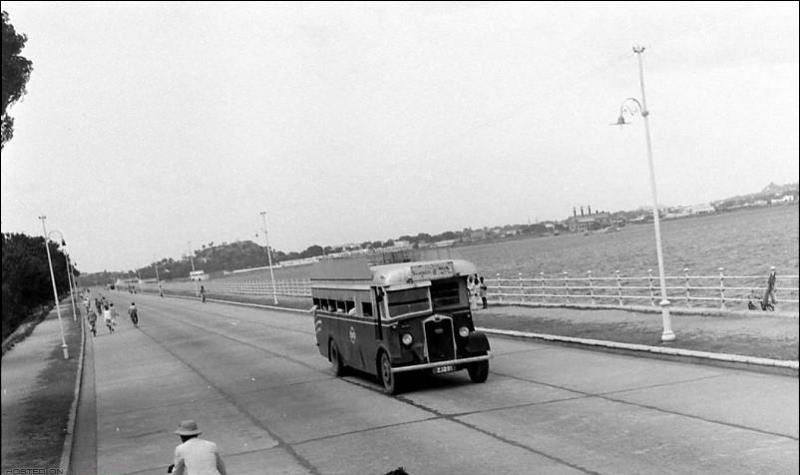
Albion Motors bus of NSR travelling on Tank Bund. c. 1932

Nizam State Rail & Road Transport Department (N.S.R-R.T.D) was a division of the Indian railway company Nizam's Guaranteed State Railway, established in 1932 to cater to the road transport services of the population of the erstwhile Hyderabad State. It was the first time in India that a nationalised road transport service was established.

== History ==
The division was established in 1932, as a part of the Nizam's Guaranteed State Railway to ensure proper coordination between railways and road transportation systems. The services began with 27 vehicles covering over 450 km. Within a decade, at a total expense of 7½ million HRs, this was extended to nearly 500 vehicles, servicing 7200 km.

Initially fully assembled 19-seater buses manufactured by Albion Motors were shipped from England. These buses known as Deccan Queen which were imported from Glasgow were in use till the 1970s. Presently, two of these buses are kept for display at Vijaywada and Hyderabad. Later only the chassis of the buses were imported, the bodies were built locally at Allwyn Metal Works.

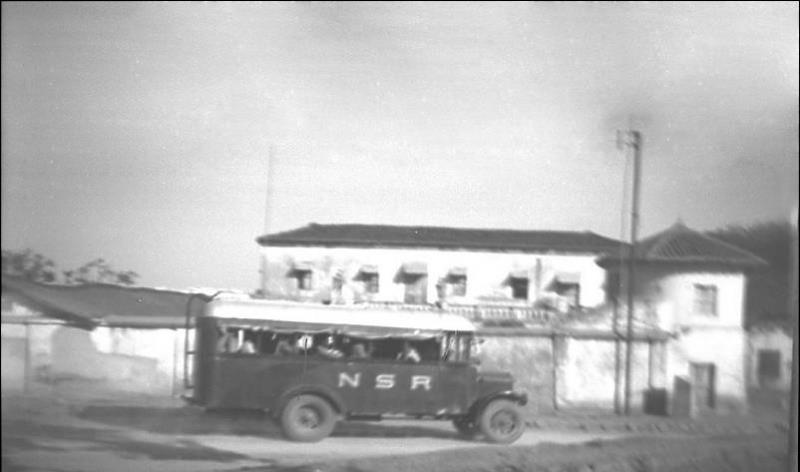
A bus of NSR. c. 1932

The first four depots were established at Kachiguda, Narketpally, Asifabad and Kazipet. A maintenance workshop was established at Mettuguda. By 1940-41 the fleet comprised 256 buses for passengers and 27 trucks for carrying goods. In 1934 aircraft hangars were imported from America for use by Deccan Airways at Begumpet. In 1946 these hangars which were lying unused were handed over to the Road Transport Department for building bus depots. A bus depot at Gowliguda was built using hangar from Mississippi and the depot at Ranigunj was built using hangars taken from Hamilton.

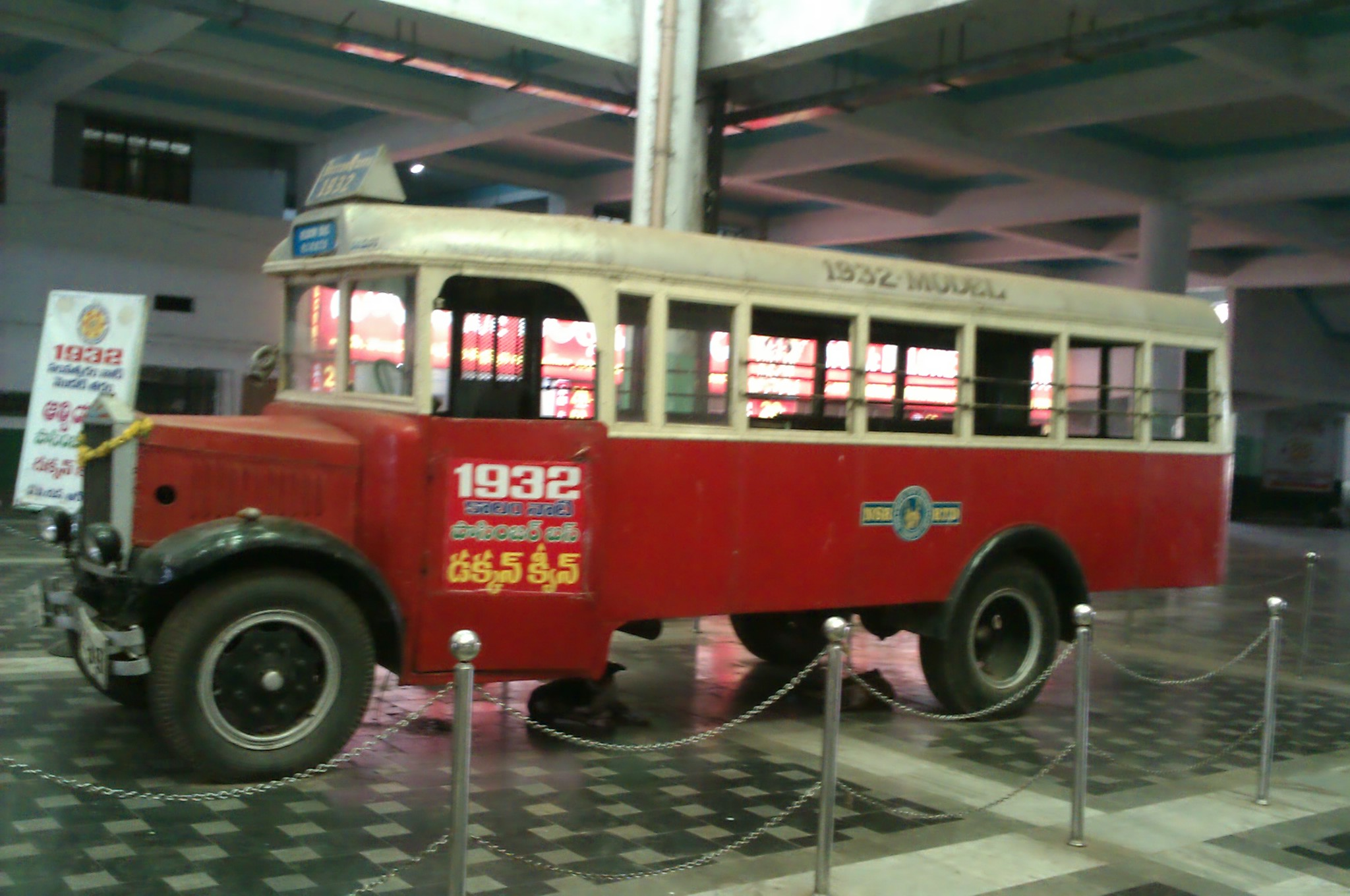
The Deccan Queen bus from the Nizam era at Vijayawada bus station

After integration of Hyderabad with India, the last Nizam Osman Ali Khan, Asaf Jah VII had to hand over the (N.S.R-R.T.D) to the Indian Government. As per a request from the last Nizam it was ensured that all bus registration numbers would include the letter Z, as the letter ‘Z’ in the number plate represents Zahra Begum, mother of Nawab Osman Ali Khan, Asaf Jah VII. On 1 November 1951 NSR-RTD was renamed as a Department of Hyderabad State Government. In 1956 after reorganisation of Hyderabad, the operations of transport services in Marathwada region was handed over to Transferred Road Transport Undertakings Department which was under the erstwhile Government of Bombay. In 1961 this department was later abolished and became Marathwada State Transport. This was later made a part of Bombay State Road Transport Corporation which eventually was renamed as Maharashtra State Road Transport Corporation. In 1958 APSRTC was formed to serve all the areas served by erstwhile NSR-RTD in the new state of Andhra Pradesh.

== See also ==
- Andhra Pradesh State Road Transport Corporation
- Telangana State Road Transport Corporation
