= Jawaharlal Nehru Auto Nagar Industrial Estate, Vijayawada =

Industrial estate in Vijayawada, Andhra Pradesh

Coordinates: 16.49261°N 80.67154°E

The Jawaharlal Nehru Auto Nagar Industrial Estate (also known as Autonagar and Jawahar Autonagar) is an Industrial estate located in eastern side of Vijayawada in the Indian state of Andhra Pradesh. The Jawahar Autonagar is first largest auto industry hubs of Asia. It is also the first Autonagar of the state. It was established in 1966 and has completed 50 years of existence in the year 2016.

== Transport ==
APSRTC City Bus Routes

Route number	Start	End	Via
11	Autonagar Bus Stand	Milk Project	Auto Nagar Bus Stand, Patamata, Benz Circle, Ring, ESI, Gunadala Vanthena, Gunadala Church, Padavalarevu, Anjaneya Swamy Temple, SRR, Maruthi, Kothavantena, Vijayatalkies, Besent Road, Lenine Center, Challapalli Bungalow, Bus Stand, KR Market, Milk Project
144	Autonagar Bus Stand	Kondapalli	Auto Nagar Bus Stand, Benz Circle, Post Office Bus stop, Pnbs, Kondapalli
26H	Autonagar Bus Stand	Hb Colony	Auto Nagar Bus Stand, Patamata, Benz Circle, Igmc Stadium, Bandar Locks Bus Stop, Pnbs, KR Market Bus Stop, Hb Colony
29	Autonagar Bus Stand	Kaleswararao Market	Auto Nagar Bus Stand, Railway Station, Kaleswararao Market
31	Autonagar Bus Stand	Milk Project	Auto Nagar Bus Stand, Patamata, Benz Circle, Igmc Stadium, Bandar Locks Bus Stop, Old Bus Stand, Pnbs, KR Market Bus Stop, Milk Project
31H	Autonagar Bus Stand	Hb Colony	Auto Nagar Bus Stand, Patamata, Benz Circle, Igmc Stadium, Bandar Locks Bus Stop, Old Bus Stand, Pnbs, KR Market Bus Stop, Hb Colony
41V	Autonagar Bus Stand	Vombay Colony	Auto Nagar Bus Stand, Raghavaiah park, Cherllapalli Bunglow, Ajithsingh Nagar, Vombay Colony
5	Autonagar Bus Stand	Kabela	Auto Nagar Bus Stand, Patamata, Benz Circle, Ramesh Hospital Stop, Pushpa Hotel, Besent Road, Nakkal Road, Old Bus Stand, Bus Stand, Tummalapalli Kalkshetram, KR Market Bus Stop, Kabela
5SG	Autonagar Bus Stand	Railway Station	Auto Nagar Bus Stand, Gurunanak Colony, Ramesh Hospital Stop, Pushpa Hotel, Besent Road, Nakkal Road, Old Bus Stand, Railway Station
54	Autonagar Bus Stand	Railway Station	Auto Nagar Bus Stand, Patamata, Benz Circle, Ramesh Hospital Stop, Vinayak Theatre, Ramavarappadu Bus Stop, Maruthi Nagar, Vijaya Talkies, Railway Station
5G	Autonagar Bus Stand	Kaleswararao Market	Auto Nagar Bus Stand, Gurunanak Colony, Ramesh Hospital Stop, Pushpa Hotel, Besent Road, Nakkal Road, Old Bus Stand, Bus Stand, Tummalapalli Kalkshetram, KR Market Bus Stop, Kaleswararao Market
7A	Autonagar Gate	Kaleswararao Market	Pedda Puli Paka, Autonagar Gate, Patamata, Benz Circle, Igmc Stadium, Bandar Locks Bus Stop, Kaleswararao Market
7R	Autonagar Gate	Milk Project	Yanamala Kuduru, Autonagar Gate, Patamata, Benz Circle, Igmc Stadium, Bandar Locks Bus Stop, Old Bus Stand, Pnbs, KR Market Bus Stop, Milk Project
