= Andhra Pradesh State Road Transport Corporation =

State-owned public transport corporation in Andhra Pradesh, India

- Native name: Āndhra Pradēś Rāṣṭra Rōḍḍu Ravāṇā Sanstha
- Type: Public
- Industry: Public transport bus service
- Founded: 11 January 1958 (68 years ago)
- Headquarters: Vijayawada, Andhra Pradesh, India
- Number of locations: 26 Regions; 4 Zones; 129 Depots; 423 Bus Stations
- Area served: Intrastate (Primary Base): Andhra Pradesh; Interstate: Chhattisgarh; Karnataka; Maharashtra; Odisha; Tamil Nadu; Telangana; Yanam (Puducherry)
- Key people: Mandipalli Ramprasad Reddy (Minister of Transport, Government of Andhra Pradesh); Konakalla Narayana Rao (Chairman); Ch. D. Tirumala Rao, IPS (Vice-Chairman and Managing Director)
- Services: Public transport; Logistic services
- Revenue: ▲₹130,600,000 (US$1.4 million)
- Owner: Government of Andhra Pradesh
- Number of employees: 25,598 (June 2024)
- Parent: Ministry of Transport, Government of Andhra Pradesh
- Website: APSRTC official website

The Andhra Pradesh State Road Transport Corporation (APSRTC) is the state-owned road transport corporation in the Indian state of Andhra Pradesh. Its headquarters is located at NTR Administrative Block of RTC House in Pandit Nehru bus station of Vijayawada. Many other Indian metros and towns in Telangana, Tamil Nadu, Karnataka, Odisha and Chhattisgarh are also linked with the APSRTC services. It was merged into the state government after the creation of AP Public Transport Department (APPTD) in September 2019.

== History ==
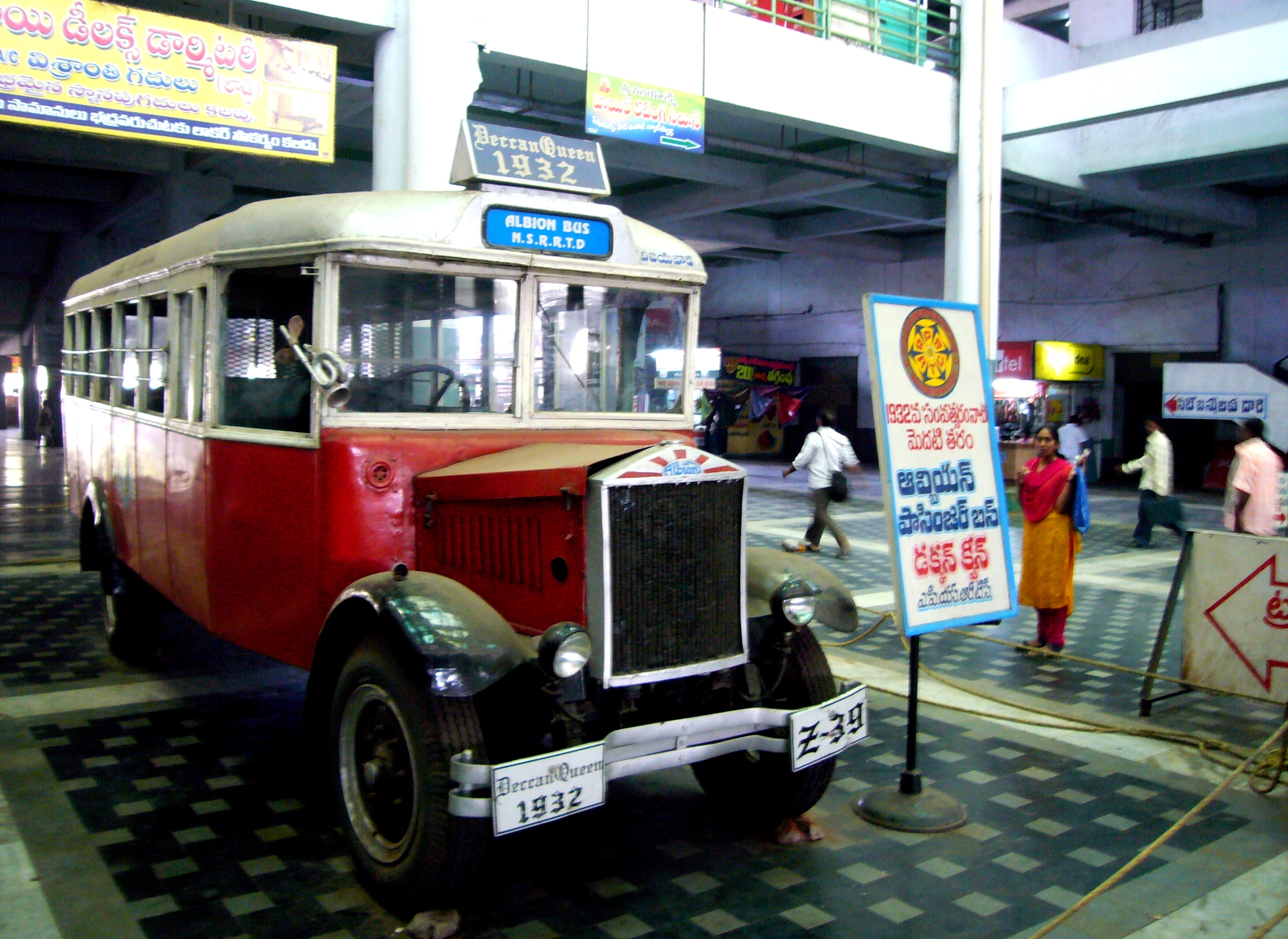
1932 Deccan Queen bus in Vijayawada Bus Station

In the erstwhile Hyderabad State, bus services were initially started in June 1932 as part of the Nizam State Rail and Road Transport Department, a wing of Nizam State Railway. APSRTC was formed on 11 January 1958 as per "Road Transport Corporations Act 1950". Consequent upon bifurcation of Andhra Pradesh state into Telangana and residual Andhra Pradesh, Telangana State Road Transport Corporation is operated as a separate entity from 3 June 2015. APSRTC is working from Vijayawada (Pandit Nehru Bus Stand) as Headquarters for the state of Andhra Pradesh. APSRTC has a target to convert its entire bus fleet to electric buses using both battery electric buses and fuel cell buses by the year 2029.

== Administration ==
The organisation is divided into four zones with twelve regional managers. As of March 2025, it has a total of 11,495 buses (government-owned 8716; hire on rental 2779) operating in 38.59 lakh kilometers and has a total of 423 bus stations and 129 bus depots. The APSRTC connects 14,123 villages, transports 35.09 lakh passengers, and makes 14.46 crore rupees in earnings per day. On average, each bus covers 336 kilometers and makes 12,580 rupees in earnings per day. From 30 January 2019, all the APSRTC vehicles in the state are registered as AP–39, followed by "Z" and four digits.

== Employees ==
The organisation has a total of 46,051 employees and several trade unions representing them. The "Andhra Pradesh Public Transport Department Employees Union" or "APPTD Employees Union" was originally formed in July 1952 as "APSRTC Employees Union" and is affiliated with the All India Trade Union Congress and AP JAC Amaravati. The APSRTC Staff and Workers Federation was established in 2008 and is affiliated with the Centre of Indian Trade Unions. The APSRTC National Mazdoor Union, APSRTC Karmika Parishat (affiliated to Telugu Desam Party) and YSR RTC Mazdoor Union (affiliated to YSR Congress Party) also represent sections of the employees.

== Types of services ==
The Andhra Pradesh State Road Transport Corporation operates various services both for urban transport as well as intercity and village transport, and cargo services.

Bus Service Types in APSRTC
Service Type	Description	Facilities
NON - OPRS/OPRS(For Ultra Deluxe, Express, Super Luxury, Indra A/C, Saptagiri Express)	Non-Reservation short distance services include a range of bus options like Pallevelugu, Ultra Pallevelugu, Express, Saptagiri Express, Green Saptagiri, Ultra Deluxe, Super Luxury, Indra A/C and city services includes City Ordinary, Metro Express, Metro Deluxe, and Metro Luxury A/C.	Live tracking
OPRS	Online Passenger Reservation System for long-distance services, operated day and night. Includes Express, Saptagiri Express, Ultra Deluxe, Super Luxury, Indra A/C, Metro Luxury A/C, Garuda A/C, Garuda Plus, Amaravati, Dolphin Cruise, Star Liner, Night Rider, Vennela Sleeper A/C.	Online and Offline Reservation Facility, Live Bus Tracking in APSRTC LIVE TRACK app.
Cargo	Rapid cargo services for transporting bulk goods. Uses Depot Goods Trucks (DGT) for bulk goods materials.	To book cargo services

=== Description of various bus types and services ===
Various bus services operated by the Andhra Pradesh State Road Transport Corporation.

Service Name	Description	Facilities	Image
Amaravathi (Multi Axle A/C)	Named after the capital city of Andhra Pradesh. Operates as inter-city services, both night and day.	Reservation, Live tracking, Bottled water, Tissues.	
Aero Express Electric Vehicles ( Alluri Sitarama Raju International Airport Services)	These Buses are Air Conditioner Low floor Electric Vehicles brought under PM Eeva Scheme. These Buses are operating between Alluri Seetharama Raju International Airport to Gajuwaka via two routes such as Beach road and Maddilapalem Routes.	Air Conditioner Buses , Live Bus Tracking facility , Online Booking is avilable for this services.	
Dolphin Cruise (Multi Axle A/C)	Named after Dolphin Nose Hills in Visakhapatnam. Connects Visakhapatnam with major cities. Longest buses in fleet.	Bottled water, Newspaper, Tissues, Reservation, Live tracking.	
Vennela (Sleeper A/C)	Long-distance sleeper services operated during the night. Travels to major cities.	Bottled water, Napkins, Reading lamp, Soft cushioned berths, Reservation, Live tracking.	
Night Rider (Seater Cum Sleeper A/C)	Sleeper Cum Seater A/C coaches for night services. Available with berths and seats.	Reading Lamp, Soft Cushioned Berths & Seats, Bottled water, Napkins, Blankets, Reservation, Live tracking.	
Star Liner (Non A/C Sleeper)	Non A/C Sleeper Coaches. Introduced in November 2022.	Soft Cushioned Sleeper Berths, Reading lamps, Bed lamps, Pillows, Bed Sheets, Reservation, Live tracking.	
Garuda Plus (Multi Axle A/C)	Replaced and Discontinued: Similar facilities to Amaravathi and Dolphin Cruise. Replaced and discontinued, replaced by Amaravathi and Dolphin Cruise (Multi Axle).	Same as Amaravathi and Dolphin Cruise (Multi Axle).	
Garuda (A/C)	Day and night inter-city services to various cities. Semi Sleeper Seats, Soft Cushioned Seats.	Reservation, Live tracking.	
Indra (A/C)	Cost-effective A/C services for night reservation from small towns to major cities.	Semi Sleeper/Rectilinear Seats, Reservation, Live tracking.	
Metro Luxury (A/C)	Inter-city A/C services between major towns. Also operates as Airport Services.	Reservation, Live Tracking.	
Super Luxury (Non A/C Seater)	Night and day reservation services between main towns. Majority in the reservation category.	Soft Cushioned Rectilinear Seats, Air Suspension Coach, TV, Reservation, Live tracking.	Super Luxury bus side view at Tirupati bus station
Ultra Deluxe/Deluxe (Non A/C)	Inter-city reservation and non-reservation services. 2+2 seating Non A/C. Much higher fare than Express and Pallevelugu.	2+2 Semi Sleeper Rectilinear Seats, Reservation, Live tracking.	APSRTC Ultra Deluxe bus
Express (Non A/C)	Inter-city services with 3+2 seating. Higher fare than ordinary "Palle velugu" services.	3+2 seating Non A/C, Reservation, Live tracking.	An express bus of the APSRTC
Saptagiri Express (Green Saptagiri Electric Vehicle - EV )	First electric buses introduced in APSRTC fleet to reduce pollution in Tirumala Tirupathi route. Operating between various cities.	Online Reservation, Soft cushioned seats, A/C coach, Live tracking.	
Saptagiri Express (Non A/C)	Operates along Tirumala ghat section to carry pilgrims from major cities. Some services to neighboring states.	Online Reservation, Live tracking.	Satyavedu bus at Tirupati bus station
Ultra Pallevelugu (Non A/C)	Limited Halt (L.H) ordinary services with fewer stops. Fare between "Pallevelugu" and "Express" services.	Limited stops, fare between "Pallevelugu" and "Express".	
Palle Velugu (Non A/C)	Rural ordinary services connecting mandals, villages, towns, and district headquarters. Majority in APSRTC fleet.	Connects rural areas, primary service in APSRTC.	Palle Velugu Side view

=== City services include ===
Service Name	Description	Facilities	Image
Metro Express	Limited Halt city express services operating on city routes and inter-city L.H services.	Limited bus passes for students and citizens. Operates in cities like Visakhapatnam, Vijayawada.	Metro Express bus
City Ordinary	Ordinary services operated by APSRTC in major cities of Andhra Pradesh. Operates in Visakhapatnam, Vijayawada, Guntur, Tirupati as city ordinary services.	More rushed due to providing bus passes to students and citizens. Services most bus stops.	Newly painted APSRTC City Bus
Metro Deluxe (Replaced and Discontinued)	City express services operated as limited Halt (L.H) service. A/C and non A/C services in major cities connecting important areas and tourist spots. Operated under JNNURM Scheme.	Replaced and Discontinued. Replaced by "Metro Express" and "Metro Luxury" services.	

=== DGT (Depot Goods Truck) ===
These services offered by APSRTC to carry parcels, couriers, goods and bulk materials. These services can be booked and utilised by public for shifting their goods and valuables. Every bus depot in APSRTC having one DGT Bus.

== Performance and earnings ==
As of March 2019, the organisation had gross earnings of ₹5,995 crores, and with an accumulated loss of ₹6,445 crores.

- APSRTC was first State Transport to introduce Hi-Tech Luxury Buses in government bus sector.
- APSRTC was the first state transport to introduce cargo services and computized system in all depots.
- APSRTC was the first state transport to introduce Live Bus tracking facilities for 15000 Buses. ( In District and City Services )
- GPS (Global positioning system) is fixed in all types of buses. AIS 140 model, GPS devices are used for live tracking of buses.
- First to Introduce Digital Payments, QR - PAYMENTS using E - POS machines for ticketing across entire State.
- First to Introduce Vehicle Tracking System ( VTS ) & Passenger Information Systems ( PIS ).
- First to Introduce Door Step Cargo Services.
- First to Introduce Online Booking for Cargo. ( Phase - 1 VIJAYAWADA - VISAKHAPATNAM available ).

== Depots ==
APSRTC has 129 depots across the state. All the 129 depots are 100% computerized.

=== List of Depots in APSRTC ===
1. Addanki
2. Adoni
3. Alipiri
4. Allagadda
5. Amalapuram
6. Anantapur
7. Anakapalli
8. Atmakur, Nandyal district
9. Atmakur, Nellore district
10. Avanigadda
11. Badvel
12. Banaganapally
13. Bapatla
14. Bhimavaram
15. Chilakaluripeta
16. Chirala
17. Chittoor -1
18. Chittoor -2
19. Dharmavaram
20. Dhone
21. Eleswaram
22. Eluru
23. Giddaluru
24. Gokavaram
25. Gooty
26. Gudivada
27. Gudur
28. Guntakal
29. Guntur -1
30. Guntur -2
31. Hindupur
32. Jagayyapeta
33. Jammalamadugu
34. Jangareddygudem
35. Kadapa
36. Kadiri
37. Kakinada
38. Kalyandurgam
39. Kandukur
40. kanigiri
41. Kavali
42. Koilakuntla
43. Kovvur
44. Kuppam
45. Kurnool -1
46. Kurnool -2
47. Macherla
48. Machilipatnam
49. Madanapally -1
50. Madanapally -2
51. Madakasira
52. Mangalagiri
53. Markapur
54. Mydukuru
55. Nandikotkur
56. Nandyal
57. Narsipatnam
58. Narsapuram
59. Narsaraopeta
60. Nellore -1
61. Nellore -2
62. Nidadavole
63. Nuzvidu
64. Ongole
65. Paderu
66. Palakonda
67. Palamaneru
68. Palasa
69. Parvathipuram
70. Pattikonda
71. Penukonda
72. Piduguralla
73. Pileru
74. Podili
75. Ponnur
76. Proddatur
77. Pulivendula
78. Punganur
79. Puttaparthy
80. Puttur
81. Rajamahendravaram
82. Rajampeta
83. Razole
84. Ramachandrapuram
85. Rapur
86. Ravulapalem
87. Rayachoty
88. Rayadurgam
89. Repalle
90. S.kota
91. Salur
92. Sattenapalle
93. Satyavedu
94. Srikakulam -1
95. Srikakulam -2
96. Srikalahasti
97. Sullurpeta
98. Tadepalligudem
99. Tadipatri
100. Tanuku
101. Tekkali
102. Tenali
103. Tirumala (Tirupati)
104. Mangalam, (Tirupati)
105. Tirupathi
106. Tiruvuru
107. Tuni
108. Udayagiri
109. Uravakonda
110. Vakadu
111. Venkatagiri
112. Jawahar Autonagar (Vijayawada)
113. Governorpeta -1 (Vijayawada)
114. Governorpeta -2 (Vijayawada)
115. Ibrahimpatnam (Vijayawada)
116. Gannavaram (Vijayawada)
117. Pandit Nehru bus station, Krishna Lanka (Vijayawada)
118. Vidyadharapuram (Vijayawada)
119. Vinukonda
120. Dwaraka Nagar (Visakhapatnam)
121. Gajuwaka (Visakhapatnam)
122. Madurawada (Visakhapatnam)
123. Maddilapalem (Visakhapatnam)
124. Simhachalam (Visakhapatnam)
125. VSC Steel city (Visakhapatnam)
126. Waltair (Visakhapatnam)
127. Vizianagaram
128. Vuyyuru
129. Yemmiganur

== Zones ==
APSRTC having 4 Zones . Maintenance and refurbishment of buses are carried out here. These Zonal workshops having High technology featured equipment for maintenance and refurbishment of buses.

- Vizianagaram
- Vijayawada
- Nellore
- Kadapa

== Regions ==
APSRTC having 12 regions across the state. Following are the 12 regions of APSRTC.

- Anantapur
- Chittoor
- East Godavari
- Guntur
- Kadapa
- Krishna
- Kurnool
- North Central region (NEC Region), Vizianagaram Region
- Nellore
- Prakasam
- Tirupati
- Visakhapatnam
- West Godavari

== Passenger Amenities and Mobile App's from APSRTC ==
=== Mobile App / web Page to Book (OPRS) Reservation Ticket ===
- Mobile app and web portal for Online Reservation is designed and provided for passengers to book tickets on one's Phone.
- Reservation counters are also provided at bus stations.
- Reservation Tickets can also Book through ATB Agents.
- This feature reduce crowds at reservation counters, regulates money retail issues
- This makes passengers more ease to Book tickets on one's Phone.

=== APSRTC Live Track App / Web Page for Passengers ===
- APSRTC LIVE TRACK is an APP offered by APSRTC, for live tracking and live location of buses.
- This APP Came into Commence in 2015 for OPRS services and later extended to NON - OPRS Services.
- This future helps passengers to get live Location of buses on electronic maps (Google Maps, MapmyIndia, OpenStreetMap), which was designed in APP and Web Page.
- Bus live tracking facility is Provided for NON -OPRS and OPRS Bus Services.
- Passengers can estimate the arrival and Departure of Buses to Bus stand and Bus stops enroute.
- Backend servers are used for control of this Bus live tracking feature.
- This feature is Mostly used by Remote villages to know about District ordinary Services.
- Submit of feed back on Bus condition, Diver and Conductor Behaviour, Women Safety, Breakdown, Report Accident features are provided.
- Passengers can interact with Depot managers, Regional managers, Zonal managers by phone numbers provided in the app.
- Passengers can search and locate nearby Bus stops using the GPS location of their phone.

=== Amenities Provided for Passengers at Bus Stands/Stations ===
- All the bus station across the state are modified under State of Art and passenger amenities are provided such as Dormitories, Waiting longues, Shops and Stalls, Drinking water facilities.
- Public Toilets under Swach Bharat Mission are Provided for Passengers.

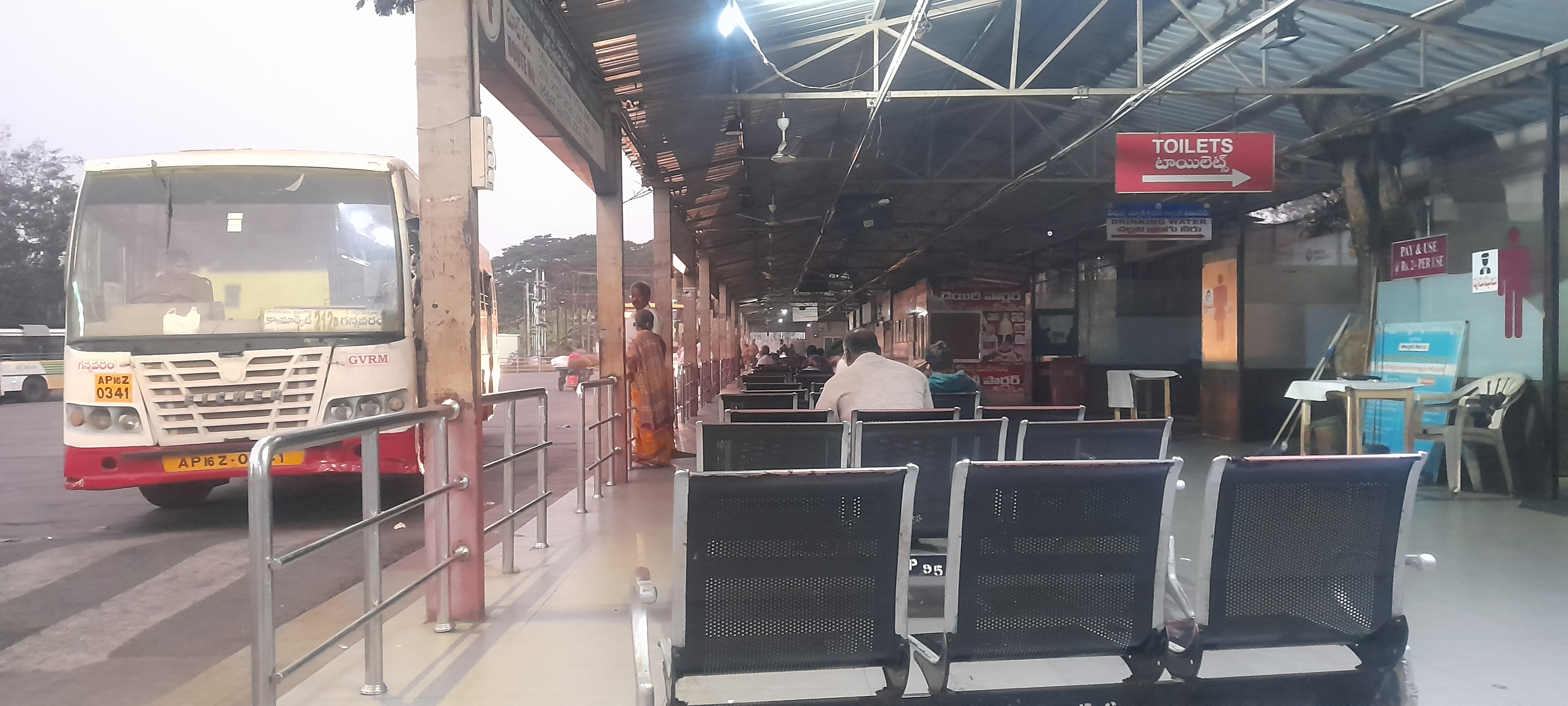
APSRTC city bus stand at PNBS Vijayawada

=== APSRTC Digital Payments ===
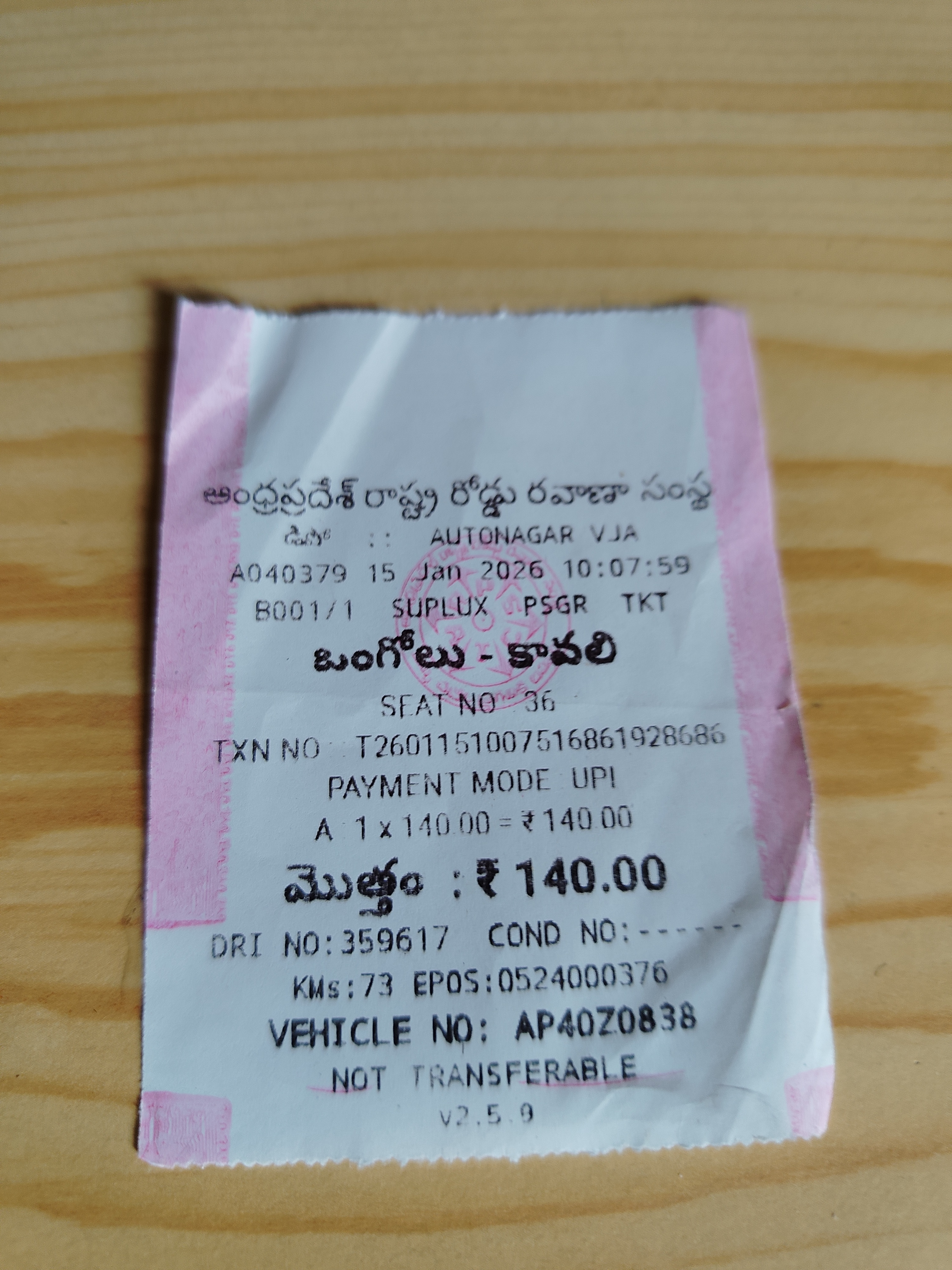
Sample ticket of APSRTC Bus indicating UPI payment

- APSRTC Is implementing Digital Payments in OPRS and NON - OPRS buses.
- Android E-POS Machine's (Electronic Point of Sale) are provided to APSRTC Staff.
- Payment of tickets can be done through Google pay, Phone pay, Paytm using the QR Code generated in EPOS Machine, for from & to Bus Stops.
- Digital Payments in Cargo Booking.
- Credit & debit card Payments.
- RFID Bus pass scanning.
- Call center.
- Command Control Centre (CCC).
- Booking of Non reservation bus tickets and generation of QR code
- Issuing E-PoS Machines for offline Bus ticket generating using QR, Bus Tracking and live location.
- Replacement of Existing TIM Machines and Providing E-Pos machines for seamless Connectivity.

== Awards and achievements ==
- It entered the Guinness Book of World Records on 31 October 1999, with 22,000 buses making it the largest bus fleet in the world.
- Highest km/L (Kilometers per liter) fuel efficiency for 2011–12 – Mofussil services and Vijayawada (urban division)
- Best Road Safety record for 2012–13

Andhra Pradesh State Road Transport Corporation has a number of firsts to its credit in India.

- First to nationalize passenger Road Transport Services in the country – 1932
- First to introduce long-distance night express services
- First to introduce A/C Sleeper, Hi-tech, Metro Liner, Inter-City Services and Metro Express
- First to introduce depot computerisation – 1986
- First to appoint Safety Commissioner for improving the safety of passengers
- All 126 depots in the state are computerized
- Reservation of tickets on telephone and door delivery of tickets
- Award from The Indian Express in digital technology to category of enterprise application. This is fifth award in a row for APSRTC in this category event held in Kochi on 25 February 2023.

== See also ==
- Nizam State Rail and Road Transport Department.
