= Millennium Park Bus Depot =

Bus station in Delhi, India

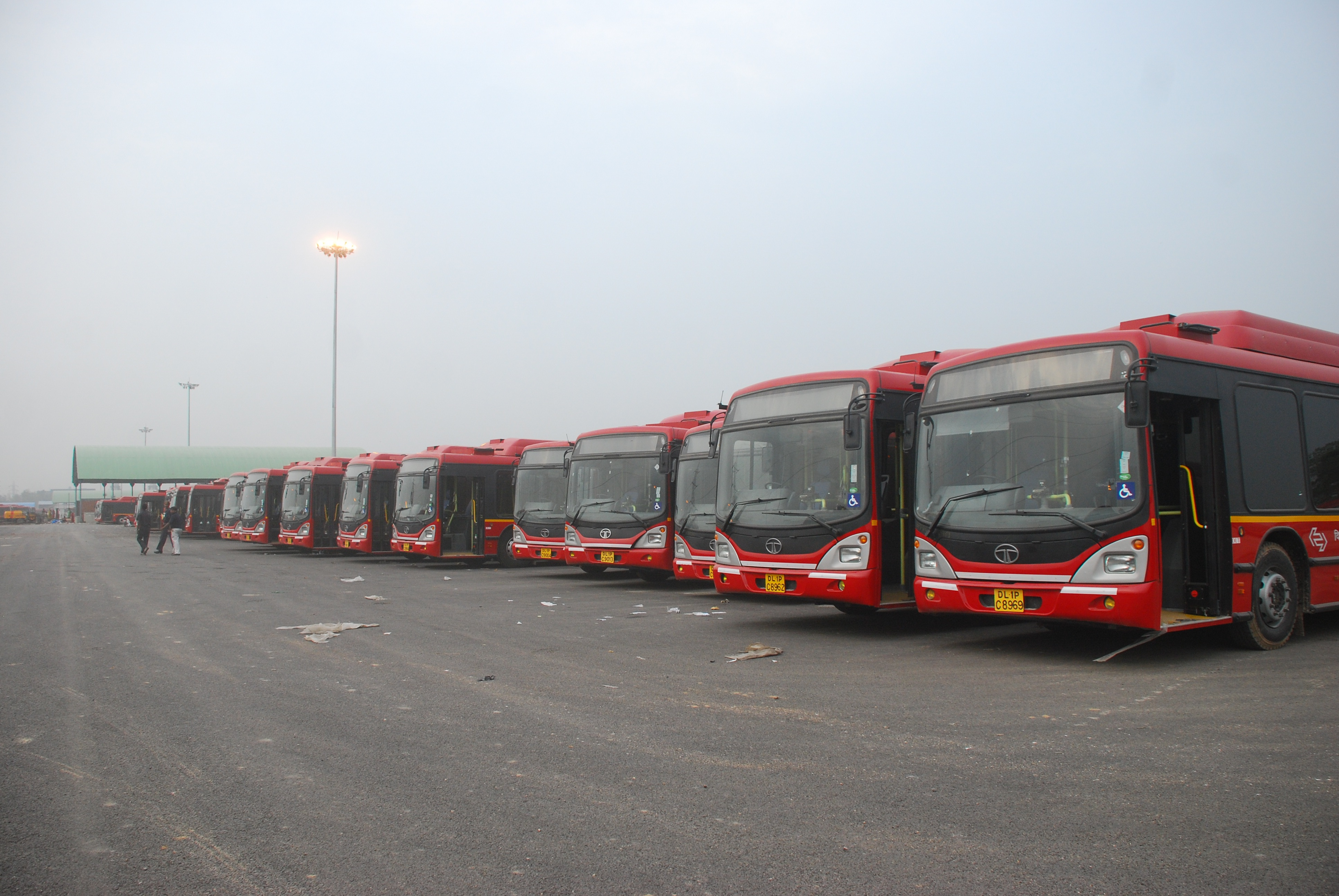
- View of the depot during 2010 Commonwealth Games

General information
- Location: Outer Ring Road, Nizamuddin East, Delhi, India
- Coordinates: 28°36′13″N 77°15′20″E
- Owner: Delhi Transport Corporation

History
- Opened: 17 September 2010
Location

The Millennium Park Bus Depot was a major bus station located in Delhi, India. It was the largest bus depot in the world. Constructed primarily by the city's Public Works Department, the depot was inaugurated on 17 September 2010. The depot occupied an area of 243,000 m^{2} (60 acres), and had the capacity to park up to 1,000 buses at a time under shed, constituting 14% of the total parking capacity of all DTC depots combined (7,000 buses). Though initially used exclusively for the 2010 Commonwealth Games, the depot was used as a regular bus station operated by the Delhi Transport Corporation post the Games. While the benefits of the depot were well-recognized, the depot was also the center of much controversy and criticism especially regarding its "temporary" nature and the violation of environmental norms. Following a 2014 decision by the Delhi High Court, the depot was ordered to be destroyed, and land reclamation efforts began in 2023.

== Construction ==
The Delhi Development Authority envisioned the bus depot as a part of the Central Government's "Master Plan 2021" for Delhi, and the Zonal Development Plan-O. In accordance with this, the Government constituted the Yamuna River Development Authority to examine the feasibility of the proposal. In 2007, after inviting suggestions and objections from several quarters, the panel approved the construction of the depot.

In January 2009, the city-level Public Works Department (PWD) was provided with three possible places to set up the depot. Finally, the location of the depot was decided to be opposite to the Millennium Indraprastha Park, located on the Outer Ring Road near the Nizamuddin Bridge; incidentally, the depot was ultimately situated next to the Games Village near the Akshardham Temple, on the opposite side of the river Yamuna. Since the depot happened to be on the banks of the river, the DTC had to obtain special clearance so as to allow construction in spite of a moratorium which expressly forbade construction on the river banks. Land was obtained from two thermal power stations: the Indraprastha Power Station and the Rajghat Power Station, and 29 acres of land was cleared from them for use. Later, more land was given to construct the facilities of the depot.

The construction was sanctioned to the PWD in four phases, with the first sanction being received in September 2009 and the final sanction in April 2010. Environmentally friendly techniques were used throughout the construction of the depot; the station was constructed atop a fly ash pond previously used by the nearby power plants to dump wastes. There were several roadblocks faced during construction, notably poor weather and the fact that the slushy area had soil of very poor load-bearing capacity, which made it difficult to hold up the structure; overcoming these problems required special construction methods. In spite of the problems, the depot's construction was completed in less than a year's time at a cost of ₹61 crore (US$6.3 million). The station was formally inaugurated on 17 September 2010 by Delhi Chief Minister Sheila Dikshit.

== Overview ==
=== Uses ===
The Millennium Park Bus Depot was initially used exclusively for the 2010 Commonwealth Games, with the main aim of maintaining the fleet of 600 buses to be utilised for the transport of athletes, media-persons and officials around the city. Additionally, the depot was also used to house a number of police vehicles so as to fully secure the ongoing events. On the eve of inauguration, Dikshit commented that the new depot "ushered in a new era in creation of world-class road transport facility"; additionally, she commented on the beautification of the area created due to the depot's construction. After the Games concluded, the depot was used as a shed for 1,000 buses of the DTC. The depot was also one of the bus stations chosen to implement the new "cluster buses" system in the city, with the depot acting as a parking area for the privately owned buses.

=== Infrastructure ===
The depot was the only DTC depot which contained gates opening into three Delhi districts (East, North and South). The depot also contained numerous features and facilities such as eight washing pits, five parking centres (which also have scanning centres in them), a water tank each for drinking purposes and the Fire Department, four underground water tanks for washing buses, seven dormitories capable of holding 500 people, and two CNG stations (DTC buses run on CNG) utilised by 10 filling pumps. In addition, the depot also contained a Logistics Park consisting of a GPS-based logistical center to monitor trip plans, bus movements and locations, punctuality and regularity of all the buses; and a center used to train new drivers. For the Commonwealth Games, the police set up a command center and a cargo scanning center as well. The depot was equipped to repair 65 buses at a time. The depot was also fully secured with the surveillance of 37 CCTVs. Electricity was provided by an 11 KV electric substation present in the depot complex.

== Controversies ==
=== Duration of existence ===
The bus depot had initially been planned as a temporary structure, specifically for the Commonwealth Games. Permission from the Delhi Development Authority (DDA) had been obtained to this effect, and it had been stated that the depot would be "removed after the games". However, once the Games concluded, both the Delhi Government and the DTC refused to proceed with demolition measures for the depot; subsequently, it was reported that the DTC requested the DDA to change the land-use from "temporary" to "permanent". The construction of the depot was also described by some politicians as "wasteful expenditure".

=== Environment ===
The location of the bus depot (on the banks of the river, and near the Nizammuddin Bridge) was the subject of major controversy from environmentalists. Multiple NGOs and RTI activists strongly protested the location of the depot, citing that it violated Constitutional arrangements about protecting the environment. In addition, petitioners pointed out that the depot's location would be an environmental disaster, as the area was an important water recharge area and is an active floodplain.

=== Order of Removal ===
On 15 January 2014, Arvind Kejriwal, Chief Minister of Delhi, announced that the government would clear its stand on the controversial depot before the high court through an affidavit. The CM also announced that no further construction would be allowed on the river bed. Kejriwal stressed that it was not just a question of safeguarding the environment but also the important issue of ensuring that the city's natural resources are protected. "It is a catchment area for water which cannot be meddled with," he said. The Delhi Government said that it will take 9 months to shift it. The depot was built allegedly on the Yamuna riverbed, at a cost of Rs 60 crore, ahead of the Commonwealth Games held in 2010. Delhi Transport Corporation has told Delhi High Court that it will vacate the millennium depot site by 31 October 2014. As of 2023 the 60 acres of land used for the depot has been recovered. The DDC is planning on restoration of the land.
