= Telangana State Road Transport Corporation =

State-owned corporation

- Native name: Telaṅgāṇa Rāṣṭra Rōḍḍu Ravāṇā Sanstha
- Type: Public
- Industry: Public transport bus service
- Predecessor: Andhra Pradesh State Road Transport Corporation
- Founded: 3 June 2015 (11 years ago)
- Headquarters: Hyderabad, Telangana, India
- Number of locations: 11 Regions; 3 Zones; 97 Depots; 364 Bus Stations
- Area served: Intrastate (Primary Base): Telangana; Interstate: Andhra Pradesh; Chhattisgarh; Goa; Karnataka; Maharashtra
- Key people: Ponnam Prabhakar (Minister of Transport, Government of Telangana); Vacant (Chairman); Y. Nagi Reddy, IPS (Vice-Chairman and Managing Director)
- Services: Public transport; Logistic services
- Revenue: ▲₹130,400,000 (US$1.4 million)
- Owner: Government of Telangana
- Number of employees: 41,958 (March 2023)
- Parent: Ministry of Transport, Government of Telangana
- Website: TGSRTC official website

The Telangana State Road Transport Corporation (TGSRTC) is a state-owned corporation that runs bus transport services to and from the Indian state of Telangana. It was formed in 2014 by bifurcating the Andhra Pradesh State Road Transport Corporation. Many other Indian metro towns in Andhra Pradesh, Karnataka, Maharashtra, Goa, Odisha and Chhattisgarh are also linked with the TGSRTC services. It serves about 6 million passengers every day, having three zones and services operating through 99 depots.

TGSRTC Head Quaters, RTC X Roads, Hyderabad

== History ==
Road transport corporation in Telangana State was first established as NSRRTD (Nizam State Rail & Road Transport Department), a wing of Nizam State Railway in the erstwhile Hyderabad State, in 1932, with 27 buses and 166 employees. (APSRTC) was established on 11 January 1958 in pursuance of the Road Transport Corporations Act 1950. Consequent upon bifurcation of Andhra Pradesh state into Telangana and residual Andhra Pradesh, TSRTC operated as a separate entity from 3 June 2015 with a fleet of 10,500 buses, including 1,500 hired buses. The Government of Telangana subsequently established Telangana State Road Transport Corporation (TSRTC), on 27 March 2016, under the Road Transport Corporation Act, 1950. The Telangana government, on 31 July 2023, decided to merge Telangana State Road Transport Corporation with the government. On 23 May 2024, Government of Telangana decided to change the name from TSRTC to TGSRTC to avoid confusion with Tamilnadu State Express Transport Corporation.

== Divisions ==
TGSRTC has three zones: Hyderabad Rural (HR), Greater Hyderabad (GHz), and Karimnagar (KRMR). It is further subdivided into 11 regions and 25 divisions. It has a fleet of 9,094 buses, of which around 2,822 are hired vehicles. TGSRTC buses undertake operations on 36,593 routes.

== Types of services ==
TGSRTC operates a number of different kinds of services, both for urban transport as well as intercity and village transport.

=== Premium services ===
Air-conditioned buses are branded as "Vajra", "Garuda Plus", "Garuda" and "Rajadhani" (previously known as Indra), "Lahari" (A/c Sleeper).

- Vajra/Cyberliner

TGSRTC started its new service named Vajra with tag line 'Mobility Redefined' and 'Service At Doorstep'. These are the Mahindra's COSMO 3.3 Liter BS-IV AC Buses. The goal of Vajra was to reduce the hassle of commuters having to travel to a bus station in Hyderabad in order to board an intercity service. Vajra bridged that gap by providing intercity services from various colonies in Hyderabad to Warangal, Nizamabad, Godavarikhani and Karimnagar city. Few buses are renamed as 'Cyberliner', for the IT employees in the Hyderabad.

- Garuda Plus

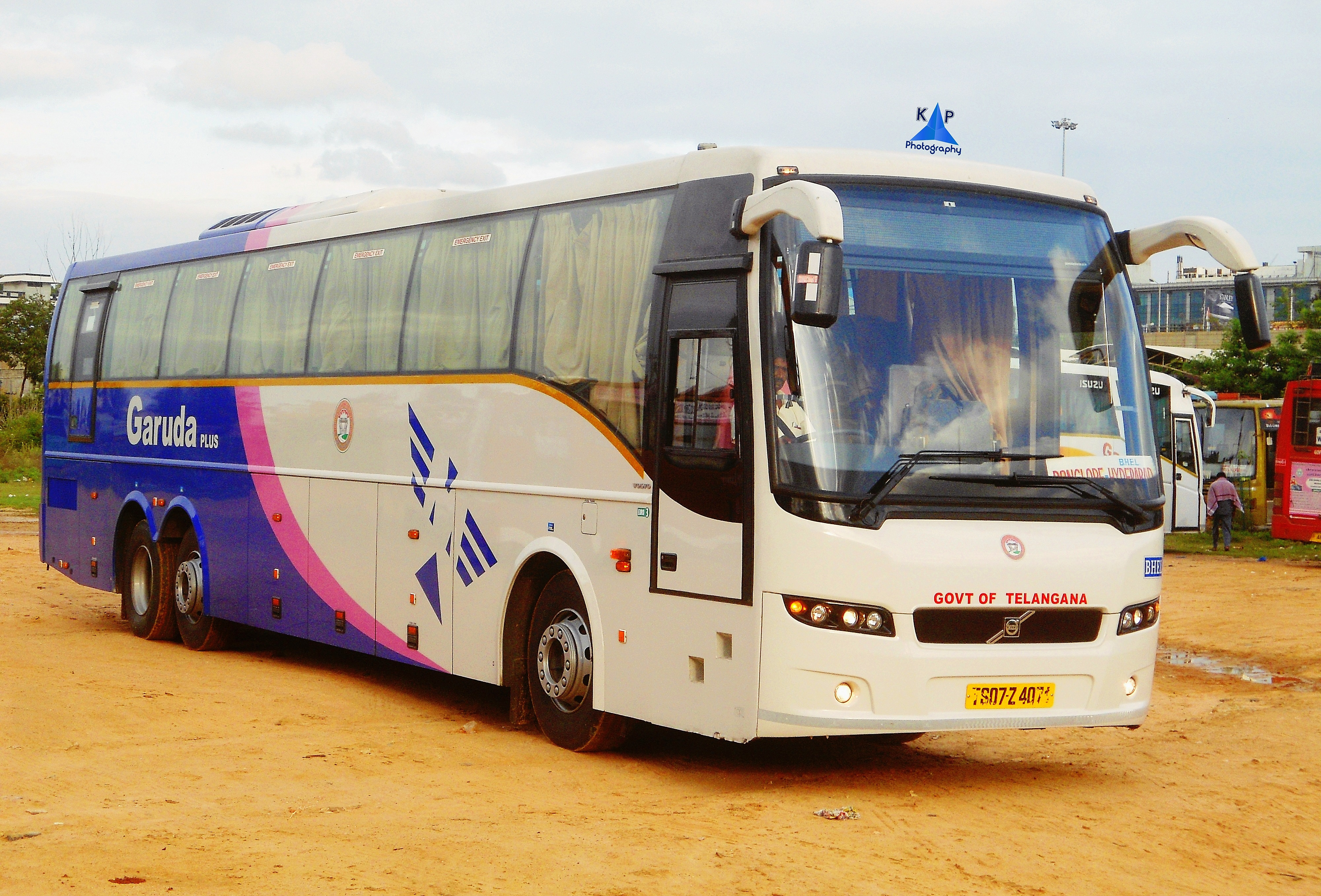
TSRTC GARUDA Plus VOLVO B9R

TGSRTC operates multi-axle buses of Mercedes-Benz, Volvo, and Scania branded as Garuda Plus buses. Designed for superior ride quality, these buses have reclining seats, while a few older buses also have calf rests. There are two/three LED TVs in each coach with pre-loaded movies depending on the make. As in Vennela, passengers are given a 500ml water bottle, a blanket and a packet of facial wipes. TGSRTC operates Garuda plus buses on intercity and interstate routes between urban centers such as Khammam-Bengaluru, Hyderabad-Adilabad, Hyderabad-Karimnagar, Hyderabad-Mumbai, Hyderabad-Vijayawada, Hyderabad-Bengaluru, Nizamabad-Bengaluru, Nizamabad-Tirupati, Warangal-Bengaluru, Godavarikhani-Bengaluru, Karimnagar-Bengaluru, Hyderabad-Pune, Hyderabad-Chennai, Hyderabad-Nagpur, Hyderabad-Bhadrachalam, Hyderabad-Kakinada.

- Garuda & E- Garuda

TGSRTC operates bi-axle buses of Volvo and Isuzu make branded as Garuda. There have been no additions to the fleet since 2009 apart from a few Vennela which were downgraded as Garuda. This class of service is being phased out. Designed for superior ride quality, these buses have reclining seats. As in Vennela, passengers are given a 500ml water bottle, a blanket and a packet of facial wipes. Some popular Garuda routes are Hyderabad-Warangal and Karimnagar, Vijayawada.

TGSRTC launched 10 Electric Intercity AC buses built by Olectra (CX2 model) which are branded as 'E-Garuda' on 16 May 2023. As of now these buses will ply between Hyderabad and Vijayawada.

- Rajadhani

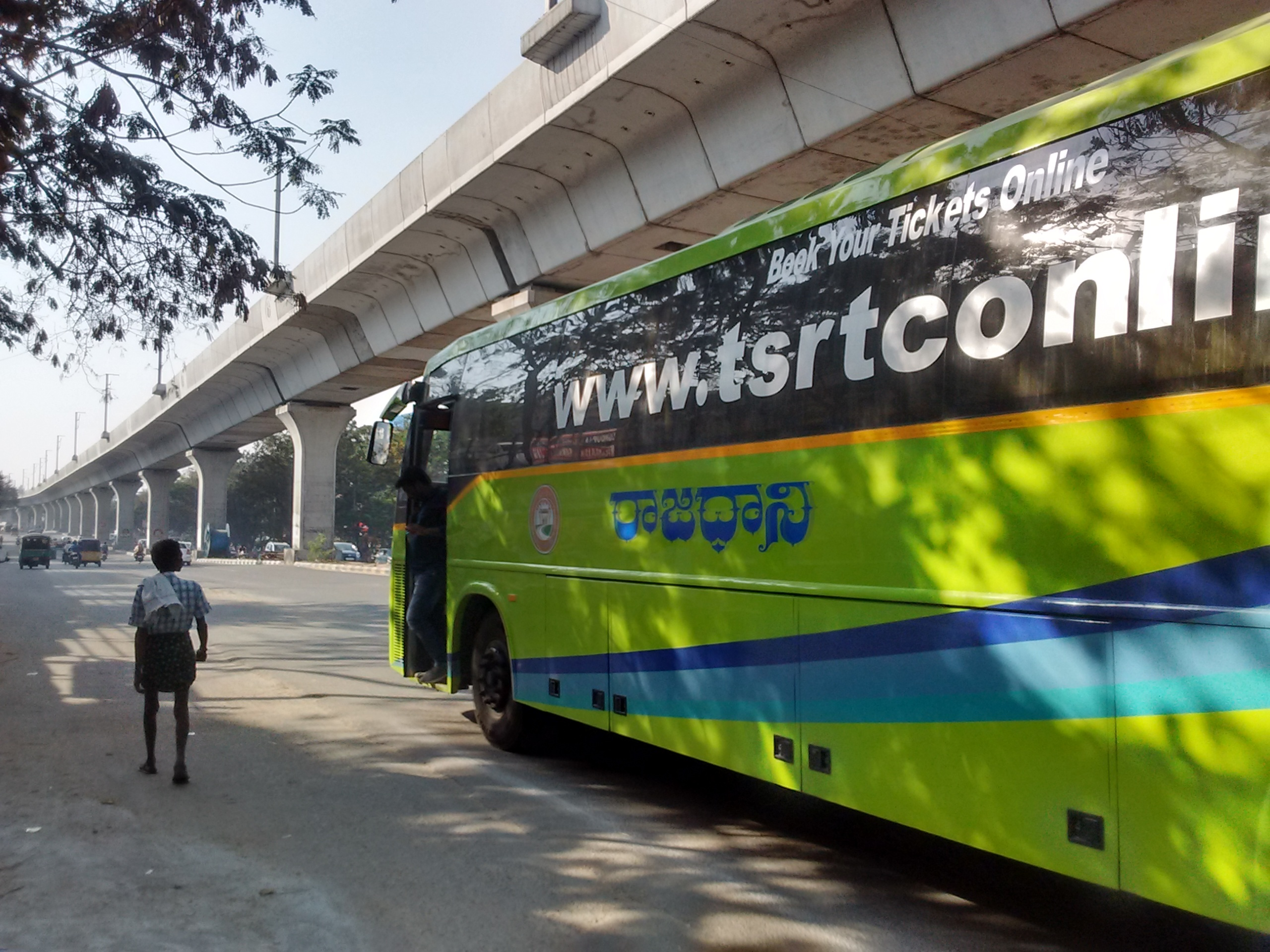
Rajadhani A/c

TGSRTC operates AC buses built on Ashok Leyland's 12M Viking chassis and Volvo 8400 City Buses branded as ''Rajadhani''. Introduced in 2011, these buses were earlier branded as Indra. Rajadhani buses act as a bridge between mid-level service "Super Luxury" and premium service "Garuda Plus". These buses are generally operated to state capital Hyderabad from various district headquarters. These are also operated on high-frequency long-distance routes. Only water bottles are provided in these buses.

- Lahari Sleeper

For the first time in the State, the TGSRTC has introduced sleeper buses(both A/c and Non-A/c) into its fleet for the convenience of passengers travelling long distances. These buses, which are AC sleeper are built on Ashok Leyland chassis and Non-A/c Sleeper cum seater are built on Eicher chassis. These buses have been named ‘Lahari’, which have been made available for the first time in the State, as an alternative to the services of private operators.

=== Mid-level services ===
Mid-level services are branded "Super Luxury", "Deluxe" and "Express".

- Super Luxury

These are non-air conditioned 2+2 push back services which are run from major cities. These are video coaches in which various movies are played. Most of the buses are of Ashok Leyland, Tata, Eicher etc. Recently Tsrtc, has started inducting its own BS6 stage buses into its fleet. The first batch of BS6 Super luxury buses built on Ashok Leyland chassis was inaugurated in the capital city of Telangana.

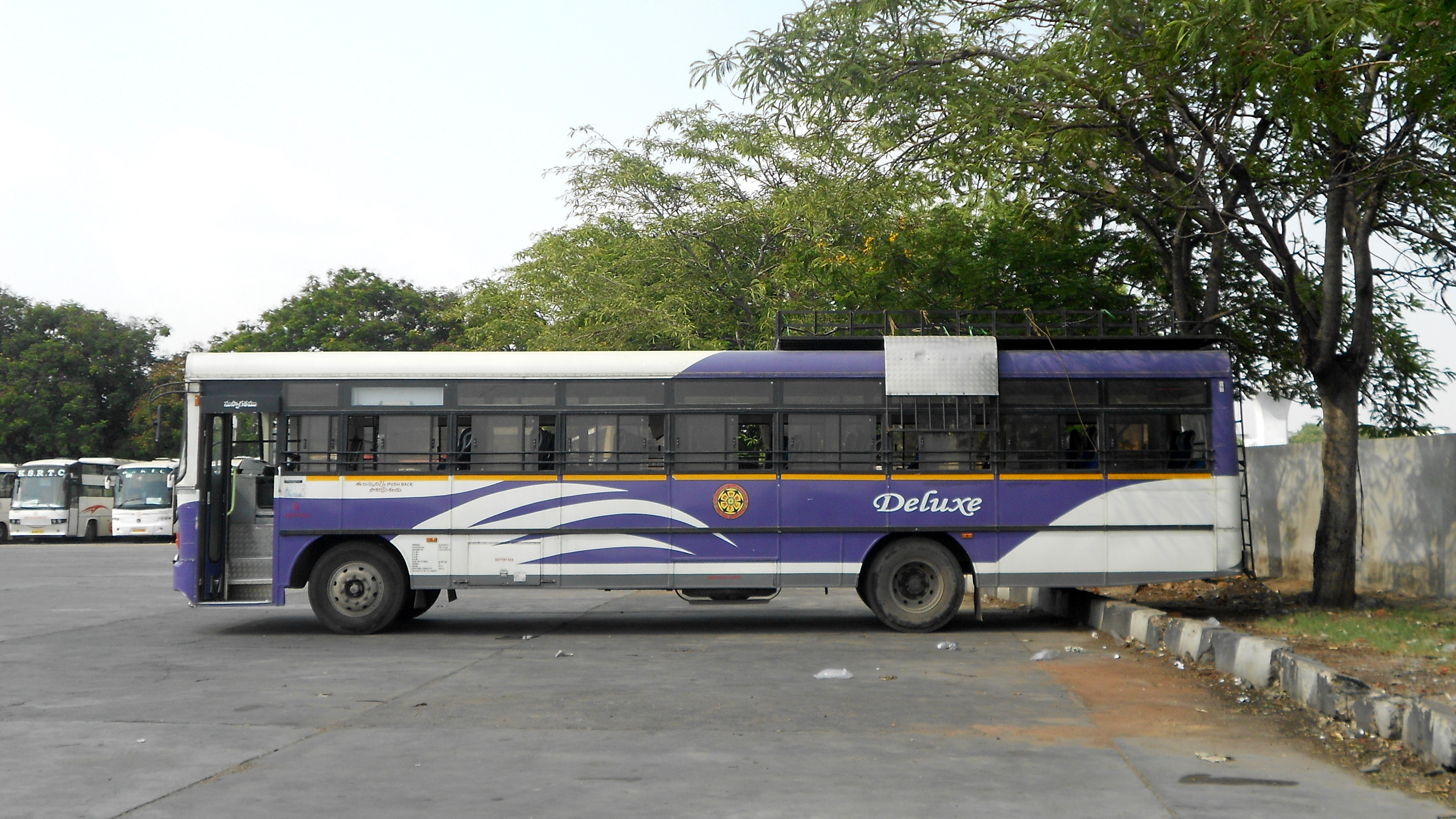
Deluxe Service

- Deluxe

These are non-air conditioned 2+2 services which are run as intercity services. The color of a Deluxe bus is violet. Most of the buses are of Ashok Leyland, Tata, Eicher, etc.

- Express and Semi Express

These are non-air conditioned 3+2 services which are run as intercity services. The color of an Express bus is light blue and dark blue. Most of the buses are of Ashok Leyland, Tata, and Eicher.

TSRTC runs city route buses in urban areas like Suryapet, Mahabubnagar, Siddipet, Godavarikhani and Khammam.

=== Entry-level services ===
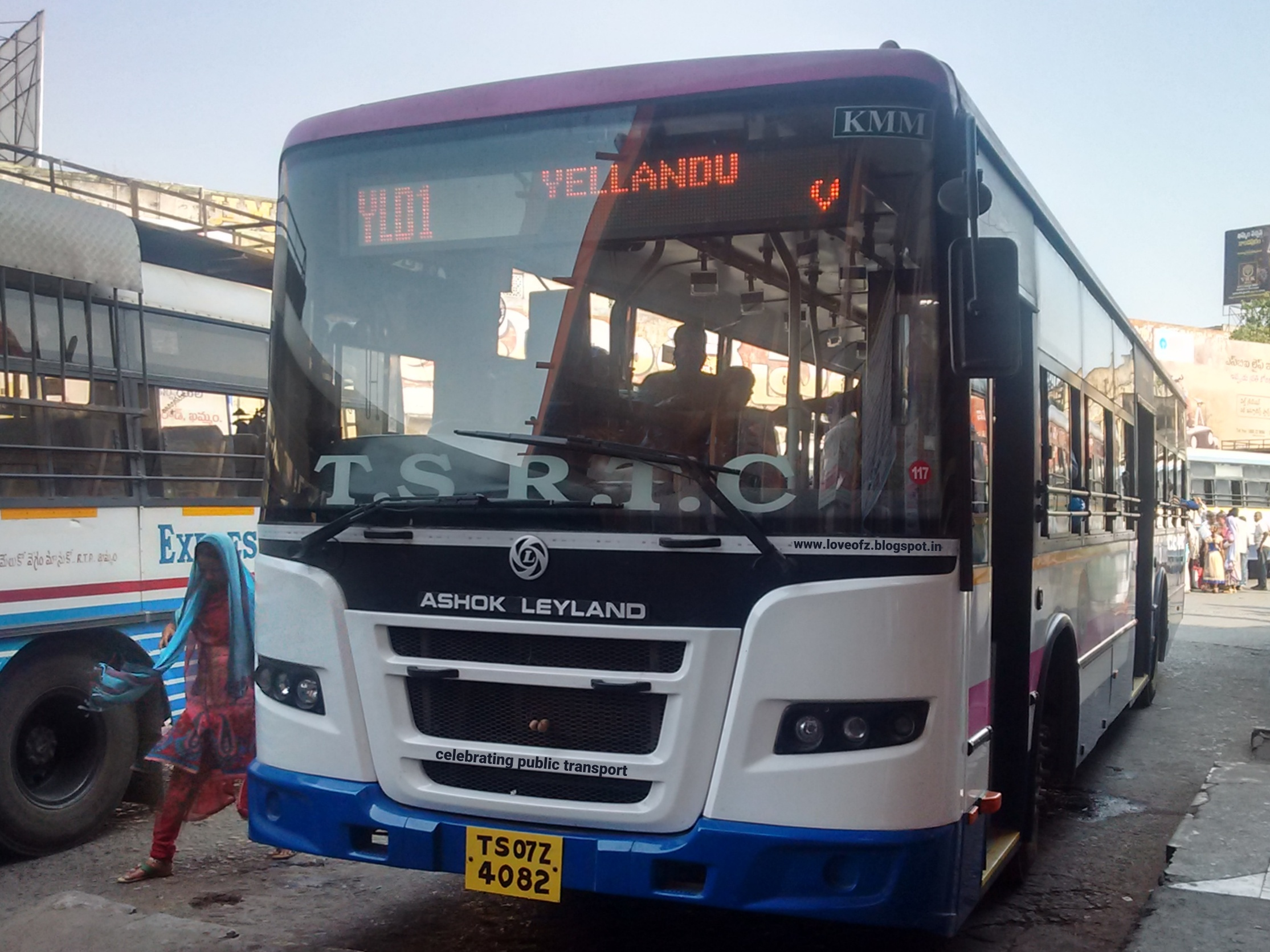
Metro Express

Entry-level ordinary service is branded as "Palle Velugu" and "Mini-Pallevelugu". These buses constitute the majority of TGSRTC's fleet, and are used to provide connectivity to villages and small towns. Palle Velugu are typically used on short routes connecting villages and small towns to larger towns.

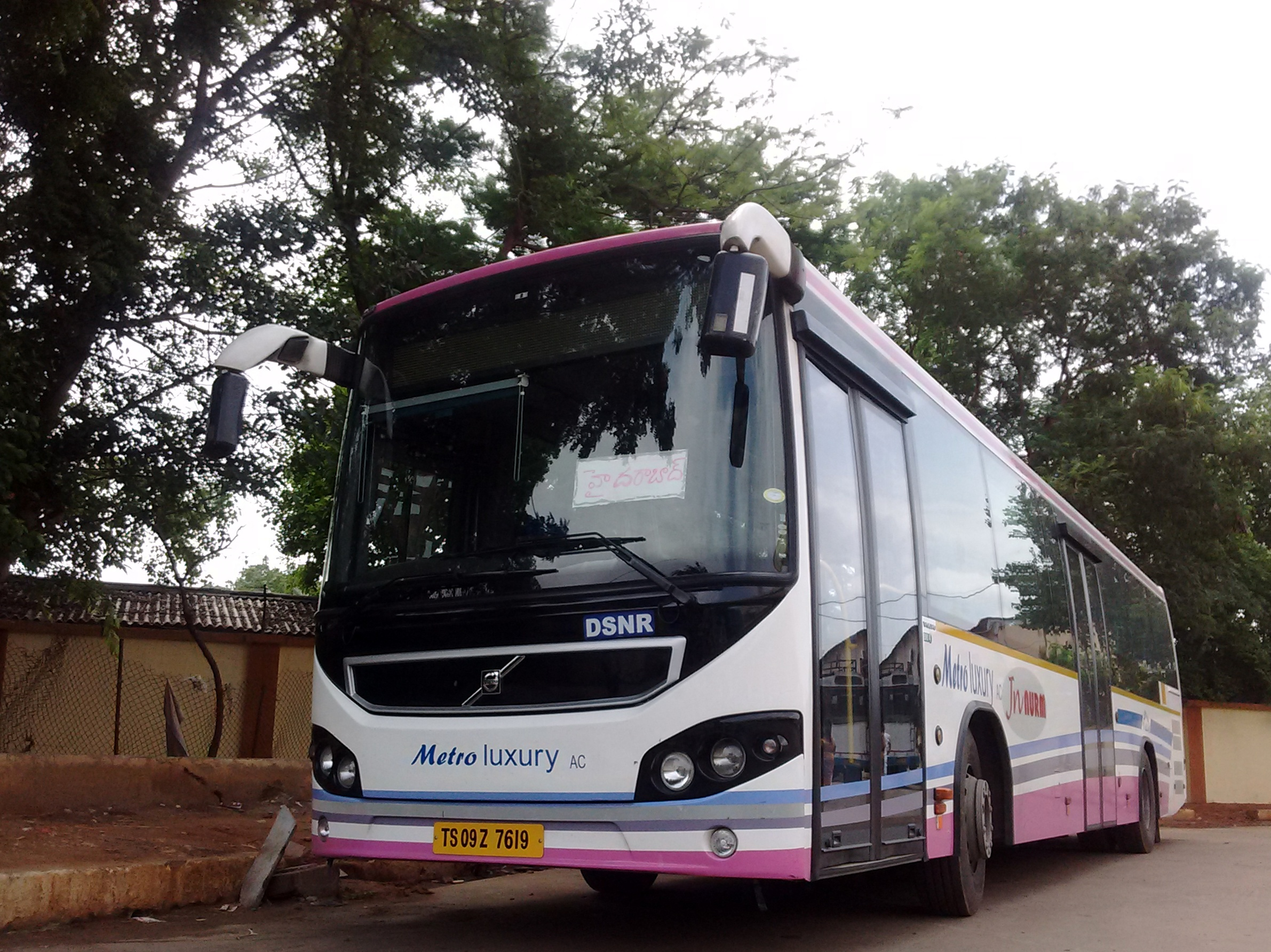
Hyd City Metro Luxury A/C

=== Urban services ===
City buses in Hyderabad and Warangal are also branded in a similar fashion. Air-conditioned city buses are branded "Metro Luxury". The city buses to Rajiv Gandhi International Airport (RGIA) are branded "Pushpak(Airport Liner)". Mid-level city services are branded "Metro Deluxe" and "Metro Express" whereas the entry-level "Ordinary" buses are not given any name but are commonly referred to as a "City Bus". These service categories should not be confused with local arrangements like "Merupu", "Trisul" and "Ramabanam".

=== Special Hire Services ===
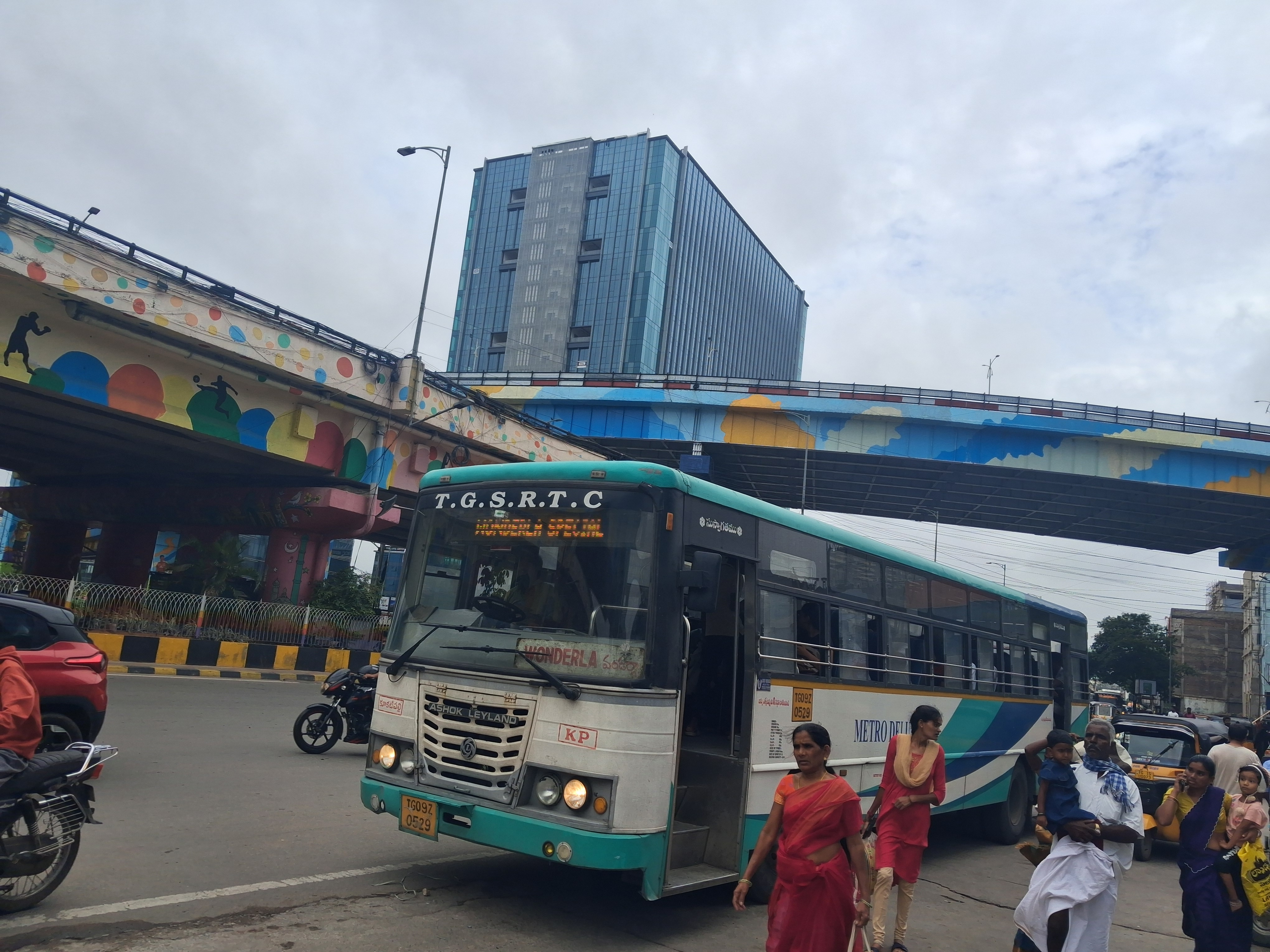
TGSRTC wonderla bus

TGSRTC also provides buses for special hire to individuals and organisations for any purpose such as tours, pilgrimage, marriage transport, excursions etc. All kinds of buses are available for Special Hire, each with their own tariff rate.

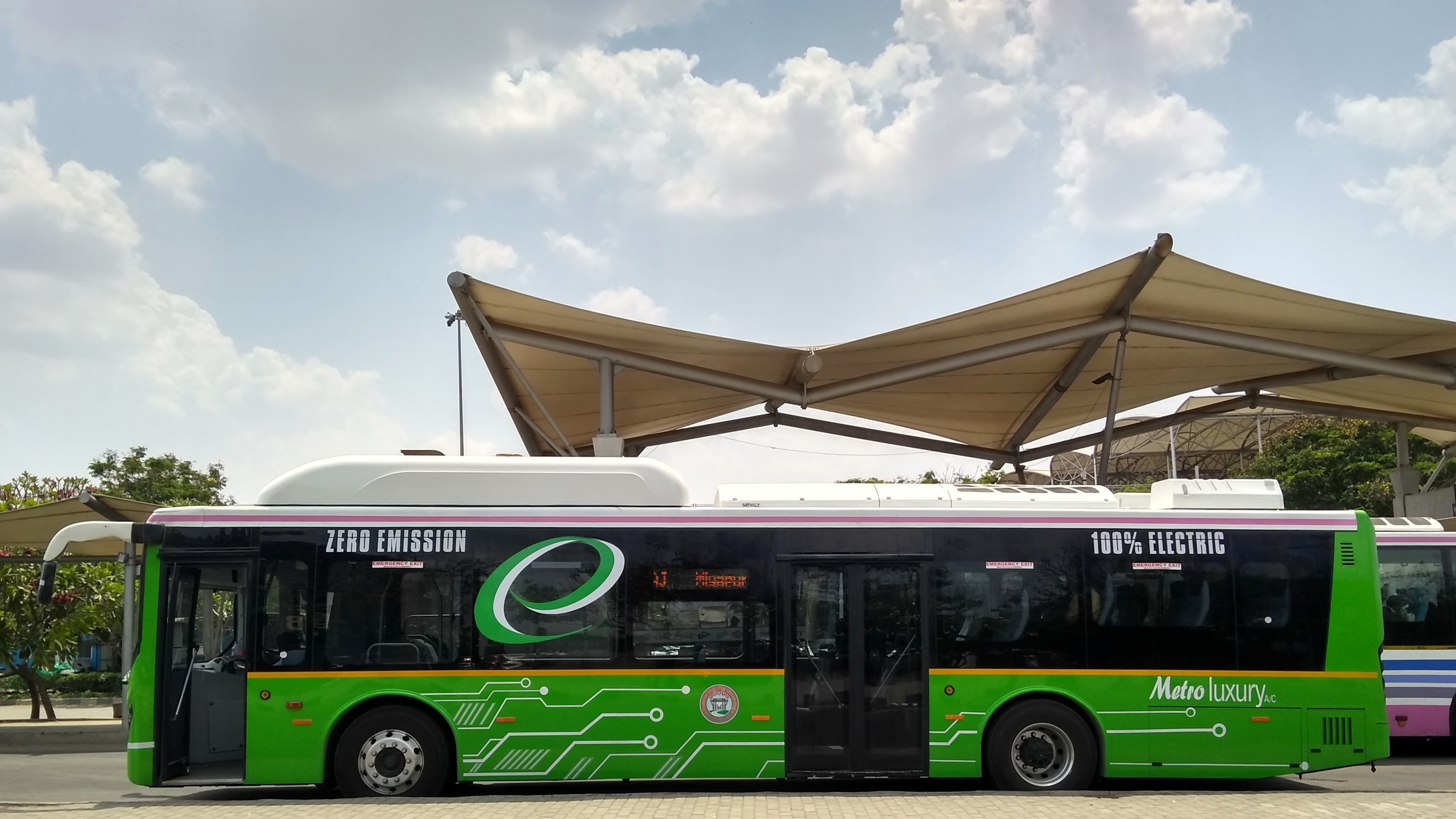
Pushpak Airport Liner

=== Electric Buses ===
Tgsrtc electric bus allwyn x road 216 kl route

TGSRTC inaugurated 40 Electric buses in the capital city, which is the first STU to add electric buses under FAME scheme and named it as the 'Pushpak Airport Liner', which has replaced the 'Tata Marcopolo AC' buses with 'Olectra BYD eBuzz K9' buses which connects the Hyderabad International Airport from different locations in the city. Additionally, in 2024, TSRTC launched electric bus services (i.e., e-METRO AC and e-CITY ORDINARY) on various routes from the Hyderabad Central University (HCU) and Secunderabad Cantonment depots.

On 10 December 2025, Telangana Transport Minister Ponnam Prabhakar flagged off 65 new 12-metre low-floor electric buses at Ranigunj Depot in Hyderabad, bringing the total delivered under TGSRTC’s 500-bus project to 325. Operated by Evey Trans, the air-conditioned buses feature lithium-ion batteries, real-time tracking, fire-suppression systems, USB charging, and accessibility for senior citizens and disabled passengers. The remaining buses are scheduled for delivery by January 2026.

==== Hyderabad Pushpak Airport Liner bus routes ====
The following is a list of the airport bus routes operated by TGSRTC in Hyderabad.

Route number	Origin	Destination
AJ Route	RGIA	Miyapur
AK Route	RGIA	Lingampally (Via Hafeezpet)
AL Route	RGIA	JBS (Via LB Nagar)
AC Route	RGIA	JBS (via Care hospital)
AA Route	RGIA	Secundrabad Railway Station (via Afzalgunj, MGBS)

=== Cargo Services ===
In June 2020, TGSRTC launched its Cargo Services division. These cargo vehicles were refabricated from older, retired passenger buses, and were launched with the goal of transporting governmental goods such as books, departmental materials, question papers and answer sheets for educational institutions and other goods being supplied by the government. Each depot has been supplied with 2 cargo vehicles, and are available for hire by private parties as well.

During the COVID-19 crisis, TGSRTC cargo vehicles were used extensively to transport pharmaceuticals and medicinal supplies, as well as farm goods, groceries, and other logistics for the government.

=== TGSRTC Tourism ===
TGSRTC offers Tourism Packages such as Singareni Darshan, Kaarthika Masam Divya Darshini, TTD Special Darshan, and more.

== Fleet ==
With the addition of 65 electric buses on December 10 , the overall electric buses's serving Hyderabad reached 325.

The below table consists of buses of TGSRTC in HYDERABAD which are owned and hired.

TGSRTC FLEET-Fleet
Name	Total
Vajra AC	8
Super Luxury	23
Metro Express	448
Metro Deluxe	275
E- Metro Express	167
City Ordinary	812

== Initiatives ==
The TGSRTC has introduced several initiatives aimed at improving services and facilities:

- Bio Mobile Toilets: TGSRTC has repurposed a few scrapped buses into bio mobile toilets, equipped with dedicated units for different users: one for transgender individuals, two for women and one for men. These mobile toilets will be stationed in high-footfall areas and locations hosting public gatherings across the state.
- Pushpak Airport Bus Live Tracking App: TGSRTC launched the Pushpak Airport bus live tracking app for city airport bus services. The app allows users to view route maps, live track buses, access bus numbers and check travel durations. It also features a "View on Map" option to track the real-time location of buses.
- TGSRTC College of Nursing: To meet the requirements of its hospital, TGSRTC established the TGSRTC College of Nursing. Starting from the academic year 2022–23, the college began offering nursing classes at the TGSRTC Hospital in Tarnaka. The hospital, which initially catered only to TGSRTC employees, now accepts out-patients from the general public.
- QR Code-based UPI Payments: In 2021, TGSRTC implemented QR code-based UPI payment systems at OPRS counters, cargo counters in Mahatma Gandhi Bus Station (MGBS) and Jubilee Bus Station (JBS), as well as at all bus pass counters in Hyderabad and Secunderabad.
- Gamyam App: TGSRTC has launched the Gamyam mobile application, which extends the live vehicle tracking system previously available for Pushpak Airport buses to all its services. The app offers a range of features, including driver and conductor details, route numbers, live bus tracking, nearby bus stops and route maps. Designed to cater to a wider audience, the app is available in both Telugu and English, ensuring accessibility and convenience for users.

== Awards and Achievements ==
- 2nd best STU at National Level in KMPL improvement during the period from October 2019 to September 2020
- TSRTC has been adjudged as “WINNER” in the category “(4) Initiatives taken for adoption of Fossil Fuel/EV vehicles /Alternative Fuel in public transport” for introduction of “Electric Vehicles”
- Telangana State Renewable Energy Development Corporation has presented Golden and Silver awards for the year 2019–20 on improvement in fuel efficiency
- Highest KMPL fuel efficiency for the year 2014-15
- Award for Excellence 2016 - Best Bus Transportation

== Accidents and incidents ==
- On 11 September 2018 India's worst bus tragedy took place in Telangana when a bus belonging to Jagtial depot was jam-packed with 88 passengers swerved off a ghat road and hurtled 30 feet down onto a valley at Sanivarampet killing 56 people and injuring 32 on board. The mishap occurred when bus driver Srinivas lost control over the wheel near Sanivarampet. Srinivas reportedly failed to slow down the vehicle as he failed to see a speed-breaker. When the bus hit the bump at high speed, Srinivas lost control over the wheel, resulting in the mishap. The vehicle rolled four times before falling onto the valley.

== Protest ==
From 5 October 2019, 48,000 employees stayed off work for a period of 52 days, protesting against hostile working environments, arbitrary pay cuts and loan denials, unsanitary workplaces, long working hours, as well as asking for a merger of the corporation into the state government.

The transport strike was met with solidarity from other unions such as the Teachers' Union, Employees Union, TNGO, TS TRANSCO etc.

The strike was met with brutal suppression from the state government and Telangana Police, who fired non lethal rounds into crowds of protestors, as well as taking a large number of them into custody.

Unable to continue amid the brutal suppression, the workers were finally forced into calling off the strike on 25 November.
