= 2019–2024 Amaravati protests =

Protests against decentralisation in Amaravati

- Date: 18 December 2019 – 12 June 2024 (6 years, 9 months and 7 days)
- Location: Andhra Pradesh, India
- Caused by: Introduction of Andhra Pradesh Decentralisation and Inclusive Development of All Regions Bill, 2020; Proposal of the Government decentralization, and the theory of three capitals similar to South Africa; Suggestions of G. N. Rao, BCG Committees to have decentralized government; Comments by Botsa Satyanarayana; Police brutality at Amaravati
- Goals: Full repeal of the Andhra Pradesh Decentralisation and Inclusive Development of All Regions Act, 2020; Amaravati to be retained as the sole capital of the state; Development of Amaravati as capital city of the state; Intervention of PM Narendra Modi, and President Ramnath Kovind; Implementation of President's rule in Andhra Pradesh; Release of arrested protesters; Establishment of judicial enquiry on insider trading issue
- Methods: Protestors: demonstrations, dharna, hunger strike, general strike, picketing, sloganeering, satyagraha, hashtag activism Authorities: arrests by police, Riot police, vandalism, lathi charge, mass arrest, house arrest, transport restrictions, imposing ban on assembly (Section 144)
- Status: Ongoing protests in accordance with the restrictions due to pandemic situation. Previously: Section 144, Curfew imposed across Andhra Pradesh Capital Region.; Multiple Police forces have been deployed in Amaravati.
- Concessions: A High Power Committee has been allotted to discuss the committee reports and to take further decision on Amaravati.; The bill was referred to Select committee by the Andhra Pradesh Legislative Council.; The Andhra Pradesh High Court ordered the government and police forces to allow the protestors to protest peacefully against the action of the government.; The Andhra Pradesh High Court directed the state government not to shift any of its offices to any other place and argued to maintain status quo on the issues.

Parties
India; Authorities; Government of Andhra Pradesh; Andhra Pradesh Legislative Assembly; Andhra Pradesh Legislative Council; Andhra Pradesh Secretariat; Andhra Pradesh Police; Vijayawada City Police; Supported by: YSR Congress Party; Other Organisations: YSRCP Student's Union; Bar Association of Kurnool	Protesters: (no centralised authority): Multiple groups of citizens throughout Andhra Pradesh; Farmers of Guntur and Krishna districts; Amaravati Parirakshana Samithi; Andhra Pradesh JAC Union; Rythu Aikya Karyacharana Samithi; Amaravati Mahila JAC Union; Rajadhani Rythu Parirakshana Samithi; Students Federation of India; All India Students Association; Telugu Nadu Students Federation; Andhra Pradesh Mahila Congress; Telugu Mahila; NRI groups across the world; Supported by: Telugu Desam Party; Jana Sena Party; Bharatiya Janata Party; Indian National Congress; Communist Party of India (Marxist); Communist Party of India; Communist Party of India (Marxist-Leninist) Liberation; Other Organisations: Telugu Association of North America; Lorry Owners’ Association of Krishna; Bar Association of Krishna; Bar Association of Guntur

Lead figures
Government of Andhra Pradesh: Y. S. Jaganmohan Reddy (Chief minister); Botsa Satyanarayana (Minister of Municipal administration and Urban development); Buggana Rajendranath (Minister of Finance and Legislative affairs)	Protesters (no centralised leadership)

Deaths, injuries and arrests
- Deaths: 58
- Injuries: Around 200
- Arrested: 200+

The 2019–2024 Amaravati protests, simply known as Amaravati protests, were demonstrations in the Indian state of Andhra Pradesh triggered by the idea of changing the one capital of Amaravati already identified and developed partially, to three capitals of Amaravati, Visakhapatnam and Kurnool by the Government of Andhra Pradesh. This led to concerns that the decision would create chaos and insecurity for farmers who gave their fertile agricultural lands to the government in 29 villages of Guntur district. The protests began in Mandadam, Thullur, Uddandarayunipalem on 18 December 2019. In a few days, the protests spread across Andhra Pradesh Capital Region, in Andhra Pradesh. On 17 December 2020, series of events were done to mark the protests' anniversary.

The 1,631-days long protests ended on 12 June 2024. The decision was taken after N. Chandrababu Naidu was sworn-in as the chief minister of Andhra Pradesh for the fourth time on this day, and announced that Amaravati will be continued as the capital of Andhra Pradesh.

== Background ==
=== 2014–2018 ===
The TDP government (2014-19) claimed to build the region into a world-class capital city reflecting the state's historical and cultural heritage. It was designed by the Singaporean company, with the masterplan being prepared by two Singapore government appointed consultants and other international consultants in association with both governments in order to develop India's Singapore.

The foundation stone was laid for Amaravati, by the Prime Minister of India Narendra Modi, Former Chief minister Nara Chandrababu Naidu and the Former Chief Justice of India Ranjan Gogoi has laid foundation stone for Andhra Pradesh High Court at Amaravati. However, the Capital city was planned in rich fertile coastal plains on the banks of Krishna River; about 60 km from Bay of Bengal and said to be designed to have 51% of green spaces and 10% of water bodies. Thus, the new riverfront capital took away eminently cultivable land from farmers. For the first time in India, the farmers of Guntur and Krishna districts had given 33,000 acres of land, to the Government of Andhra Pradesh on land pooling for Amaravati. It had tied up around Rs 17,500 crore with the Housing and Urban Development Corporation, World Bank, Andhra Bank, Asian Infrastructure Investment Bank and planned to raise the balance through public-private partnerships, investments, bonds, lease rental discounting also, it had estimated a budget of over Rs 1 lakh crore for the greenfield capital city. The Government of India, has granted only 2,500 crore and further promised to grant more in future. But, the present government had stopped major projects and contracts backed by APCRDA and Andhra Pradesh Development Corporation Limited (ADCL), stating that the previous government has committed Abuse of information, Insider trading on several properties in Amaravati. Many construction works and road works at amaravati have come to a grinding halt, even as those undertaken by private companies continue albeit slowly, as the government had appointed several committees for review.

=== 2019–2024 ===
In July 2019, the World bank dropped the $300 million Amaravati capital project, and released statement that says "India withdrawn request for financing Amaravati project." After the World bank, Beijing-based Asian Infrastructure Investment Bank has also withdrawn $200 million funding for the Amaravati capital city project and leads the state government into financial crisis for construction of Amaravati.

In November 2019, the Singapore consortium comprising Ascendas-Singbridge and Sembcorp withdrew from the capital city startup area project, after the state government decided not to proceed with the project owing to its other priorities. On building the capital city at Amaravati, Urban development minister Botsa Satyanarayana had said: "Our priority is not to build London or Paris. It is not our priority and not in our capacity also. It is not possible for us to build" and had stated that the Amaravati region was not conducive for building a greenfield capital city and that it was prone to floods. Citing the financial condition of Andhra Pradesh due to the economic slowdown and alleged misdeeds of the previous regime, Finance minister Buggana Rajendranath had expressed inability to continue work on several large projects of Amaravati conceived by the previous government.

In December 2019, Chief minister Y. S. Jaganmohan Reddy announced that the Andhra Pradesh would have three capitals namely as Amaravati in Coastal Andhra as the legislative capital with the state assembly, Visakhapatnam in Uttarandhra as the administrative capital with the state secretariat and Kurnool in Rayalaseema as the judicial capital with the high court. This threw everybody into confusion, including foreign investors who had hedged their bets on the swift development of Amaravati. The farmers, residents of APCR have condemned the comments and dragged into protests against the government.

The act has been challenged in Andhra Pradesh High Court, which ordered to maintain status quo until the court completes its hearing. The government, led by Y. S. Jagan Mohan Reddy, withdrew the act, when the high court hearing reached the final stage. The chief minister, however, said his government would bring a better and more complete bill.

The protesters under the banner of Amaravati Parirakshana Samithi (APS) and Joint Action Committee (JAC) of Amaravati received support from all the political parties barring the ruling YCP when they held their long marches across Andhra Pradesh seeking support for their agitation.

On 5 March 2022, High court ruled that the government can not abandon development of Amaravati as capital city after farmers parted with 33,000 acres of land against the agreement with APCRDA to develop it as the capital city and ₹15,000 crore was sunk in it over development expenditure. It asked the government to develop Amaravati within six months. When the government appealed in the Supreme court, it got a stay on the judgement regarding developing the city within six months. Supreme court posted the case to 11 July 2023 for hearing.

Meanwhile, Jaganmohan Reddy announced that Visakhapatnam will become the new capital when he addressed a meeting on 31 January 2023, relating to an upcoming investment summit in Vizag. The Supreme court is set to hear it in April 2024, following its decision on 3 January 2024 about the government's request for expedited hearing.

== Timeline ==
=== Timeline of the events ===
- 2 June 2014

- The Andhra Pradesh bifurcated by carving out the new state called, Telangana.

- 8 June 2014

- Chandrababu Naidu became chief minister of Andhra Pradesh and took office of residuary Andhra Pradesh.

- 31 December 2014

- The Government of Andhra Pradesh notified an area covering 7068 sq. km as the broader Andhra Pradesh Capital Region and the 122 sq. km as the Capital City region.

- The Andhra Pradesh Capital Region Development Authority Act, 2014 came into force.

- 1 April 2015

- Andhra Pradesh cabinet approved the decision to name the capital city as Amaravati.

- 25 May 2015

- The Singapore Government has offered the master plan for Amaravati.

- 22 October 2015

- The Prime Minister Narendra Modi has laid foundation stone for the new capital Amaravati along with Chandrababu Naidu, K. Chandrasekhar Rao, Nirmala Sitharaman and Venkaiah Naidu on Amaravati foundation ceremony.

- 1 July 2017

- Chief minister, ministers and senior officers had officially started functioning from Amaravati.

- 3 February 2019

- The Chief Justice of India Ranjan Gogoi has inaugurated the High Court of Andhra Pradesh at Amaravati.

- 18 March 2019

- The Andhra Pradesh High Court have commenced operations from Amaravati.

- 30 May 2019

- Chandrababu Naidu have lost the elections and Jaganmohan Reddy's YSR Congress formed new government.

- 23 July 2019

- World Bank, Asian Infrastructure Investment Bank have announced pulling out of Amaravati project.

- 13 September 2019

- The New Government appointed, an Expert panel committee headed by G.N. Rao to take a review of the developmental plans initiated in Amaravati and also to suggest comprehensive development strategy for all-round development of the state including the capital.

- 11 November 2019

- The Singapore government backed consortium have dropped the Amaravati startup area project.

- 17 December 2019

- Jagan had announced the three capital proposal in the Andhra Pradesh Legislative Assembly by taking South Africa's capital model into consideration.

- 20 December 2019

- The six-member expert panel comprising urban planning experts, have submitted its report to the Chief minister Jaganmohan Reddy.

- G. N. Rao further stated that, the panel suggested moving 'some of the capital functions' to other areas in form of Decentralized Government.

- 29 December 2019

- The Government of Andhra Pradesh also constituted a High power committee to discuss on G. N. Rao Panel and BCG group reports due to widespread public blacklash.

- 3 January 2020

- The Boston Consulting Group had submitted the report to the government and supported the idea of three capitals.

- 31 July 2020

- Biswabhusan Harichandan, Governor of Andhra Pradesh approved the repeal of APCRDA and Andhra Pradesh Decentralisation bill

- 17 December 2020

- Public meeting is held near the foundation ceremony area (Uddandarayunipalem) to commemorate the one year anniversary of the protests.

- 23 November 2021

- The state government withdrew the 3-capital bill, leading protesters to believe that the government had given in to their demands. However, hours later, Chief minister Jaganmohan Reddy announced that the government would write a "better and more comprehensive" 3-capital bill.

- 3 March 2022

- The Andhra Pradesh High Court directs the state government to develop Amaravati as the sole capital. However, this is not recognized by the state government.

- 12 September 2022

- Amaravati Protests turns 1000 days.
- Farmers began Maha Padayatra across Andhra Pradesh. The protests which began in Amaravati will end on 11 November 2022 at the Arasavalli Sun Temple.

- 28 November 2022

- The Supreme Court of India stays the previous decision by the Andhra Pradesh High Court to develop Amaravati as the sole capital, stating, "Is there no separation of power in the state of Andhra Pradesh? How can a high court begin acting executive?"

=== Timeline of the protests ===
- 17 December 2019

- Hours after Jagan's announcement, violent demonstrations erupt in Amaravati, especially in Thullur, and other areas in the capital region.

- 18 December 2019

- Farmers held demonstrations on the roads with the cans of pesticides by citing suicide if the Jagan's decision wouldn't withdrawn.

- Thousands of farmers and labour union leaders had called for bandh across Mandadam, Velagapudi, Venkatapalem, Krishnayapalem.

- 19 December 2019

- Various public and private departments, stores had openly supported the bandh, and heavy traffic jam obstructed many government vehicles as protestors gathered on the roads.
- Protestors also blocked APSRTC buses moving towards Andhra Pradesh Secretariat and Amaralingeswara temple despite the deployment of a huge posse of police in the 29 villages.

- 11 October 2020

- Various farmers, and members of the Amaravati Mahila JAC hold a rally from Thullur and raising slogans of 'Jai Amaravati'.
- Devineni Uma Maheswara Rao participated in a farmers' rally held at Mylavaram.

- 15 December 2022

- APCC President Gidugu Rudra Raju made a visit to the Vijayawada railway station, in solidarity with the protesters.

== Protests and demonstrations ==
Amaravati farmers took to the streets with the announcement of Chief minister Jagan's capital decentralization. Reactionary protests were held as well across the Guntur and Krishna districts of Andhra Pradesh. They are protesting on the road with cans of pesticides and have erred in moving the Secretariat and High Court from the already all-encompassing Amaravati. Farmers are demanding that the entire administration of government to stay where it is.

== In popular culture ==
Rajadhani Files, Telugu movie was inspired by the events around Amaravati protests.

== See also ==
- 2006 Indian anti-reservation protests
- 2019 Andhra Pradesh Legislative Assembly election
- List of protests in the 21st century
- Assam Movement
- Samaikyandhra Movement
- Telangana Movement
