= Thullur mandal =

- Mandal
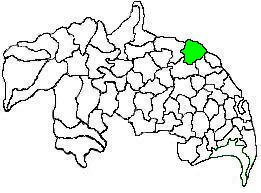
- Mandal map of Guntur district showing Thullur mandal (in green)
- Interactive Map Outlining mandal
- Location in Andhra Pradesh, India
- Coordinates: 16.5275°N 80.4681°E
- Country: India
- State: Andhra Pradesh
- District: Guntur
- Headquarters: Thullur

Government
  - Tehsildar: M.T.Venkateswarlu

Area
  - Total: 195.41 km^{2} (75.45 sq mi)

Population (2011)
  - Total: 54,081
  - Density: 276.76/km^{2} (716.80/sq mi)

Languages
  - Official: Telugu
- Time zone: UTC+5:30 (IST)
- PIN: 522237
- Vehicle registration: AP

Thullur mandal is one of the 18 mandals in Guntur district of the Indian state of Andhra Pradesh. It is under the administration of Guntur Revenue Division and the headquarters are located at Thullur. The mandal is situated on the banks of Krishna River, bounded by Amaravathi, Tadikonda, Tadepalle and Mangalagiri mandals. The mandal is also a part of the capital city of Andhra Pradesh. 18 villages from the mandal fall under the jurisdiction of Andhra Pradesh Capital City.

== Demographics ==
As of 2011 census, the mandal had a population of 54,081. The total population constitute, 26,791 males and 27,290 females —a sex ratio of 1019 females per 1000 males. 5,403 children are in the age group of 0–6 years, of which 2,758 are boys and 2,645 are girls —a ratio of 959 per 1000. The average literacy rate stands at 66.93% with 32,578 literates.km

== Towns and villages ==
As of 2011 census of India, the mandal has 21 villages. Of which, 18 villages namely, Abbarajupalem, Ainavolu, Ananthavaram, Borupalem, Dondapadu, Kondamarajupalem, Lingayapalem, Malkapuram, Mandadam, Nekkallu, Nelapadu, Pitchikalapalem, Rayapudi, Sakhamuru, Thullur, Uddandarayunipalem, Velagapudi and Venkatapalem were de–notified and became part of Urban Notified Area of Amaravati. Hence, the mandal has only 3 villages viz., Harischandrapuram, Pedaparimi and Vaddamanu, which falls under the jurisdiction of APCRDA.

== Administration ==
The mandal is under the control of a tahsildar and the present tahsildar is M.T.Venkateswarlu. Thullur mandal is one of the 4 mandals under Tadikonda (SC) (Assembly constituency), which in turn represents Guntur (Lok Sabha constituency) of Andhra Pradesh.

== Education ==
The mandal plays a major role in education for the rural students of the nearby villages. The primary and secondary school education is imparted by government, aided and private schools, under the School Education Department of the state. As per the school information report for the academic year 2015–16, the mandal has more than 6,491 students enrolled in over 61 schools.

== See also ==
- List of mandals in Andhra Pradesh
- Villages in Thullur mandal
