= Tadikonda =

- Village
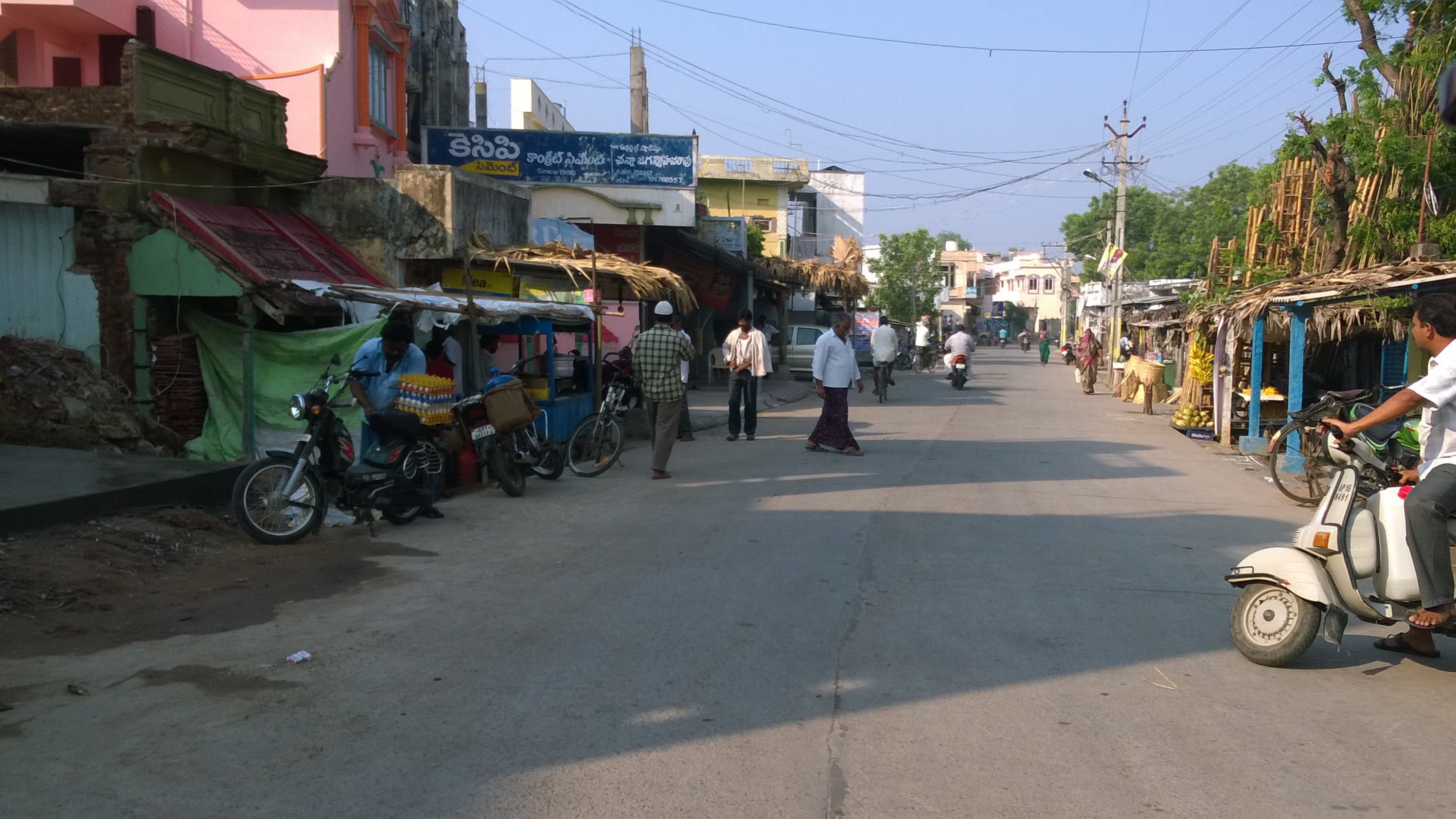
- Tadikonda Main Road
- Interactive map of Tadikonda
- Location in Andhra Pradesh, India
- Coordinates: 16.41667°N 80.45417°E
- Country: India
- State: Andhra Pradesh
- District: Guntur
- Mandal: Tadikonda

Government
  - Type: Panchayati raj
  - Body: Tadikondagram panchayat

Area
  - Total: 5,179 ha (12,800 acres)

Population (2011)
  - Total: 18,505
  - Density: 357.3/km^{2} (925.4/sq mi)

Languages
  - Official: Telugu
- Time zone: UTC+5:30 (IST)
- PIN: 522xxx
- Area code: +91–8663
- Vehicle registration: AP 39 , AP 40
- Lok Sabha constituency: Guntur
- Assembly constituency: Tadikonda

Tadikonda is a village in Guntur district of the Indian state of Andhra Pradesh. Tadi- wet, konda - mountain. It is located in Tadikonda mandal of Guntur revenue division. It forms a part of Andhra Pradesh Capital Region.

== Demographics ==
As of 2018 census, Tadikonda village has population of 18505 of which 9119 are males while 9386 are females. Average Sex Ratio of Tadikonda village is 1029 which is higher than Andhra Pradesh state average of 993. The population of children with age 0-6 is 1704 which makes up 9.21 % of total population of village. Child Sex Ratio for the Tadikonda as per census is 1007, higher than Andhra Pradesh average of 939. Literacy rate of Tadikonda village was 71.17 % compared to 67.02 % of Andhra Pradesh.

== Government and politics ==
Tadikonda gram panchayat is the local self-government of the village. It is divided into wards and each ward is represented by a ward member. The ward members are headed by a Sarpanch.

== Transport ==
Tadikonda lies on Thulluru-Guntur route. A.P.S.R.T.C., the state-owned road transport corporation, operates bus services from Guntur. Buses plying to Vaddamanu, Thullur, Velagapudi (Secretariat) and High Court (Nelapadu) pass through the village.

== See also ==
- List of villages in Guntur district
