= Dokka Manikya Vara Prasad =

Indian politician (born 1962)

Member of Legislative Council Andhra Pradesh
- In office 30 March 2017 – 29 March 2023
- Constituency: Elected by MLAs

Member of Legislative Assembly Andhra Pradesh
- In office 2004–2014
- Preceded by: J. R. Pushpa Raju
- Succeeded by: Tenali Sravan Kumar
- Constituency: Tadikonda

Personal details
- Born: 5 March 1962 (age 64) Pulipadu, Guntur, Andhra Pradesh
- Party: Telugu Desam Party (2024- Present) (2014- 2020)
- Other political affiliations: YSR Congress Party (2020- 2024); Indian National Congress (2004-2014)
- Children: Divya (Daughter); Lohith (Son); Joel (Son)

Dokka Manikya Vara Prasada Rao (born 5 March 1962) is an Indian politician and he was former spokesperson of INC in Andhra Pradesh & recently he joined YSR Congress Party. He is prominent Madiga leader. He was an MLA (2009–2014) from Tadikonda constituency.

== Early life ==
Born to Dokka Deva Bhiksham and Lolamma on 5 March 1962 at Pulipadu Village, Gurazala Mandal in Guntur District, Andhra Pradesh, Dokka Manikya Varaprasada Rao completed his high school and college education respectively in Zilla Parisdhad High School and Government Junior College, Gurazala of Guntur district. He did graduation in science in SKBR Degree College, Macherla. He is a law graduate from Andhra Christian College of Law, Guntur and he has also obtained L.L.M. from Acharya Nagarjuna University. At present he is doing PhD on "Secularism and Indian Constitution" from Osmania University, Hyderabad.

== Career ==
He quit his position as Legal Officer in South Central Railways and entered into politics as Congress worker inspired by the ideology and activities of the Party. He led the Congress Forum for Intellectuals and played a key role in presenting various important papers on the policies and programs of the congress party. He never hesitated to make the people representatives of all bodies to realise their duties towards the public who elected them.

He was elected to the Andhra Pradesh Legislative Assembly from Tadikonda Constituency in 2004. As MLA he took up various developmental activities in his Constituency. He won this first election from Tadikonda Assembly constituency. He worked as secondary educational minister and later he was Rural Development and National Rural Employment Guarantee Scheme (NREGS) Minister in the cabinet of Government of Andhra Pradesh before bifurcation from 2009 to 2011. After bifurcation he did not contest the general elections held for Andhra Pradesh State in 2014.
