= Andhra Pradesh Capital Region Development Authority =

Development authority in Andhra Pradesh

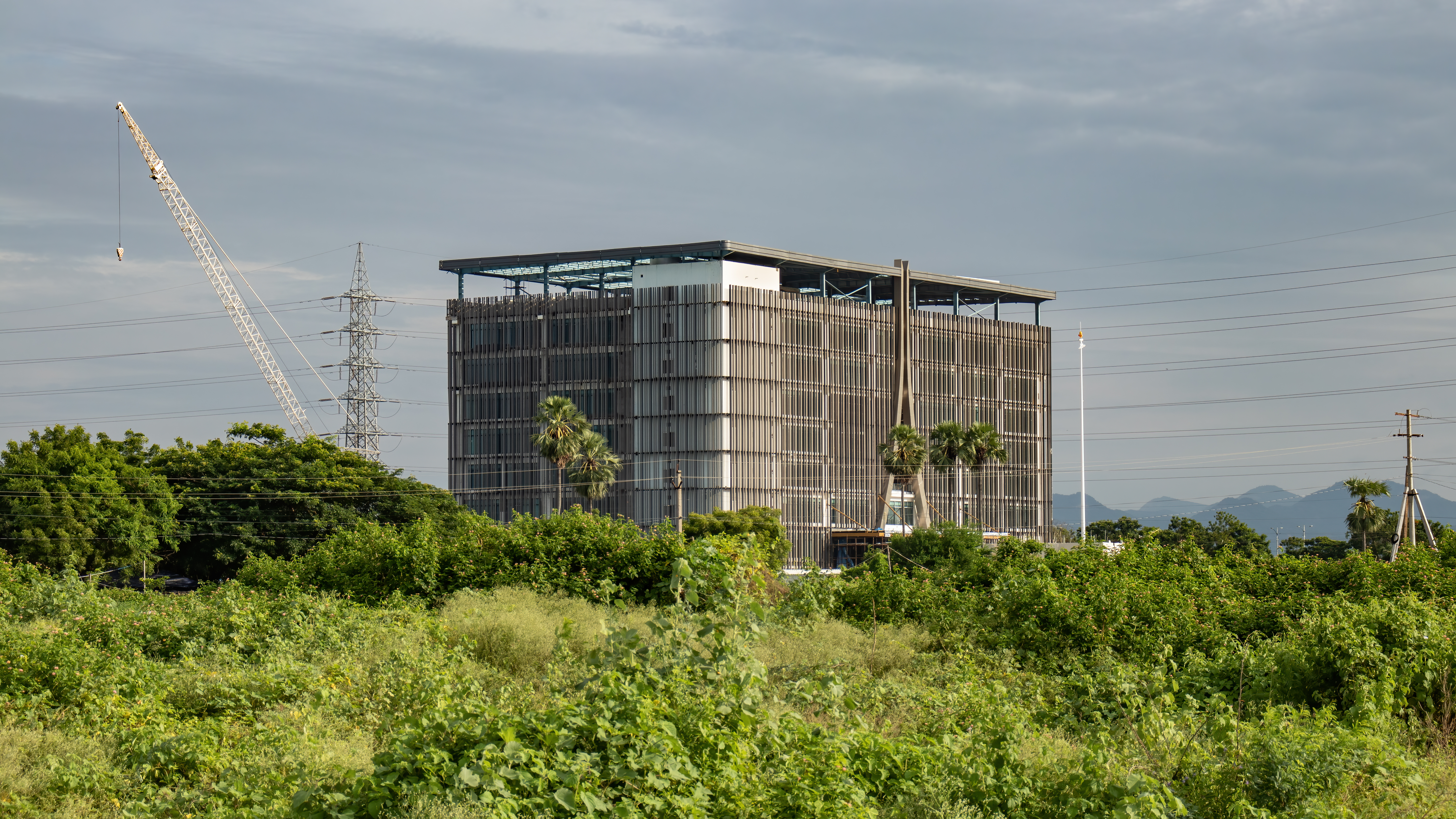
- APCRDA Headquarters in Amaravati

Agency overview
- Formed: 2014
- Preceding agencies: VGTMUDA; AMRDA
- Superseding agency: APCRDA
- Type: Urban Planning Agency
- Jurisdiction: Government of Andhra Pradesh
- Headquarters: Amaravati; 16°32′38.70″N 80°29′45.82″E
- Ministers responsible: N. Chandrababu Naidu, Chief Minister of Andhra Pradesh; Ponguru Narayana, Minister of Municipal Administration & Urban Development
- Agency executive: V. Vijay Rama Raju, I.A.S., Commissioner
- Website: https://crda.ap.gov.in/

The Andhra Pradesh Capital Region Development Authority (abbreviated APCRDA) is an urban planning agency of the Andhra Pradesh Capital Region, in the Indian state of Andhra Pradesh, India. The APCRDA was established under the Andhra Pradesh Capital Region Development Authority Act, 2014. The authority has a jurisdictional area of 8,352.69 km^{2} (3,224.99 sq mi), covering the districts of Guntur, Eluru, NTR, Krishna, Palnadu, and Bapatla.

The CRDA approved land pooling of an additional 20,494 acres from four villages in Amaravati mandal and three villages in Thullur mandal for the development of Amaravati.

== History ==
The APCRDA was formerly known as AMDA and the former was VGTM Urban Development Authority (VGTM UDA), which was formed in 1978 with an area of 1,954 km^{2} (754 sq mi). In 2012, it was expanded to 7,063 km^{2} (2,727 sq mi). Post bifurcation of Andhra Pradesh, it was defunct and was renamed as APCRDA. The head office of the authority is located in Amaravati. It has three sub-registrar offices at Thullur, Ananthavaram, and Mandadam. The authority has a jurisdictional area of 8,352.69 km^{2} (3,224.99 mi^{2}), covering the districts of Guntur and Krishna, including 217 km^{2} (84 sq mi) of the state capital, Amaravati.

=== AMRDA ===
In August 2020, the Andhra Pradesh legislative assembly passed the Andhra Pradesh decentralisation and inclusive development of all regions act. It provided for limiting Amaravati as legislative capital while naming Vizag as executive capital and Kurnool as judicial capital. Thus government's attempt to plan for three capital cities led to the dissolution of APCRDA and formation of Amaravati Metropolitan Region Development Area (AMRDA). The events leading to this decision resulted in widespread and continuing protests by the farmers of Amaravati. The act has been challenged in the Andhra Pradesh High Court, which ordered to maintain status quo until the court completes its hearing. The government, led by Y. S. Jagan Mohan Reddy, withdrew the act when the High Court hearing reached the final stage. The chief minister said that his government would bring a better and more complete bill. As the government withdrew the GO, the APCRDA was restored.

== Jurisdiction ==
Under the jurisdiction of APCRDA, Andhra Pradesh Capital Region comprises: Amaravathi, Vijayawada, Guntur cities and the districts of NTR, Krishna and Guntur. The below table list the urban areas of APCRDA:

Jurisdiction
Settlement Type	Name	Total
Municipal Corporations	Vijayawada, Guntur, Mangalagiri–Tadepalli	3
Municipalities	Tadigadapa, Kondapalli, Nuzvid, Gudivada, Tenali, Ponnur, Sattenapalle, Nandigama, Jaggayapeta	9
Nagar Panchayat	Vuyyuru	1

== See also ==
- Andhra Pradesh Capital Region
- Amaravati
- Vijayawada
- Guntur
- Amaravati Quantum Valley
