= Tenali Sravan Kumar =

Indian politician

Member of the Andhra Pradesh Legislative Assembly
- In office 2014–2019
- Preceded by: Dokka Manikya Vara Prasada Rao
- Succeeded by: Vundavalli Sridevi
- Constituency: Tadikonda

Member of the Andhra Pradesh Legislative Assembly
- Incumbent
- Assumed office 2024
- Preceded by: Vundavalli Sridevi
- Constituency: Tadikonda

Personal details
- Party: Telugu Desam Party
- Spouse: Madhavi Latha
- Children: Aproova and Anurag
- Parent(s): Johannes (father) and Annamma (mother)

Tenali Sravan Kumar is an Indian politician from Andhra Pradesh. He served as MLA from Tadikonda assembly constituency, Andhra Pradesh. He later became President of Guntur Parliamentary Constituency, TDP Andhra Pradesh. He lost by 4083 votes in the 2019 state legislative assembly elections to YSRCP candidate Vundavalli Sridevi.

== Early life ==
Tenali Sravan Kumar was born in Guntur District. His father was Tenali Johnnes.

== Political career ==
- 2014- 2019: Tadikonda Constituency MLA from TDP.
- 2019: Contested as an MLA from TDP and lost with 4083 votes.
