= Abbarajupalem, Thullur mandal =

Neighbourhood in Amaravati, Andhra Pradesh, India

Abbarajupalem
- Neighbourhood
- Location in Andhra Pradesh, India
- Coordinates: 16.552831°N 80.465471°E
- Country: India
- State: Andhra Pradesh
- District: Guntur
- Mandal: Thullur

Area
  - Total: 3.17 km^{2} (1.22 sq mi)

Population (2011)
  - Total: 490
  - Density: 150/km^{2} (400/sq mi)

Languages
  - Official: Telugu
- Time zone: UTC+5:30 (IST)
- PIN: 522 237
- Telephone code: +91–8645
- Vehicle registration: AP-07

Abbarajupalem is a neighbourhood in Amaravati, Andhra Pradesh, India. It is a part of Urban Notified Area of Amaravati. It was a village in Thullur mandal of in Guntur district, prior to its denotification as gram panchayat.

== Demographics ==
As of the 2011 Census of India, the village had a population of 490, of which males are 246, females are 244 with average sex ratio 992 and the population under 6 years of age are 45. The average literacy rate stands at 70.61 percent, with 346 literates.

== Transport ==
No bus services are available to this village one has to go to Rayapudi 1 km, which is located on the Vijayawada and Amaravathi routes. APSRTC run buses provide transport services from Vijayawada to Rayapudi.
