= Undavalli Sridevi =

Indian politician

Dr. Undavalli Sridevi

Member of Legislative Assembly
- In office 23 May 2019 – 26 February 2024
- Chief Minister: Y. S. Jagan Mohan Reddy
- Preceded by: Tenali Sravan Kumar
- Succeeded by: Tenali Sravan Kumar
- Constituency: Tadikonda

Personal details
- Party: Telugu Desam Party (since 2023)
- Other political affiliations: YSR Congress Party (2017-2023)
- Occupation: Doctor, Politician

Undavalli Sridevi (born 1968) is an Indian politician and a doctor by profession from the state of Andhra Pradesh. She is the incumbent Member of Legislative Assembly from Tadikonda Assembly constituency in Andhra Pradesh.

== Early life and education ==
Undavalli Sridevi was born in Tadikonda, Guntur district. She completed her MBBS from Bangalore in 1993. Her father Undavalli Subbarao contested as MLA from Tadikonda in 1978 from Reddy Congress.

== Career ==
In 2017, Sridevi joined the YSR Congress Party and contested the Tadikonda Assembly constituency in the 2019 Andhra Pradesh Legislative Assembly elections, winning with a margin of 4,433 votes against the Telugu Desam Party candidate and sitting MLA, Tenali Sravan Kumar.

In March 2023, she was suspended from the YSR Congress Party. This was because of allegations of cross-voting. Following the suspension, Sridevi said that "she was vilified for being a Dalit legislator". There was media speculation that she might join either the Telugu Desam Party or the Jana Sena Party.
