= Borupalem =

Neighbourhood in Amaravati, Andhra Pradesh, India

- Neighbourhood
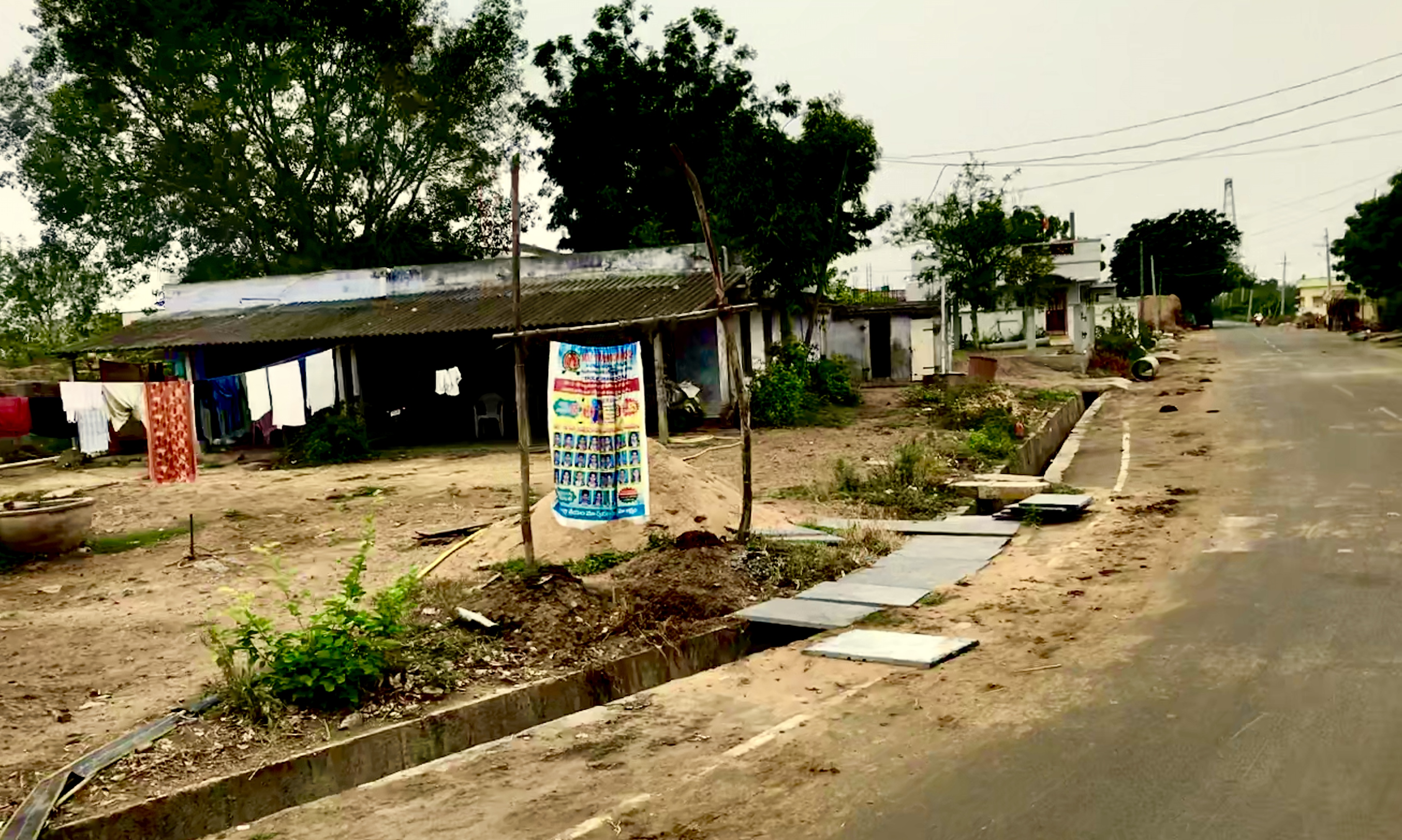
- Main road in Borupalem

- Location in Andhra Pradesh, India
- Coordinates: 16.562°N 80.457°E
- Country: India
- State: Andhra Pradesh
- District: Guntur

Area
  - Total: 2.69 km^{2} (1.04 sq mi)

Population (2011)
  - Total: 1,190
  - Density: 442/km^{2} (1,150/sq mi)

Languages
  - Official: Telugu
- Time zone: UTC+5:30 (IST)
- PIN: 522 237
- Telephone code: +91–8645
- Vehicle registration: AP-07

Borupalem is a neighbourhood in Amaravati, Andhra Pradesh, India. It is a part of Urban Notified Area of Amaravati. It was a village in Thullur mandal of in Guntur district, prior to its denotification as gram panchayat.

== Demographics ==
As of 2011 Census of India, the village had a population of 1,190, of which males are 576, females are 614 with average sex ratio 1066 and the population under 6 years of age are 115. The average literacy rate stands at 68% percent.

== Transport ==
Borupalem is located on the Vijayawada and Amaravathi routes. APSRTC run buses provide transport services from Vijayawada and Amaravathi to Borupalem.
