= Raajadhani Files =

2024 Indian Telugu political thriller film

- Theatrical release poster
- Directed by: Bhanu Shankar
- Screenplay by: Bhanu Shankar
- Dialogues by: Anil Acchugatla
- Story by: Bhanu Shankar
- Produced by: K. Ravi Shankar; Hima Bindu (presenter)
- Starring: Agilan Pushparaj; Vishal Patni; Vinod Kumar Alva; Vani Viswanath; Pawan
- Cinematography: Ramesh
- Edited by: Kotagiri Venkateswara Rao
- Music by: Mani Sharma
- Production company: TeluguOne Productions
- Release date: 15 February 2024
- Country: India
- Language: Telugu

Raajadhani Files is a 2024 Indian Telugu-language political thriller film written and directed by Bhanu Shankar and Produced by Ravi Shankar Kantamanenie. The film stars Agilan Pushparaj (in his Telugu debut), Vishal Patni, Vinod Kumar Alva, Vani Viswanath, and Pawan. It was released amid protests on 15 February 2024 to mixed reviews.

== Premise ==
The film is set against the backdrop of 2019–2024 Amaravati protests by farmers against the Andhra Pradesh Government in 29 villages of Guntur and Krishna districts.

== Cast ==
- Agilan Pushparaj as Gowtham
- Vishal Patni
- Vinod Kumar Alva as Farmer
- Vani Viswanath as Farmer
- Pawan as Chief Minister of Andhra Pradesh
- Veena Panchaparvala as Aishwarya
- Ajay Rathnam
- Amrutha Chowdary
- Shanmukh
- Madhu
- Ankita Thakur (special appearance) in "Touch Chesey" song

== Music ==
Music by Mani Sharma. Lyrics by Suddala Ashok Teja and Venigalla Rambabu.

- "Yeruvaka Saagaaroo"
- "Chenu Talli"
- "Idi Chedirina Swapnam"
- "Prabhatamaa"
- "Gudivada Casino"
- "Padayatra"

== Reception ==
Shekhar Kusuma of The Times of India Samayam rated the film two out of five stars and wrote that Raajadhani Files may not reach all sections of the audience but it will stir up passion among the residents of the capital region. Aithagoni Raju of Asianet News gave the film the same rating and wrote that the point chosen by the director is okay and the point he wanted to say is okay, but he could not impress in shaping it into a movie. A critic from Eenadu praised the film's historical background, emotions, dialogues and actors and concluded that its story about the struggle of farmers in the capital are inspiring. Times Now gave the film 2/5 stars and wrote, "Rajadhani Files falls short of expectations as a political drama, lacking the depth and emotional resonance necessary to fully engage audiences."
