= Tadikonda Assembly constituency =

Constituency of the Andhra Pradesh Legislative Assembly, India

Coordinates: 16.42°N 80.45°E

Tadikonda
- Constituency No. 86 for the Andhra Pradesh Legislative Assembly
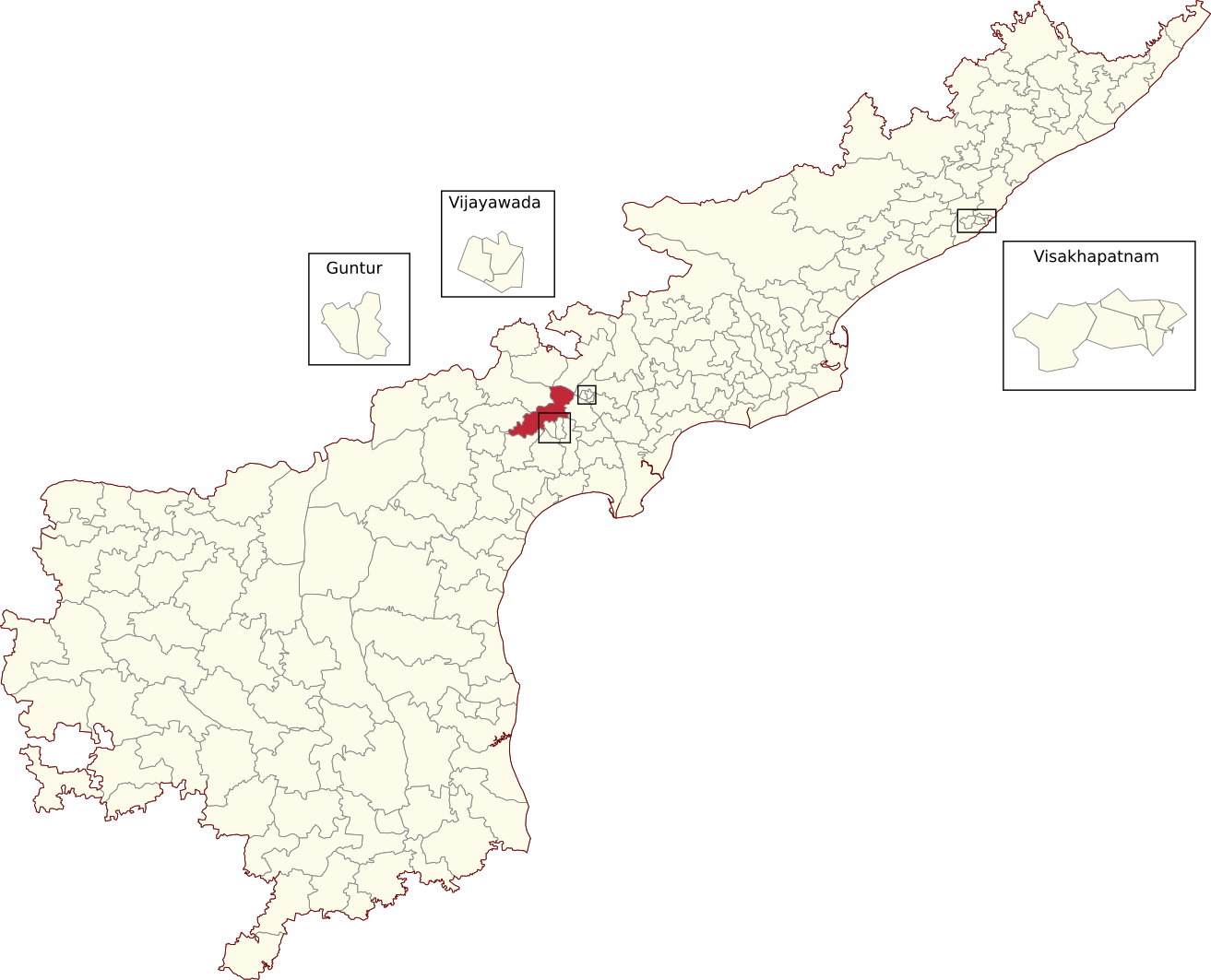
- Location of Tadikonda Assembly constituency within Andhra Pradesh

Constituency details
- Country: India
- Region: South India
- State: Andhra Pradesh
- District: Guntur
- Lok Sabha constituency: Guntur
- Established: 1967
- Total electors: 200,065
- Reservation: SC

Member of Legislative Assembly
- 16th Andhra Pradesh Legislative Assembly
- Incumbent Tenali Sravan Kumar
- Party: TDP
- Alliance: NDA
- Elected year: 2024

Tadikonda is a Scheduled Caste reserved constituency in Guntur district of Andhra Pradesh that elects representatives to the Andhra Pradesh Legislative Assembly in India. It is one of the seven assembly segments of Guntur Lok Sabha constituency.

Tenali Sravan Kumar is the current MLA of the constituency, having won the 2024 Andhra Pradesh Legislative Assembly election from Telugu Desam Party. As of 2019, there are a total of 200,065 electors in the constituency. The constituency was established in 1967, as per the Delimitation Orders (1967).

== Mandals ==
Mandal
Tullur
Tadikonda
Phirangipuram
Medikonduru

== Members of the Legislative Assembly ==
Year	Member	Political party
1967	Gadde Venkata Rattaiah	Indian National Congress
1972	Gadde Venkata Rattaiah	Indian National Congress
1978	Tamanpalli Amrutha Rao	Indian National Congress (I)
1983	J. R. Pushparaj	Telugu Desam Party
1985	J. R. Pushparaj	Telugu Desam Party
1989	Tiruvaipati Venkaiah	Indian National Congress
1994	G. M. N. V. Prasad	Communist Party of India
1999	J. R. Pushparaju	Telugu Desam Party
2004	Dokka Manikya Vara Prasada Rao	Indian National Congress
2009	Dokka Manikya Vara Prasada Rao	Indian National Congress
2014	Tenali Sravan Kumar	Telugu Desam Party
2019	Undavalli Sridevi	YSR Congress Party
2024	Tenali Sravan Kumar	Telugu Desam Party

== Election results ==
=== 2024 ===
2024 Andhra Pradesh Legislative Assembly election: Tadikonda
Party	Candidate	Votes	%	±%
TDP	Tenali Sravan Kumar	109,585	59.52	
YSRCP	Mekathoti Sucharitha	69,979	38.01	
INC	Manichala Sushil Raja	2,514	1.37	
NOTA	None Of The Above	995	0.54	
Majority		39,606	21.51	
Turnout		1,84,100		
TDP gain from YSRCP		Swing		

=== 2019 ===
2019 Andhra Pradesh Legislative Assembly election: Tadikonda
Party	Candidate	Votes	%	±%
YSRCP	Vundavalli Sridevi	86,848	48.66	
TDP	Tenali Sravan Kumar	82,415	46.18	
Majority		4083	2.48	
Turnout				
YSRCP gain from TDP		Swing		

=== 2014 ===
2014 Andhra Pradesh Legislative Assembly election: Tadikonda
Party	Candidate	Votes	%	±%
TDP	Tenali Sravan Kumar	80,847	50.70	
YSRCP	Kathera Heni Christina	73,305	45.97	
Majority		7,542	4.73	
Turnout		159,473	89.15	+4.85
TDP gain from INC		Swing		

=== 2009 ===
2009 Andhra Pradesh Legislative Assembly election: Tadikonda
Party	Candidate	Votes	%	±%
INC	Dokka Manikya Vara Prasada Rao	61,406	44.07	−12.17
TDP	Tenali Sravan Kumar	57,786	41.47	−0.58
PRP	Ravela Santhi Jyothi	16,001	11.48	
Majority		3,620	2.60	
Turnout		139,329	84.30	+6.33
INC hold		Swing		

=== 2004 ===
2004 Andhra Pradesh Legislative Assembly election: Tadikonda
Party	Candidate	Votes	%	±%
INC	Dokka Manikya Vara Prasada Rao	63,411	56.24	+11.79
TDP	J. R. Pushparaj	47,405	42.05	−7.32
Majority		16,006	14.19	
Turnout		112,743	75.97	+11.91
INC gain from TDP		Swing		

=== 1999 ===
1999 Andhra Pradesh Legislative Assembly election: Tadikonda
Party	Candidate	Votes	%	±%
TDP	J. R. Pushparaj	51,568	49.37	
INC	Kuchipudi Sambasiva Rao	46,423	44.45	
Margin of victory		5,145	4.93	
Turnout		106,524	65.33	
Registered electors		163,048		
TDP gain from CPI		Swing		

=== 1994 ===
1994 Andhra Pradesh Legislative Assembly election: Tadikonda
Party	Candidate	Votes	%	±%
CPI	G.M.N.V.Prasad	53,069	53.06	
INC	Venkaiah Tiruvaipati	38,068	38.06	
Margin of victory		15,001	15.00	
Turnout		101,732	67.45	
Registered electors		150,823		
CPI gain from INC		Swing		

=== 1989 ===
1989 Andhra Pradesh Legislative Assembly election: Tadikonda
Party	Candidate	Votes	%	±%
INC	Venkaiah Tiruvaipati	49,799	50.42	
TDP	J. R. Pushpa Raju	47,561	48.17	
Margin of victory		2,218	2.25	
Turnout		101,422	69.17	
Registered electors		146,627		
INC hold		Swing		

=== 1985 ===
1985 Andhra Pradesh Legislative Assembly election: Tadikonda
Party	Candidate	Votes	%	±%
TDP	J. R. Pushparaj	40,589	50.79	
INC	Kuchipudi Sambasiva Rao	37,935	47.47	
Margin of victory		2,654	3.32	
Turnout		80,928	67.62	
Registered electors		119,679		
TDP hold		Swing		

=== 1983 ===
1983 Andhra Pradesh Legislative Assembly election: Tadikonda
Party	Candidate	Votes	%	±%
TDP	J. R. Pushparaj	42,987	60.61	
INC	Amrutha Rao Tamanpalli	16,501	23.27	
Margin of victory		26,486	37.34	
Turnout		72,127	63.86	
Registered electors		112,937		
TDP gain from INC(I)		Swing		

=== 1978 ===
1978 Andhra Pradesh Legislative Assembly election: Tadikonda
Party	Candidate	Votes	%	±%
INC(I)	Amrutha Rao Tamanpalli	34,042	46.84	
JP	Jonnakuti Krishna Rao	27,565	37.93	
Margin of victory		6,477	8.91	
Turnout		74,236	69.09	
Registered electors		107,449		
INC(I) gain from INC		Swing		

=== 1972 ===
1972 Andhra Pradesh Legislative Assembly election: Tadikonda
Party	Candidate	Votes	%	±%
INC	Gadde Venkata Rattaiah	28,206	47.85	
Independent	Subbaiah Bandlamudi	24,711	41.92	
Margin of victory		3,495	5.93	
Turnout		60,024	68.28	
Registered electors		87,913		
INC hold		Swing		

=== 1967 ===
1967 Andhra Pradesh Legislative Assembly election: Tadikonda
Party	Candidate	Votes	%	±%
INC	Gadde Venkata Rattaiah	23,449	47.72	
CPI(M)	K Sivaramakrishnaiah	16,419	33.41	
Margin of victory		7,030	14.31	
Turnout		51,049	69.96	
Registered electors		72,967		
INC win (new seat)				

== See also ==
- List of constituencies of the Andhra Pradesh Legislative Assembly
