= Velagapudi =

Neighbourhood in Amaravati, Andhra Pradesh, India

- Neighbourhood
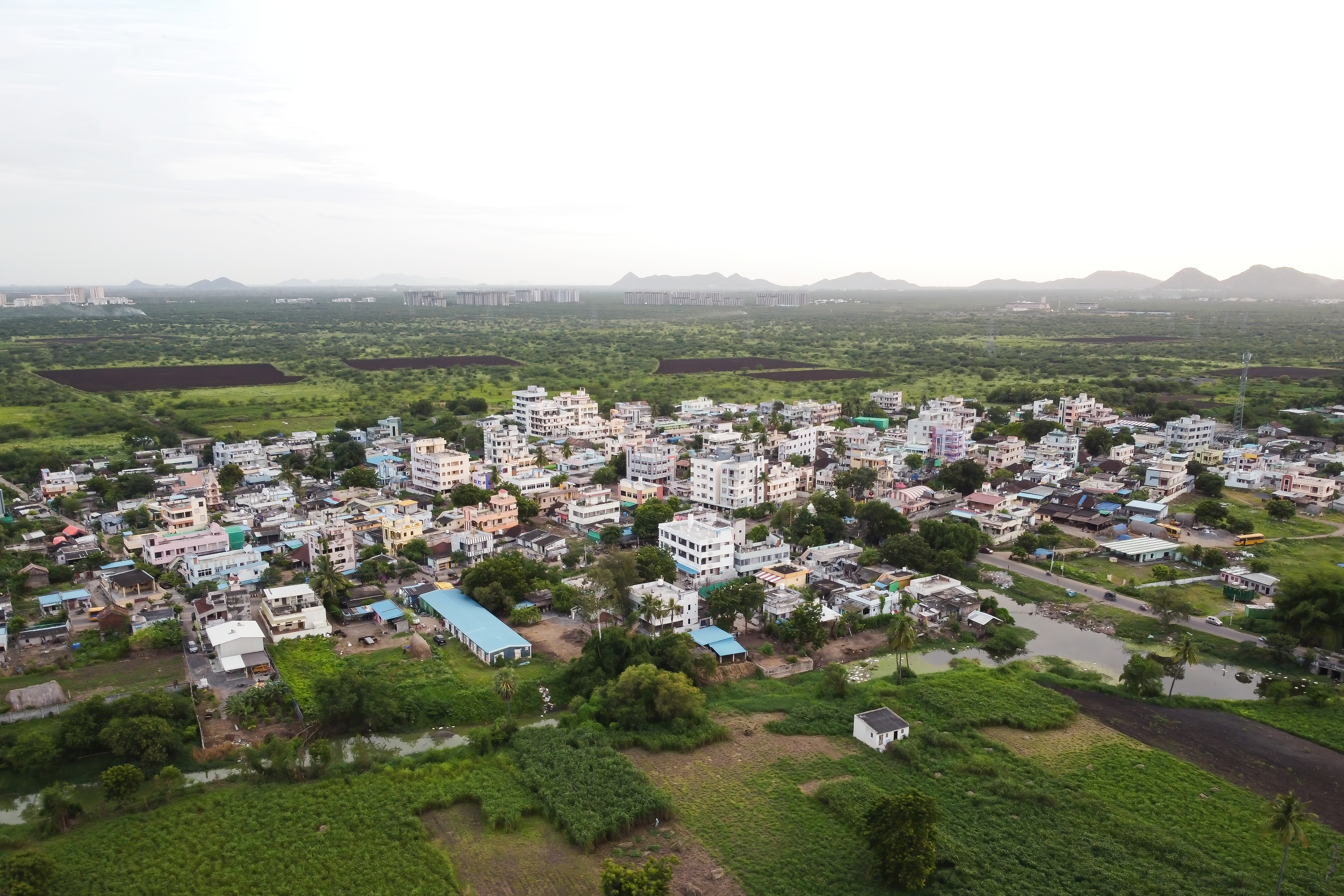
- Aerial view of Velagapudi
- Interactive map of Velagapudi
- Location in Andhra Pradesh, India
- Coordinates: 16°31′34″N 80°30′45″E
- Country: India
- State: Andhra Pradesh
- District: Guntur
- Mandal: Thullur

Government
  - Body: Andhra Pradesh Capital Region Development Authority

Area
  - Total: 8.09 km^{2} (3.12 sq mi)

Population (2011)
  - Total: 2,688
  - Density: 332/km^{2} (861/sq mi)

Languages
  - Official: Telugu
- Time zone: UTC+5:30 (IST)
- PIN: 522 237
- Telephone code: +91–8645
- Vehicle registration: AP-07, AP08, AP39, AP40

Velagapudi is a neighbourhood in Amaravati, Andhra Pradesh, India. It is a part of Urban Notified Area of Amaravati. It was a village in Thullur Mandal of Guntur district before its denotification as Gram Panchayat. Velagapudi is also the home to the interim Secretariat of Andhra Pradesh.

== History ==
King Ganapati Deva of Kakatiya Dynasty, who ruled between 1199 AD and 1261 AD, had gifted the two villages of Velagapudi and Mandadam to Sivacharya, spiritual preceptor of Golaki Matham at Mandadam.

== Demographics ==
As of 2011 Census of India, the town had a population of 2,688. Of the total population, males constitute 1,346 and females are 1,342, with a sex ratio of 997 females per 1000 males. The population under 6 years of age is 260. The literacy rate stands at 62.81 percent, with 1,525 literates.

== Transport ==
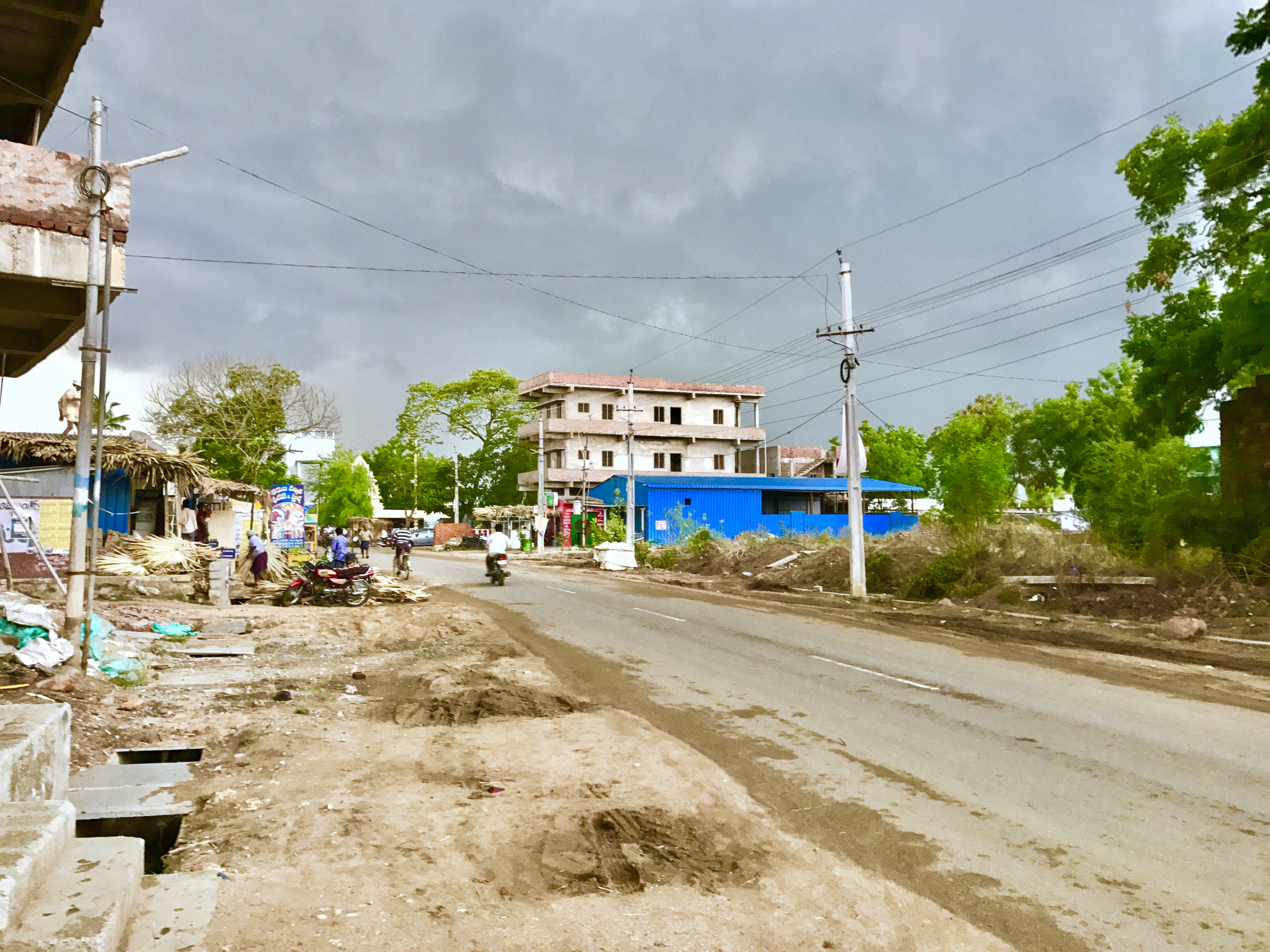
Velagapudi main road

Velagapudi is located on the Vijayawada and Amaravathi route. APSRTC runs buses that provide transport services from Vijayawada and Guntur to Velagapudi.
