= Nelapadu, Amaravati =

Neighbourhood in Amaravati, Andhra Pradesh, India

Nelapadu
- Neighbourhood
- Location in Andhra Pradesh, India
- Coordinates: 16°30′37″N 80°28′50″E
- Country: India
- State: Andhra Pradesh
- District: Guntur
- Mandal: Thullur

Area
  - Total: 5.74 km^{2} (2.22 sq mi)

Population (2011)
  - Total: 1,028
  - Density: 179/km^{2} (464/sq mi)

Languages
  - Official: Telugu
- Time zone: UTC+5:30 (IST)
- PIN: 522 237
- Telephone code: +91–8645
- Vehicle registration: AP-07

Nelapadu is a neighbourhood in Amaravati, Andhra Pradesh, India. It is a part of Urban Notified Area of Amaravati. It was a village in Thullur mandal of in Guntur district, prior to its denotification as gram panchayat.

== Demographics ==
As of 2011 Census of India, the village had a population of 1,028, of which males are 494, females are 534 with sex ratio 1081. The population under 6 years of age are 74. The average literacy rate stands at 59.63 percent, with 613 literates.

== Transport ==
Nelapadu is located on the Thullur and Guntur route. APSRTC run buses provide transport services from Guntur to Nelapadu.
