= Ananthavaram, Thullur mandal =

Neighbourhood in Amaravati, Andhra Pradesh, India

Ananthavaram
- Neighbourhood
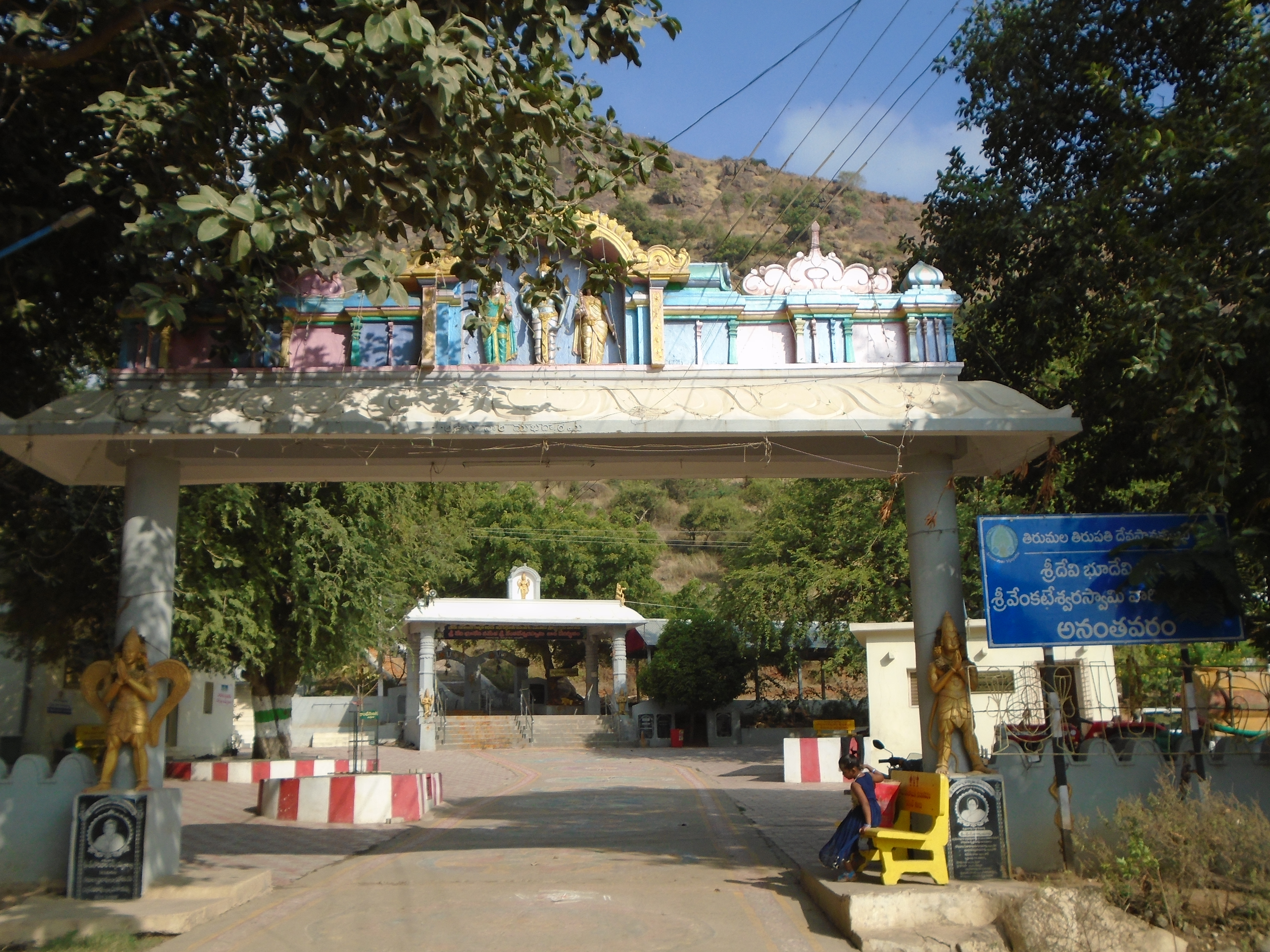
- Venkateswara Temple, Ananthavaram, Tulluru Mandalam, Amaravathi, A.P

- Location in Andhra Pradesh, India
- Coordinates: 16.5275°N 80.4681°E
- Country: India
- State: Andhra Pradesh
- Region: Coastal Andhra
- District: Guntur

Area
  - Total: 10.30 km^{2} (3.98 sq mi)
- Elevation: 25 m (82 ft)

Population (2011)
  - Total: 3,391
  - Density: 329.2/km^{2} (852.7/sq mi)

Languages
  - Official: Telugu
- Time zone: UTC+5:30 (IST)
- PIN: 522236
- Telephone code: +91–8645
- Vehicle registration: AP–07

Anantavaram is a neighbourhood in Amaravati, Andhra Pradesh, India. It is a part of Urban Notified Area of Amaravati. It was a village in Thullur mandal of Guntur district, prior to its denotification as gram panchayat.

== Geography ==
The village is located at 16.5275°N 80.4681°E.

== Religious worships ==
Ananthavaram has a historical temple Anathavaram Venkateswara Swamy Temple dedicated to Lord Venkateswara, situated on the hill top. It is being administered by Tirumala Tirupati Devasthanams trust.

== Transport ==
Ananthavaram lies on Guntur-Thulluru road. APS RTC operates bus services from GunturMangalagiri, Thulluru and Amaravathi to this region.
