= Pedaparimi =

- Village
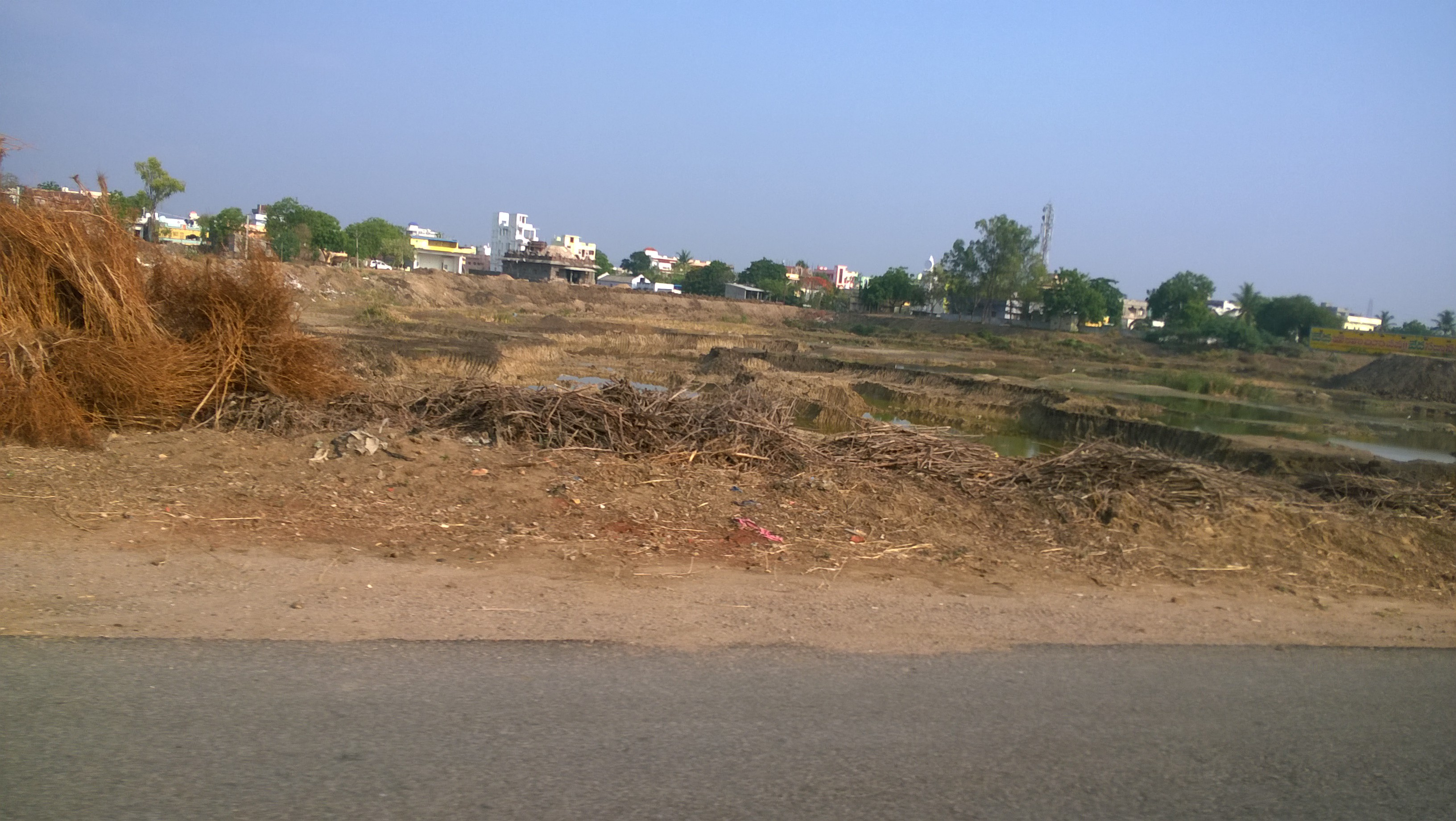
- A view of village from Guntur road
- Interactive map of Pedaparimi
- Location in Andhra Pradesh, India Pedaparimi (India)
- Coordinates: 16.27497°N 80.27182°E
- Country: India
- State: Andhra Pradesh
- District: Guntur
- Mandal: Thullur

Area
  - Total: 26.36 km^{2} (10.18 sq mi)

Population (2011)
  - Total: 6,887
  - Density: 261.3/km^{2} (676.7/sq mi)

Languages
  - Official: Telugu
- Time zone: UTC+05:30 (IST)
- Postal code: 522 236
- Vehicle registration: AP-07

Pedaparimi is a village in Guntur district of the Indian state of Andhra Pradesh. It is located in Thullur mandal of Guntur revenue division. It lies adjacent to state capital Amaravati.

== Demographics ==
As of 2011 Census of India, Pedaparmi had a population of 6,887. The total population constitutes 3,388 males and 3,499 females with a sex ratio of 1033 females per 1000 males. 646 children are in the age group of 0–6 years, a ratio of 1019 girls per 1000 boys. The average literacy rate stands at 66.16% with 4,129 literates, slightly lower than the state average of 67.41%.

== See also ==
- Villages in Thullur mandal
