= Vaddamanu =

Vaddamanu vardhamanapuram
- Village
- Interactive map of Vaddamanu
- Location in Andhra Pradesh, India
- Coordinates: 16°31′52″N 80°25′18″E
- Country: India
- State: Andhra Pradesh
- District: Guntur
- Elevation: 23 m (75 ft)

Population (2011)
  - Total: 2,716

Languages
  - Official: Telugu
- Time zone: UTC+5:30 (IST)
- PIN: 522 237
- Telephone code: 08645
- Vehicle registration: AP-07

Vaddamanu is a village in Guntur district of the Indian state of Andhra Pradesh. It is located at a distance of 7 km from Krishna River in Thullur mandal of Guntur revenue division. The village is a part of the new capital, Amaravati.

== Demographics ==
As of 2011 Census of India, the town had a population of 2,716, of which males are 1,347, females are 1,369 and the population under 6 years of age are 258. The average literacy rate stands at 59.89 percent, with 1,613 literates.

== Excavation ==
In excavation pillars, railing, cross-bars, coping, umbrellas and other architectural remnants of Vihara and Stupa, suggesting a grand stupa in the area. Jain stupa similar to Kankali Tila were excavated in the area. The representation in art motif of stupa suggests the stupa was dedicated to Jainism. The inscriptions indicate Vaddamanu as Jain center in 3rd century BCE to 6th century CE. There are two ellipsoidal structure similar to Udayagiri and Khandagiri Caves. These structures were used as place of worship.

Coins were found containing information about kings of Sada dynasty including Maha Sada, Sivamaka Sada and Asaka Sada.

== See also ==
- Thullur mandal
