= Telugu Nadu Students Federation =

Student Organisation

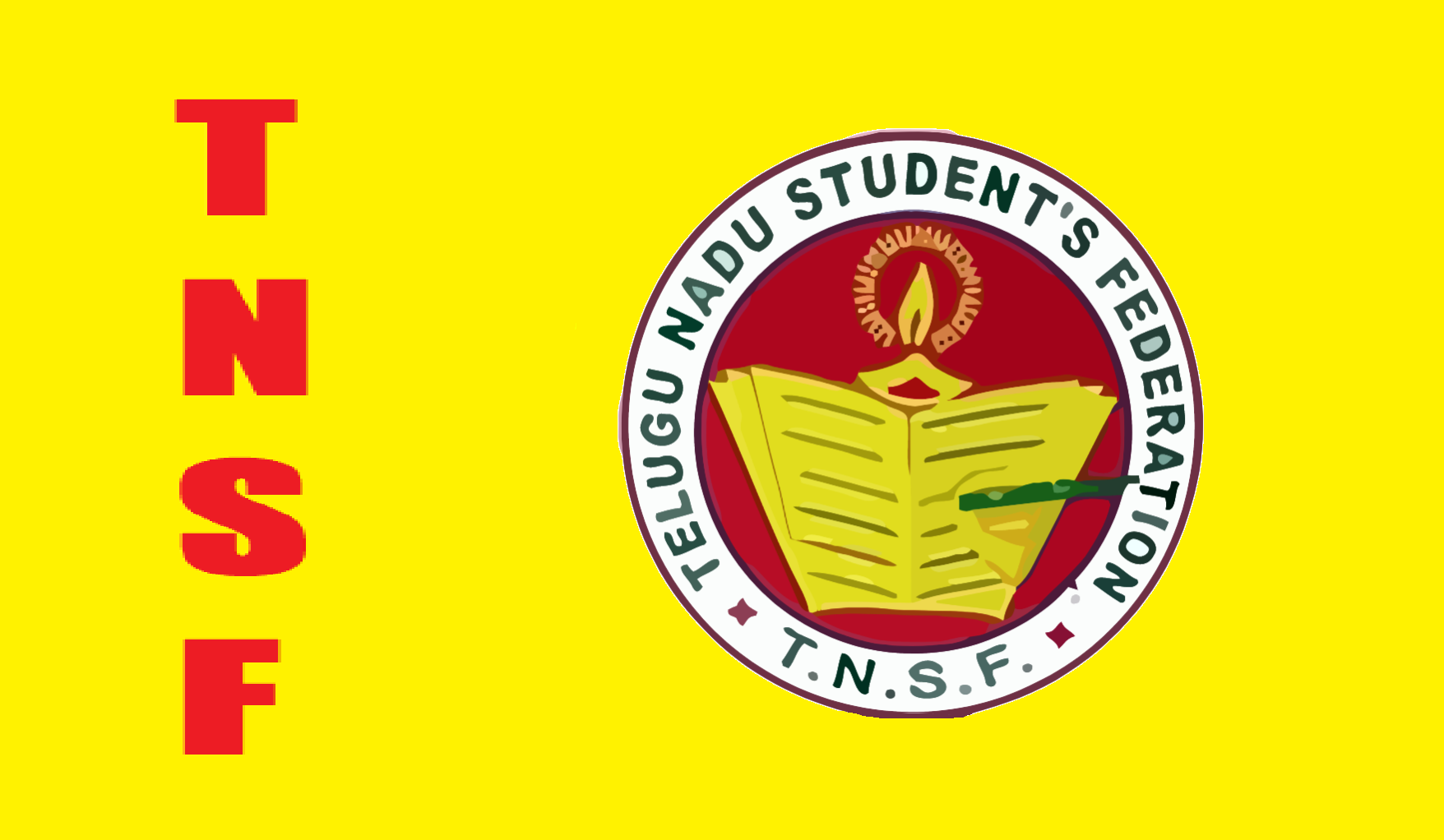
- Abbreviation: TNSF
- Type: Student Organisation
- Region served: Andhra Pradesh, Telangana
- Official language: Telugu
- State President Ap & Ts: Pranav Gopal Manam Andhrapradesh; Parlapalli Ravindar Telangana

Telugu Nadu Students Federation (TNSF) is a Students' Wing of the Telugu Desam Party. It is being Organised by National Party convenor Nara Lokesh.

== See also ==
- World Organisation of Students and Youth
