= J. R. Pushparaj =

Indian politician

Juvvigunta Rathna Pushparaj (1960 – 28 July 2022) is an Indian politician from Andhra Pradesh. He was a former two-time minister and a three time MLA from Tadikond Assembly constituency in Guntur district representing the Telugu Desam Party.

== Career ==
Pushparaj entered active politics as a student leader in the late 1970s at Acharya Nagarjuna University where he served as the president of the students union in 1978. He was later invited by NT Rama Rao and joined the Telugu Desam Party in its early days in 1982. He first became an MLA from the Tadikonda Assembly constituency winning the 1983 Andhra Pradesh Legislative Assembly election representing the Telugu Desam Party. He polled 42,987 votes and defeated his nearest rival, Tamanapalli Amrutha Rao of the Indian National Congress (Indira), by 26,486 votes. He retained the seat for the TDP in 1989 Andhra Pradesh Legislative Assembly election where he polled 40,589 votes and beat his closest opponent, Kuchipudi Sambasivarao of the Indian National Congress by 2,654 votes. He later won again after two terms, in the 1999 Andhra Pradesh Legislative Assembly election where he garnered 51,568 and defeated Congress candidate Sambasivarao again by 5,145 votes.

=== Death ===
Pushparaj died on 28 July 2022 at a private hospital in Guntur suffering a heart attack.
