= Rayapudi =

Neighbourhood in Amaravati, Andhra Pradesh, India

- Neighbourhood
- Location in Andhra Pradesh, India
- Coordinates: 16°33′0″N 80°28′45″E
- Country: India
- State: Andhra Pradesh
- District: Guntur

Area
  - Total: 24.34 km^{2} (9.40 sq mi)

Population (2011)
  - Total: 4,817
  - Density: 197.9/km^{2} (512.6/sq mi)

Languages
  - Official: Telugu
- Time zone: UTC+5:30 (IST)
- PIN: 522237
- Vehicle registration: AP-07

Rayapudi is a neighbourhood in Amaravati, Andhra Pradesh, India. It is a part of Urban Notified Area of Amaravati. It was a village in Thullur mandal of in Guntur district, prior to its denotification as gram panchayat.

== Transport ==
Rayapudi is located on the Vijayawada-Amaravati road. APSRTC operates buses on this route from Pandit Nehru bus station of Vijayawada.
