= Pulipadu =

- Village
- Interactive map of Pulipadu
- Location in Andhra Pradesh, India
- Coordinates: 16.58°N 79.57°E
- Country: India
- State: Andhra Pradesh
- District: Palnadu
- Mandal: Gurajala

Government
  - Type: Panchayati raj
  - Body: Pulipadu gram panchayat

Area
  - Total: 2,282 ha (5,640 acres)

Population (2011)
  - Total: 6,788
  - Density: 297.5/km^{2} (770.4/sq mi)

Languages
  - Official: Telugu
- Time zone: UTC+5:30 (IST)
- PIN: 522xxx
- Area code: +91–
- Vehicle registration: AP

Pulipadu is a village in Palnadu district of the Indian state of Andhra Pradesh. It is located in Gurazala mandal of Gurazala revenue division.

== Geography ==
Pulipadu is situated to the northeast of the mandal headquarters, Gurazala, at 16.58°N 79.57°E. It is spread over an area of 2,282 ha (5,640 acres).

== Governance ==
Pulipadu gram panchayat is the local self-government of the village.

== Education ==
As per the school information report for the academic year 2018–19, the village has 4 Zilla/Mandal Parishad schools.
