= Andhra Pradesh Decentralisation and Inclusive Development of All Regions Act, 2020 =

Andhra Pradesh Legislature
- Long title: A Bill to provide for decentralisation of governance and inclusive development of all the regions of the state of andhra pradesh and for providing for establishments of zonal planning and development boards apart from the provisions of the seats of governance in different regions of the state and for matters ancillary thereto.
- Citation: Act No. 28 of 2020
- Considered by: Andhra Pradesh Legislature
- Passed by: Andhra Pradesh Legislative Assembly
- Passed: 20 January 2020
- Passed by: Andhra Pradesh Legislative Council
- Passed: (Note: The bill was first passed by the Legislative Assembly on 20 January 2020, but it was not passed by the Legislative Council. The Assembly passed the bill again on 16 June 2020, after which it was sent to the Governor for assent, in accordance with Article 197 of the Constitution of India, without the approval of the Council.)
- Assented to: 31 July 2020
- Signed by: Biswabhusan Harichandan
- Signed: 31 July 2020
- Effective: 31 July 2020
- Repealed: 13 December 2021

Legislative history

Initiating chamber: Andhra Pradesh Legislative Assembly
- Introduced by: Buggana Rajendranath; Minister for Finance, Planning and Legislative Affairs
- Introduced: 20 January 2020; 6 years ago
- First reading: 20 January 2020
- Second reading: 21 January 2020

Amends
- Andhra Pradesh Reorganisation Act, 2014
- Status: Repealed

The Andhra Pradesh Decentralisation and Inclusive Development of All Regions Act, 2020 is an act of Andhra Pradesh Legislature aimed at the decentralisation of governance in the Indian state of Andhra Pradesh. The bill was proposed by the Government of Andhra Pradesh to establish three capitals at different places in the state namely Visakhapatnam, Amaravati, and Kurnool, which will serve as executive, legislative and judicial capitals respectively.

The Act was mainly proposed to balance the Governance in all the parts of the state taking into consideration the aspirations of the people of all the regions of the state. The act was mostly derived from the principles of Siva Rama Krishnan Committee appointed by the Indian Government; G.N. Rao committee and Boston Consulting Group (BCG) committee appointed by the Andhra Pradesh Government.

The bill received the Governor's assent on 31 July 2020. Government of Andhra Pradesh issued gazette notification on the same day, thus becoming an Act.

== Background ==
=== Andhra State ===
On 15 August 1947, India became independent country from British rule. Ramaswamy Reddiyar was the first Chief Minister of Madras state consisting Tamil Nadu and Rayalaseema, Coastal Andhra regions. Madras State was succeeded from Madras Presidency on 26 January 1950. However, the Telugu-speaking people were unhappy with the decision, as Tamil-speaking people dominated the entire statehood. Thus they called for Andhra movement and demanded for new state. Potti Sri Ramulu one of the strong activists, took indefinite hunger strike from 19 October 1952, and demanded for a separate Andhra state from the Madras state for the Telugu speaking people. On 15 December 1952, Sri ramulu died in the fasting camp after commencing his fasting about 58 days. As the news of his death broke, massive violence and protests spread all over the southern states of India. As a result of his sacrifice, the Prime Minister Jawaharlal Nehru bifurcated Madras state to the new Andhra state consisting eleven districts of Coastal Andhra and Rayalaseema on 1 October 1953, with Kurnool as its temporary capital of Andhra state and the Madras city as permanent capital of Madras state. The High court of the Andhra state was established in Guntur on basis of Sribagh Pact.

==== Sri Bagh Pact of 1937 ====
The Rayalaseema people raised concerns about several issues based on education, development and discrimination. Several controversies had made inequality difficulties and regional imbalance fears among people of rayalaseema. In November 1937, several leaders of Rayalaseema and Coastal Andhra had discussed on several issues and made an agreement pact.

On discussing issues regarding to capital, and legislature the following terms was agreed:

The location of the University, the Headquarters and the High Court shall be in different regions. While the University may continue to be where it is, the High Court and Metropolis are to be located in suitable places in the Coastal districts and Rayalaseema and the choice shall be given to Rayalaseema.

=== States Reorganisation Act, 1956 ===
In 1956, the Parliament of India introduced an act which was a major reform of the boundaries of Indian states and territories, organising them along linguistic lines. Following the effects of changes made to Constitution of India, the newly Combined Andhra Pradesh was formed by the merger of Hyderabad state along with Andhra state for Telugu speaking people's demand.

=== United Andhra Pradesh State ===
However, Telugu-speaking people demanded for their long-cherished Visalandhra statehood formation. The States Reorganisation Commission headed by Syed Fazal Ali heard the views of different people and organizations of both states. Based on the commission's conclusions, the Government of India preferred Visalandhra and enlarged the state by including nine Telugu speaking districts of Hyderabad state to eleven districts of Andhra state to form Andhra Pradesh with 20 districts. The Andhra Pradesh state was formed by the merger of Hyderabad state and Andhra state with its new capital Hyderabad on basis of Gentlemen's Agreement of 1956. The Telangana leaders proposed that the High court of the Andhra Pradesh state should be located in Hyderabad and a bench should be constituted in Guntur. But the Andhra leaders rejected it by stating that high court can be established in hyderabad and there was no need for a bench in Guntur district.

=== New Andhra Pradesh State ===
During 1969 to 1973, several movements like Telangana movement and 1972 Jai Andhra movement took place for bifurcation of the state. Protests started with the hunger strike of a student from Khammam district for the implementation of safe-guards promised during the creation of Andhra Pradesh. The movement slowly manifested into a demand for a separate statehood. Amid, the people of Telangana had alleged violations of Gentlemen's Agreement of 1956 led to the 1969 Telangana movement and cited as one of the main reasons for the demands of separate statehood for Telangana region. On 2 June 2014 United Andhra Pradesh has bifurcated into Telangana consists of 10 districts, and residuary Andhra Pradesh consists of 13 districts with Hyderabad as permanent capital for Telangana state.

=== AP Reorganisation Act, 2014 ===
The Parliament of India implemented an act that defined the boundaries of the two states, and laid out the status of Hyderabad as the permanent capital of Telangana state and temporary capital of the Andhra Pradesh state for 10 years. It had also mentioned that a new capital for the state of Andhra Pradesh will be chosen by the committee it appointed known as "Siva Rama Krishnan Committee" headed by a renowned retired IAS Officer, K.C. Siva Rama Krishnan.

== Capital and Criticism ==
Siva Rama Krishnan Committee

The committee headed by K. C. Siva Rama Krishnan and its experts members toured all of the state and had submitted their report. The report suggested to go for a decentralised development i.e., by transferring the powers of the Government to several parts of the state, using the resources of the state to the fullest and heavily warned not to go for a "honeypot" model of establishing each and every resource in and around a single town or a city. It had even objected the model of Hyderabad which the state had earlier implemented by establishing every government power in and around Hyderabad. The committee strongly objected choosing any capital between Vijayawada and Guntur (as the members of Telugu Desam Party started to say they might establish a capital around Vijayawada and Guntur even prior to the committee report was submitted) feeling that might disturb the agricultural delta lands of Krishna River. The committee instead suggested for going on an all-round based development without disturbing the environmental concerns. It had also mentioned to use less land area for the capital usage and clearly mentioned the area needed for the capital functions in its report. The committee submitted the report on 27 August 2014.

Amaravati chosen as the capital

However the then Government of Andhra Pradesh led by Chandrababu Naidu as the Chief Minister was not satisfied with the report of Siva Rama Krishnan Committee. Instead a new committee was appointed under the then Municipal Minister of the Government, P. Narayana and eventually chose Amaravati of Guntur district as the capital against to the suggestions made by the Indian government appointed Siva Rama Krishnan Committee. The then government led by Chandrababu Naidu as the Chief Minister had gone ahead for constructing a Mega Greenfield city without even considering the suggestions made by the Siva Rama Krishnan committee to divide the governance powers. An area of around 33000 acres was brought under Land pooling scheme for the capital just what the Siva Rama Krishnan committee warned not to do.

Criticism in choosing Amaravati as a "Honey-pot" capital

Heavy criticism was met for not considering the suggestions made by the Indian government appointed Siva Rama Krishnan Committee to transfer the powers of the government to various parts of the state. However the then government led by Chief Minister Chandrababu Naidu had gone ahead with capital being proposed at Amaravati for which the foundation stone was laid by Prime Minister Narendra Modi on 1 April 2015.

=== Criticism for not choosing Visakhapatnam as the capital ===
The government was criticized for not choosing the already established and largest city of Andhra Pradesh, Visakhapatnam which had all the infrastructure and the government lands needed to house the capital. Instead the government opted for land pooling 33000 acres of agricultural land. The then government had not given its opinion for choosing a new greenfield mega city which needed huge financial backing continuously which was also criticized.

== Change of Power in the government in 2019 ==
YSR Congress Party

For various reasons, Telugu Desam Party headed by Chandrababu Naidu lost in the 2019 Andhra Pradesh Legislative Assembly elections. The YSR Congress Party won the elections and Y. S. Jaganmohan Reddy became the Chief Minister of Andhra Pradesh in 2019. The Telugu Desam Party lost in all the assembly constituencies of the capital region in 2019 Andhra Pradesh legislative Assembly Elections to much surprise.

== Committees for the new capital(s) ==
The Government headed by the Chief Minister Y. S. Jaganmohan Reddy felt that the previous state government led by Chandrababu Naidu didn't take Siva Rama Krishnan committee into consideration about choosing the capital and also came to an opinion that constructing a mega greenfield city would eventually increase the burden on the government and also wouldn't cater to the rest of the state's aspirations which might take years of time to get a shape with huge financial backing from the government continuously. This would also interfere with the government's other financial schemes and development related works. So the government led by the Chief Minister Y. S. Jaganmohan Reddy appointed two new experts committees; G. N. Rao Committee, headed by a renowned retired IAS Officer G.N.Rao and Boston Consulting Group Committee to give a report on a new capital location and development of the state on 19 September 2019.

=== G. N. Rao Committee and Boston Consulting Group (BCG) Committee ===
Both the experts committees unanimously suggested for a decentralised development by transferring the powers of governance to the various parts of the state by choosing Visakhapatnam as executive, Amaravati as Legislative and Kurnool as Judicial Capitals and to fully use the resources and include the regions with faster pace development by establishing regional development boards. G. N. Rao committee submitted its report on 20 December 2019. Boston Consulting Group submitted its report on 3 January 2020.

=== High Power Committee ===
A high power committee was appointed by the government which included the ministers of the government to study the two committees; B.N. Rao committee and Boston Consulting Group Committee and to submit a final report discussing both committees. The same was submitted on 17 January 2020.

=== Bill prepared ===
After following through the report of the high power committee and two appointed committees; BN Rao Committee and Boston Consulting Group Committee, the cabinet of the Government of Andhra Pradesh had gone ahead with the reports of the committees and prepared a bill to make Visakhapatnam as the executive capital, Amaravati as the legislative capital and Kurnool as the Judicial Capital for the state of Andhra Pradesh which was approved by the cabinet on 20 January 2020. The bill was then introduced and passed on the same day in the Andhra Pradesh Legislative Assembly.

== The Bill ==
The Bill is envisaged to make Visakhapatnam the executive capital, Amaravati as the legislative capital, and Kurnool as the judicial Capital of Andhra Pradesh.

- Raj Bhawan, Secretariat, Chief Minister's camp office and offices of all the Heads of the Departments of Andhra Pradesh will be located at Visakhapatnam
- Seat of Legislature will be located at Amaravati
- Principal Seat of High court of Andhra Pradesh, Chief Justice and Judges' residences and all other state level Judicial institutions will be located at Kurnool.
- An additional Bench of High Court will also be located at Visakhapatnam to cater to the needs of the regions around the city.

== Legislative timeline of the Bill ==
The Yuvajana Sramika Rythu Congress Party government introduced the bill on cabinet to decentralise the governance in the state of 13 districts. Later, the bill was introduced in the Andhra Pradesh Legislative Assembly. The bill was passed on the Andhra Pradesh Legislative Assembly by having majority of the seats after 17 MLA's of the Telugu Desam Party were suspended due to the continuous obstruction. Although the bill was passed by the Andhra Pradesh Legislative Assembly, the lower house of Andhra Pradesh Legislature, it was stalled in the Andhra Pradesh Legislative Council by the Telugu Desam Party which had majority in the legislative council. However, after careful and proper verification, the Governor of Andhra Pradesh gave his assent to the bill on 31 July 2020, and the bill became an act.

== Concerns ==
=== Reactions ===
After the bill got passed on 20 January 2020, in the state legislative assembly, there was a celebration in the ruling party camp, while the decision caused consternation among others including the farmers of Amaravati who had given about 34,000 acres of their land for the capital. The ruling YSR Congress Party claimed that the move was aimed at decentralisation, but critics pointed out that the Jagan Mohan Reddy government made no difference between the distribution of capital functions and the decentralisation of development initiatives. The decision was also widely seen as essentially 'making capital out of political rivalry'.

=== Protests ===
The idea of three capitals by the Chief minister Y. S. Jaganmohan Reddy caused widespread demonstrations by the farmers of Krishna and Guntur districts. The passage of the bill triggered different types of protests and criticisms against the government. In the capital region of the state, farmers are against the theory of three capitals They stated that, the bill is against agreements to the farmers who gave 33,000 acres of agricultural lands to the government. After the bill was passed on 21 January 2020 by the Andhra Pradesh Legislative Assembly, violent protests erupted in Amaravati.
