= Andhra Pradesh Secretariat =

Government building in Velagapudi, India

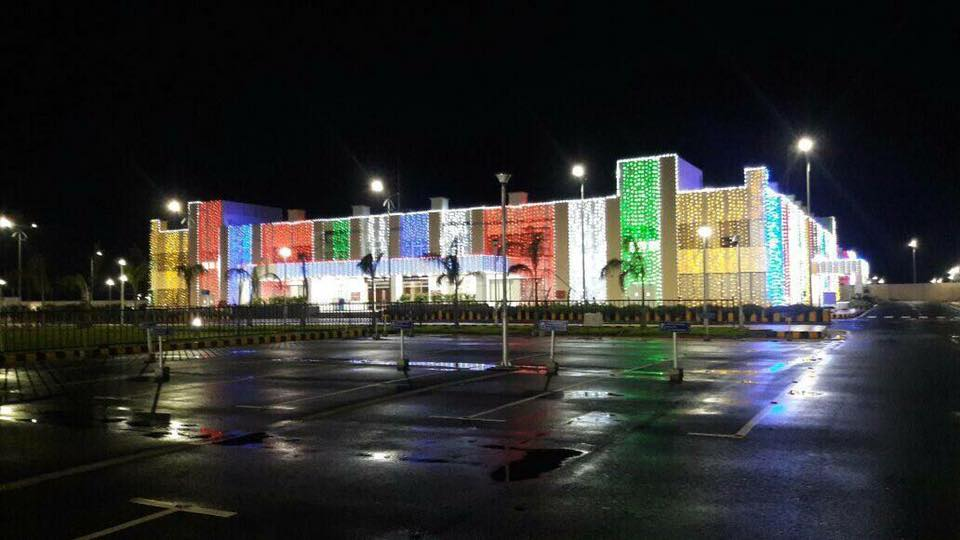
- Andhra Pradesh Secretariat at Velagapudi during Independence day 2017

- Location within Andhra Pradesh Location within India
- Alternative names: Andhra Pradesh Sachivalayam

General information
- Location: Velagapudi, India
- Coordinates: 16.526526°N 80.510951°E
- Construction started: 12 February 2016
- Inaugurated: 29 June 2016
- Relocated: 31 July 2020
- Owner: Government of Andhra Pradesh

The Andhra Pradesh Secretariat is the administrative headquarters of the Government of Andhra Pradesh, housing offices critical to state governance. Following the 2014 bifurcation of Andhra Pradesh into Telangana and Andhra Pradesh, the state established the Interim Government Complex (IGC) at Velagapudi, operational since October 2016, and the planned Amaravati Government Complex (AGC), designed by Foster and Partners under architect Norman Foster. The IGC serves as an interim administrative center, while the AGC, part of the Greenfield capital city of Amaravati, is intended as a sustainable complex.

== Departments ==
The Government of Andhra Pradesh operates through a structured administrative framework comprising various Secretariat departments. Each department is overseen by a Secretary to the Government, who serves as the administrative head, while overall coordination and supervision lie with the Chief Secretary. These departments are further divided into sub-divisions, directorates, and affiliated bodies such as boards and corporations to effectively implement government policies and deliver public services. As per the official allocation of business, the state currently has 37 departments.

- Agriculture & Co-operation
- Animal Husbandry, Dairy Development & Fisheries
- Backward Classes Welfare
- Chief Minister's Office
- Consumer Affairs, Food and Civil Supplies
- Economically Weaker Sections Welfare
- Energy
- Environment and Forests
- Finance
- General Administration
- Health, Medical & Family Welfare
- Home
- Housing
- Human Resources Development (Higher Education)
- Human Resources Development (School Education)
- Industries and Commerce
- Information Technology, Electronics and Communications
- Infrastructure and Investment
- Labour, Factories, Boilers and Insurance Medical Services
- Law
- Legislature
- Municipal Administration and Urban Development
- Minorities Welfare
- Panchayat Raj and Rural Development
- Planning
- Public Enterprises
- Real Time Governance
- Revenue
- Science, Technology and Innovation
- Skill Development and Training
- Social Welfare
- Swarna Gramam and Swarna Wardu
- Transport, Roads and Buildings
- Water Resources
- Tribal Welfare
- Women, Children, Differently Abled and Senior Citizens Welfare
- Youth Advancement, Tourism and Culture

== Interim Government Complex (IGC) ==
=== History ===
The Andhra Pradesh Reorganisation Act of 2014 designated Hyderabad as a shared capital for Andhra Pradesh and Telangana until June 2024, necessitating an independent administrative base for Andhra Pradesh. In March 2015, Chief Minister N. Chandrababu Naidu selected Velagapudi, a village in Guntur district near Vijayawada, as the site for an interim secretariat to enable governance outside Hyderabad. The decision aimed to establish a functional hub until the permanent capital at Amaravati was developed.

=== Construction and design ===
The complex occupies 45 acres of former agricultural land in Velagapudi. Shapoorji Pallonji Group was contracted to construct the complex, targeting completion by June 15, 2016, across ten phases with a budget of ₹220 crore (equivalent to ₹345 crore or US$36 million in 2026) in phase 1. Delays extended the operational start to October 3, 2016 with a final budget of ₹750.08 crore (equivalent to ₹12 billion or US$120 million in 2026). The complex comprises six two-story buildings (ground plus one). The first block houses the Chief Minister’s Office and a Command and Control Centre for real-time state monitoring, with remaining block occupying other departments. The sixth block was initially allocated for the Andhra Pradesh Legislative Assembly and Council, though its legislative use was deferred. The foundation, supported by pre-cast pile caps, is engineered to withstand 2,144 tonnes, verified through dynamic pile load tests. The design allocates 27 acres for administrative buildings and 18 acres for public amenities, including parking and utilities. Environmental clearance was granted by the State Environment Impact Assessment Authority (SEIAA) in April 2016, ensuring compliance with ecological standards.

=== Operations and challenges ===
The complex became fully operational on October 3, 2016, with most government departments relocating from Hyderabad. Chief Minister Naidu officially occupied his office on October 11, 2016, during Vijayadashami. A minimal staff remained in Hyderabad to handle ongoing legal matters. U. Muralikrishna, president of AP Secretariat Association says that, over 10,000 people were moved during this transition from Hyderabad to neighbourhoods around Velagapudi.

Construction faced logistical delays, and plans to add two additional floors were abandoned due to staff objections to working amid ongoing construction. In July 2017, rainwater leaks affected the fourth block, prompting a Crime Investigation Department probe after similar issues in the Opposition Leader’s chamber. These incidents raised concerns about construction quality, though the IGC remains the state’s primary administrative hub.

== Amaravati Government Complex (AGC) ==
=== History ===
Following the 2014 bifurcation, Government of Andhra Pradesh designated Amaravati, a 217-square-kilometer site along the Krishna River, as its permanent capital. Chief Minister Naidu envisioned Amaravati as a greenfield, sustainable city to rival global capitals. The project commenced with a foundation stone-laying ceremony by Prime Minister Narendra Modi on October 22, 2015. A land pooling scheme secured 33,000 acres from farmers, who received developed plots and lease payments in exchange. The AGC, encompassing the Secretariat, Legislative Assembly, and High Court, forms the core of this plan.

=== Structure and design ===
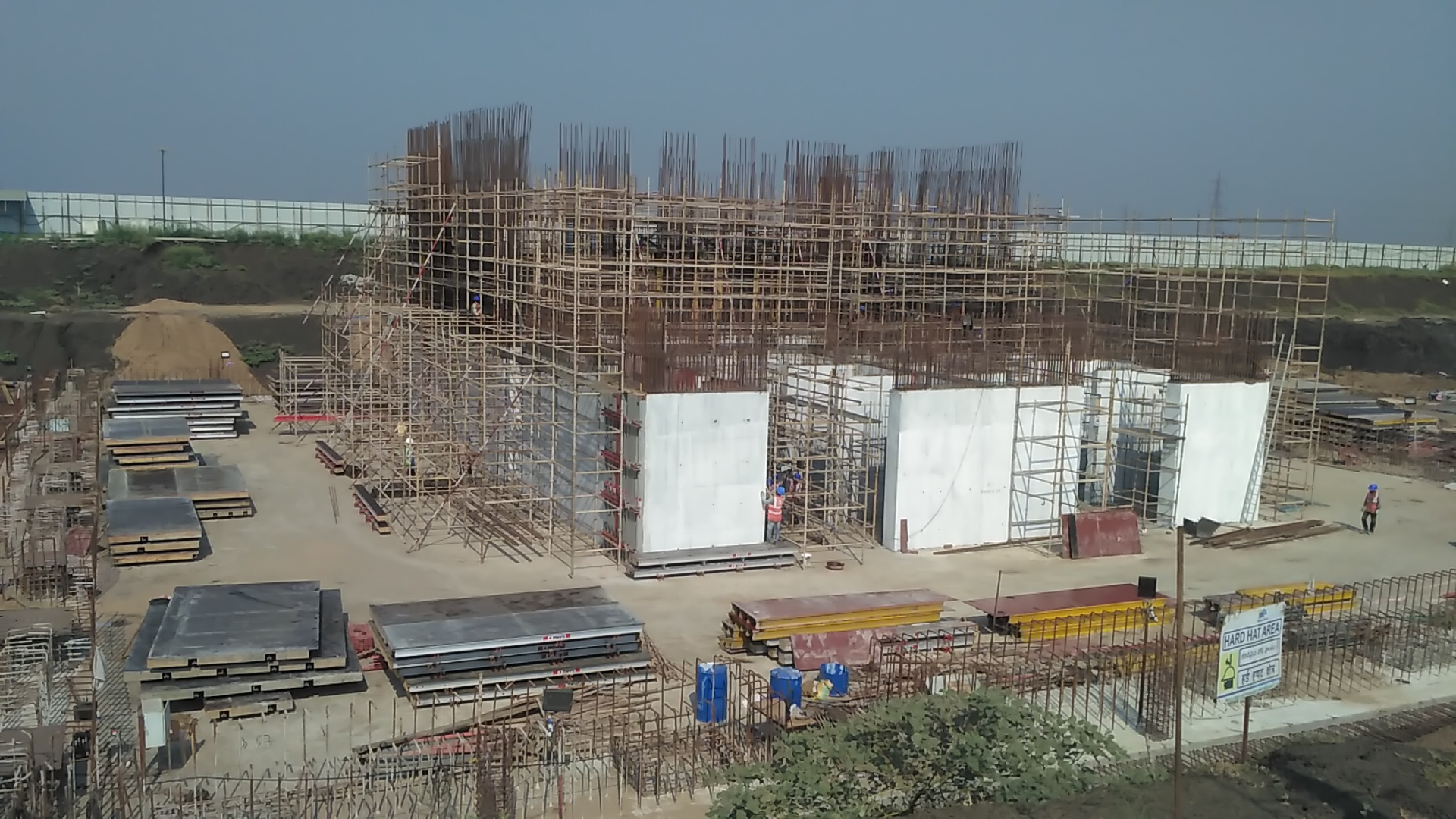
Raft foundation works of Tower 2 in 2019

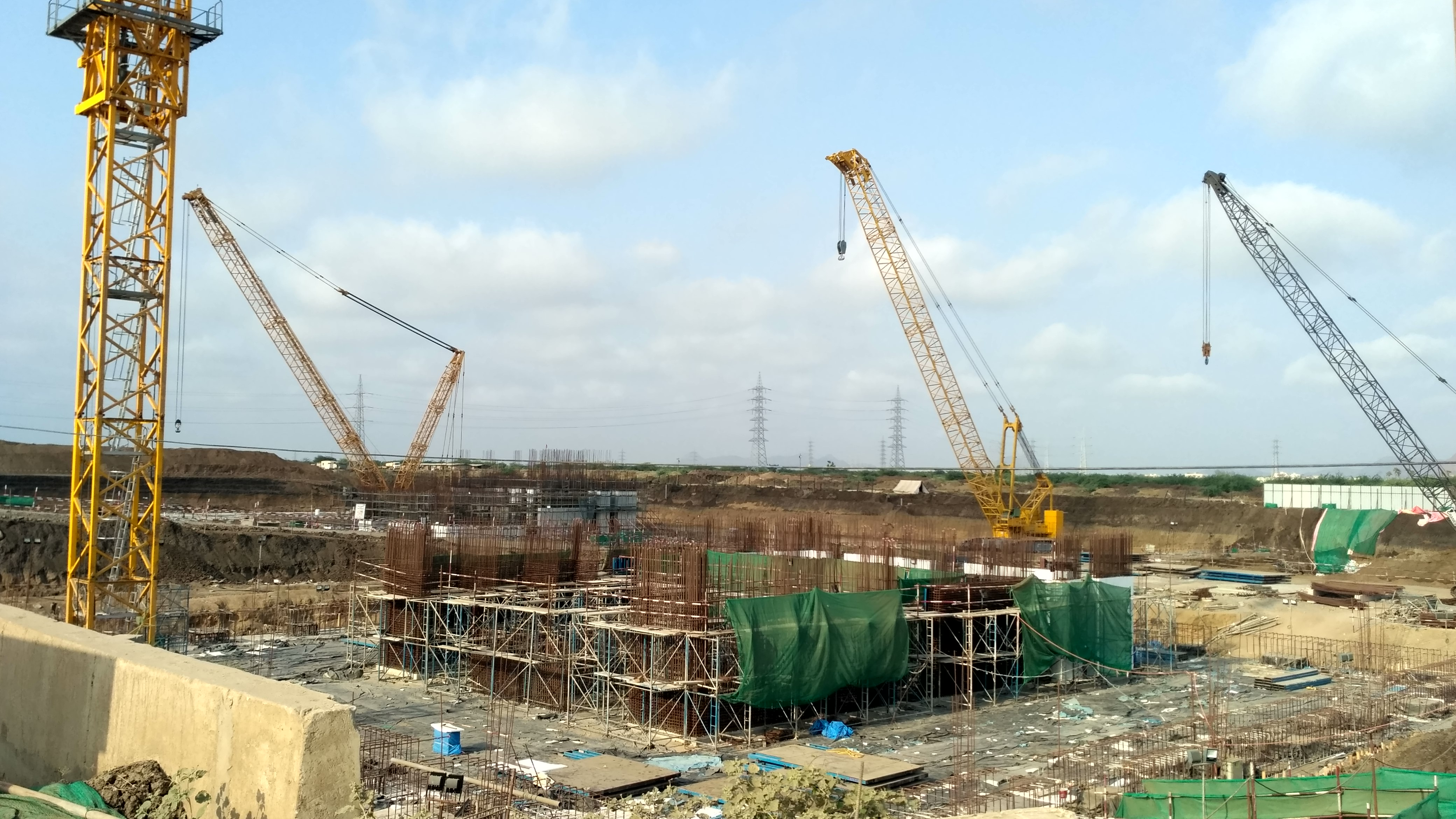
Tower 4 under construction in 2019

In 2017, Foster and Partners, led by Norman Foster, won an international competition to design the AGC. The complex spans 1,350 acres, measuring 5.5 km by 1 km, with a freshwater lake as its central feature. The design adheres to Vaastu Shastra principles, featuring a square layout, north and east entrances, and the assembly chamber in the southwest for auspiciousness. The Legislative Assembly building includes a spiraling ramp leading to a cultural museum and viewing gallery, designed as a public “void” to foster civic engagement. The Secretariat buildings, arranged symmetrically around the assembly, incorporate cultural elements, with one roof shaped like an ‘A’ symbolizing Amaravati. The design includes two major parks, a convention center, and statues of N. T. Rama Rao and B. R. Ambedkar, as proposed by Naidu. It draws inspiration from global capitals like Washington, D.C., and Brasília. The design prioritizes sustainability, incorporating solar panels, green roofs, and advanced waste management systems to achieve carbon neutrality. The Secretariat comprises five iconic towers, with the tallest reaching 50 floors and remaining HoD towers shall be of 42 floors high.

=== Construction progress ===
The project was targeted for completion by 2022, but political changes disrupted progress. After winning 2019 state elections, the YSR Congress Party (YSRCP) government, led by Y. S. Jagan Mohan Reddy, proposed Andhra Pradesh Decentralisation and Inclusive Development of All Regions Act, with a three-capital model of Visakhapatnam as the executive capital, Amaravati for legislative functions, and Kurnool for judicial, halting the development of AGC. Farmers who contributed land protested, citing unfulfilled compensation promises. Legal disputes over land acquisition were resolved in 2024 when the Supreme Court accepted the state’s commitment to a single capital at Amaravati.

After the 2024 state elections, Naidu’s return as Chief Minister revived the project. In June 2024, construction resumed with ₹15,000 crore (equivalent to ₹150 billion or US$1.6 billion in 2026) allocated for phase one, including ₹4,200 crore (equivalent to ₹43 billion or US$450 million in 2026) from the Central Government, $800 million from the World Bank, and ₹11,000 crore (equivalent to ₹110 billion or US$1.2 billion in 2026) from HUDCO. The Andhra Pradesh Capital Region Development Authority (CRDA) approved projects worth ₹24,276 crore (equivalent to ₹250 billion or US$2.6 billion in 2026), prioritizing the Secretariat and iconic towers. Prime Minister Modi is scheduled to relaunch the project in May 2025, with completion expected by 2027.

As of June 2025, the AGC remains under construction, with progress on the Secretariat and Legislative Assembly buildings. Foster + Partners continues to oversee design refinements to meet sustainability goals. The World Bank has recognized the project as a model for climate-resilient urban development.

== Comparison of complexes ==
The IGC at Velagapudi and the AGC at Amaravati serve distinct roles. The IGC, designed for immediate functionality, features a modest, utilitarian layout with six two-story blocks. In contrast, the AGC aims for global prominence, with a 1,350-acre sustainable design integrating cultural and ecological elements. The IGC’s construction cost ₹750.08 crore (equivalent to ₹775 crore or US$80 million in 2026), while the AGC’s budget exceeds ₹48,000 crore (equivalent to ₹500 billion or US$5.1 billion in 2026), reflecting its larger scale. The IGC operates as a temporary solution, while the AGC is intended to consolidate all major government functions, including the Secretariat, legislature, and judiciary. The IGC at Velagapudi continues to serve as the primary administrative hub until the AGC is operational.
