= Mandadam =

Neighbourhood in Amaravati, Andhra Pradesh, India

- Neighbourhood
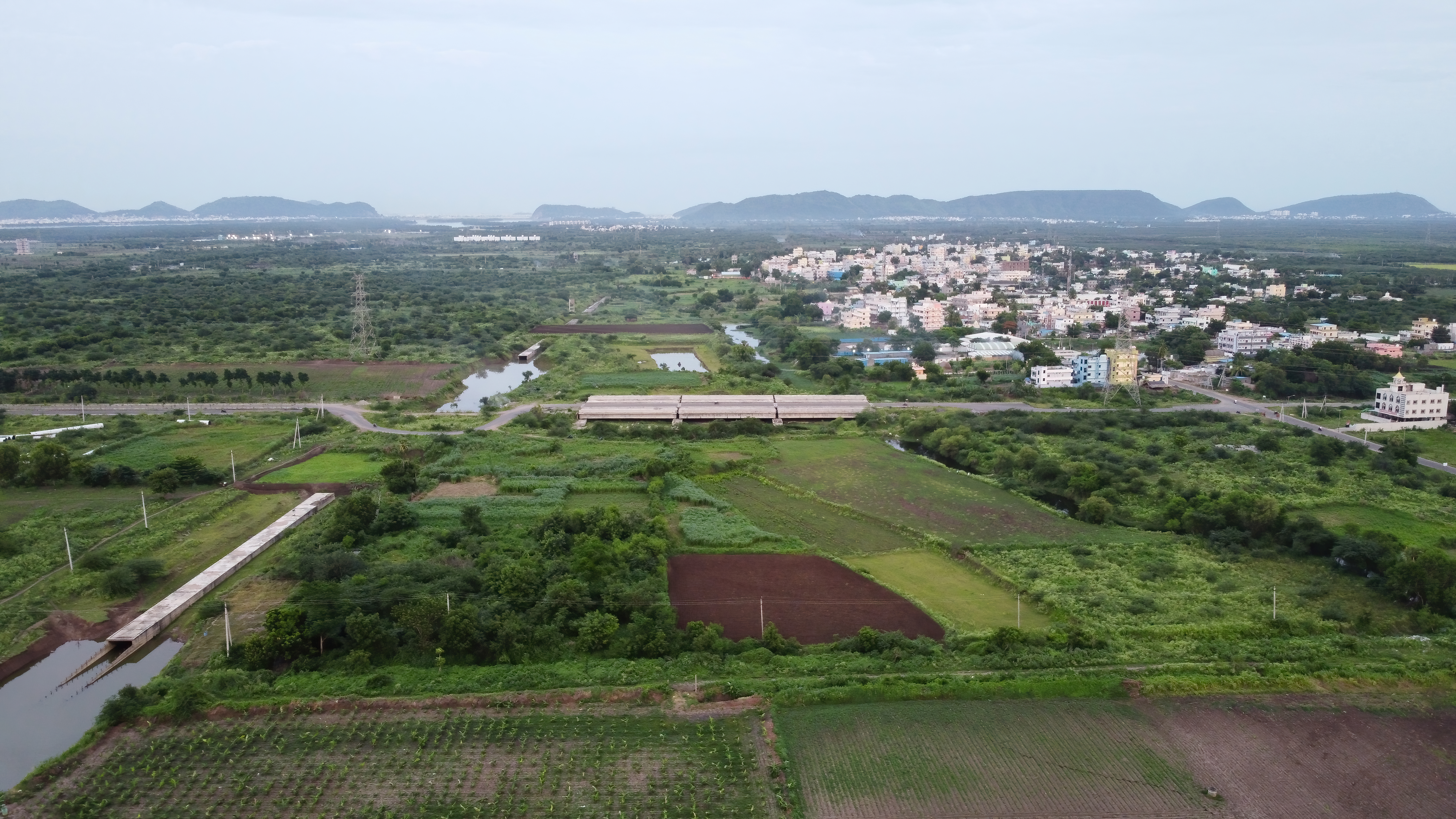
- Aerial view of Mandadam village and its surroundings

- Location in Andhra Pradesh, India
- Coordinates: 16°31′10″N 80°31′29″E
- Country: India
- State: Andhra Pradesh
- District: Guntur
- Janakiramapuram: 15.c

Area
  - Total: 20.18 km^{2} (7.79 sq mi)
- Elevation: 27 m (89 ft)

Population (2020)
  - Total: 8,000
  - Density: 400/km^{2} (1,000/sq mi)

Languages
  - Official: Telugu
- Time zone: UTC+5:30 (IST)
- PIN: 522 237
- Telephone code: +91–8645
- Vehicle registration: AP-13

Mandadam is a neighbourhood in Amaravati, Andhra Pradesh, India. It is a part of Urban Notified Area of Amaravati. It was a village in Thullur mandal of Guntur district, prior to its denotification as gram panchayat.

== History ==
King Ganapati Deva of Kakatiya Dynasty who ruled between 1199 AD to 1261AD had gifted the two villages of Mandadam and Velagapudi to Sivacharya, spiritual preceptor of Golaki Matham at Mandadam.

A 13th century stone inscription erected to commemorate the birth celebrations of Rani Rudrama Devi, a ruler of Kakatiya dynasty, lays in a state of neglect at Mandadam village. The inscription erected by Emperor Ganapati Deva, known popularly as Malkapuram inscription, is a rare archaeological find commemorating the achievements of Kakatiya dynasty. At Mandadam, Ganapati Deva crowned his daughter Rudrama Devi as his successor and latter ruled for another 30 years, scripting a golden chapter in the 13th century. Erected on a huge granite pillar measuring 14.6 X 2.9 X2.9 feet, the inscription has 182 lines engraved in Sanskrit and Telugu indicating the birth of Rudrama Devi, her coronation, extent of land donated to Visweswara temple and lists out the charitable works taken up in the village. It also refers to an educational building, presumably a college for teaching Sanskrit and Shaivite texts.

== Demographics ==
As of 2020 Census of India, the town had a population of 8,000, of which males are 3,900, females are 4,100 and the population under 6 years of age are 652. The average literacy rate stands at 68.95 percent, with 4,093 literates.

== Transport ==
Mandadam is located on Vijayawada and Amaravati route. APSRTC run buses offers transport services in the route., its very close to Vijayawada via Karakatta around 12kms. The center of Mandadam is always crowded with secretariat employees and Construction workers
