= Thullur =

Neighbourhood in Amaravati, Andhra Pradesh, India

Thulluru
- Neighbourhood
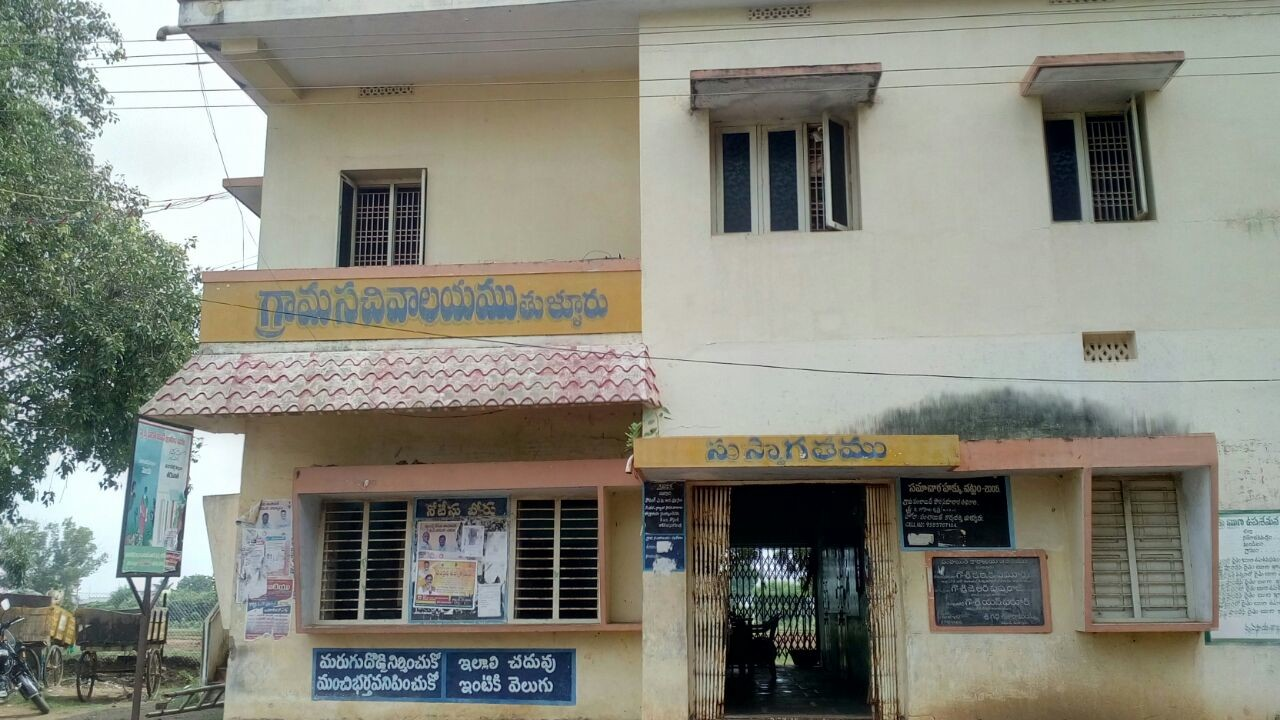

- Location in Andhra Pradesh, India
- Coordinates: 16.5275°N 80.4681°E
- Country: India
- State: Andhra Pradesh
- Region: Coastal Andhra
- District: Guntur

Area
  - Total: 14.92 km^{2} (5.76 sq mi)
- Elevation: 27 m (89 ft)

Population (2011)
  - Total: 7,794
  - Density: 522.4/km^{2} (1,353/sq mi)

Languages
  - Official: Telugu
- Time zone: UTC+5:30 (IST)
- PIN: 522 237
- Telephone code: +91–8645
- Vehicle registration: AP-07

Thulluru is a neighbourhood in Amaravati, Andhra Pradesh, India. It is a part of Urban Notified Area of Amaravati. It is located at a distance of 4 km from Krishna River and was a village in Thulluru mandal of Guntur district, prior to its denotification as gram panchayat.

== Demographics ==
As of 2011 Census of India, the town had a population of 7,794, of which males are 3,865, females are 3,929 and the population under 6 years of age are 700. The average literacy rate stands at 69.44 percent, with 4,925 literates.

== Transport ==
Thulluru is located on Vijayawada and Amaravati route. The village is served by the APSRTC city bus services from Vijayawada bus station and Guntur Bus Station. Nowadays No of Buses Plying over Thullur to serve Secratariat.

== Education ==
The primary and secondary school education is imparted by government, aided and private schools, under the School Education Department of the state. The medium of instruction followed by different schools are English, Telugu.

== See also ==
- Thulluru mandal
